= List of oil and gas fields of the North Sea =

Map of oil and gas fields

This list of oil and gas fields of the North Sea contains links to oil and natural gas reservoirs beneath the North Sea. In terms of the oil industry, "North Sea oil" often refers to a larger geographical set, including areas such as the Norwegian Sea and the UK "Atlantic Margin" (west of Shetland) which are not, strictly speaking, part of the North Sea. The UK list includes facilities in the Irish Sea.

== List of fields ==
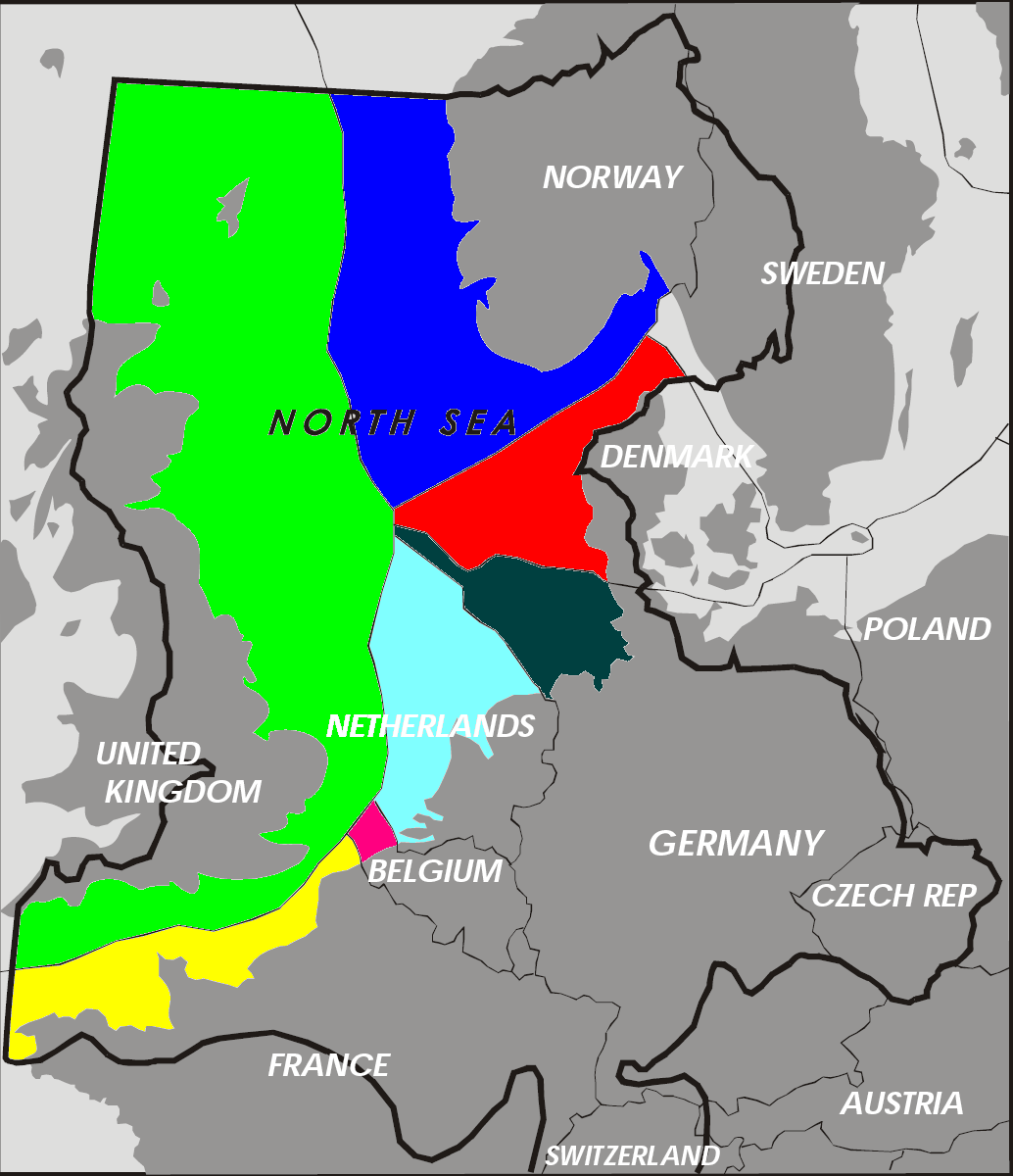
Map of exclusive economic zones

South to north.

=== Netherlands ===
==== Onshore ====
- Annerveen gas field - After Groningen, Annerveen is the largest gas field in the Netherlands. The field straddles the boundary between the Groningen and Drenthe.
- Groningen gas field - huge gas discovery
- Rijswijk oil field - oilfield with a Lower Cretaceous reservoir
- Schoonebeek oil field - largest onshore oilfield in Western Europe

==== Offshore ====
- Serviced from Den Helder
- Zuidwal
- Ameland - gasfield that started production in the mid-1980s
- De Ruyter oil field - most recent offshore oil development (2006)
- Hanze oil field - most northern oil field in the Dutch sector (2001)
- Many fields in Quadrants P, Q, K (e.g. K12-B), L, and some in blocks E, F)
- Helder, Helm and Hoorn oil fields
- K7-K12 gas fields
- K13 gas fields
- K14-K18 gas fields
- Kotter and Logger oil and gas fields
- L10 gas field
- L4-L7 gas fields
- L8-D gas field

=== United Kingdom ===
==== Onshore ====
See article Onshore oil and gas fields in the United Kingdom

==== Offshore ====
The UK continental shelf (UKCS) comprises six geographical and geological oil, gas and condensate regions: Southern North Sea (principally gas fields); Central North Sea (oil, condensate and gas fields); Moray Firth (oil and associated gas fields); Northern North Sea (oil and associated gas fields); West of Shetland (oil and associated gas); and the Irish Sea/Liverpool Bay (oil and gas). The fields and installations in the following list are allocated to regions corresponding to the Oil and Gas Authority's listings.

Installation Identification

Oil and gas field names follow themes chosen by the companies who originally developed them. An offshore installation on the UK Continental Shelf may comprise a single integrated platform or two or more bridge-linked platforms. Installations are identified by a large black-on-yellow sign on the installation. This may give the name of the original or current owner or operator, the field name, and a set of numbers and letters, e.g. Shell/Esso Leman 49/26A. The numbers identify the Quadrant and Block where the installation is located, e.g. 49/26 is in Quadrant 49 Block 26. The first letter is a sequential letter (A, B, C, D, etc.) identifying each installation within a field. For installations in the Southern North Sea the second and subsequent letters may designate a platform's function, e.g. the Leman 49/26A complex comprises four bridge-linked platforms 49/26AP (Production), 49/26AD1 (Drilling 1), 49/26AD2 (Drilling 2), and 49/26AK (Compression). Common designations are:

Letter(s)	Platform function
A	Accommodation
BLP	Bridge Linked Platform
C	Compression
CPP	Central Processing/Production Platform
D	Drilling (see note)
FTP	Field Terminal Platform
H	Hotel accommodation
K	Compression
LQ	Living Quarters
NUI	Normally Unmanned Installation
M	Manifold, Main, Metering
P	Production, Processing
Q	Living Quarters
PUQ	Production Utilities Quarters
R	Riser, Reception
T	Terminal
U	Utilities
W	Wellhead
WPP	Wellhead Protection Platform
X	Miscellaneous, e.g. as Low pressure compression, Reception.

Note: Drilling refers to the original function of the platform to support well drilling operations. No Southern North Sea installation has permanent drilling facilities.

On some installations the letters simply provide a unique two letter identity, e.g.Tethys TN, Viscount VO.

===== Southern North Sea gas fields =====
The Southern North Sea (SNS) comprises gas (plus associated condensate) fields. Themed field names comprise groups of fields that are geographically, operationally or commercially linked. Names are based on:

- Geographical location (Leman, Sole Pit, etc.)
- Personal names (e.g. Audrey, Sean)
- ‘Lost’ east coast villages (Ravenspurn, Newsham, etc.)
- Arthurian legend (e.g. Camelot, Excalibur, Guinevere)
- Planets and moons (Jupiter, Ganymede, etc.)
- Gemstones (Amethyst, Topaz)
- Scientists and inventors (e.g. Murdoch, Davy)
- Rivers (Tyne, Waveney, etc.)
- Sailing vessels (e.g. Ketch, schooner)
- Aircraft (Vulcan, Valiant, Victor, etc.)

A full listing of UK Southern North Sea gas fields is given in the table below.

The SNS fields are serviced from Easington, Lowestoft, Hartlepool, Great Yarmouth, Skegness, Norwich airport and Humberside airport.

UK Southern North Sea gas fields
Field	Block	Reservoir	Field installations	Export to	Production started	Decommissioned	Original licensee(s)	Current or last operator	Notes
Abbeydale formerly Aberdonia	53/1		Southwark NUI	Southwark				IOG	Under appraisal
Alison	49/11a		KX subsea	Audrey XW	Oct 1995	Production ceased February 2010	Venture Production	Venture, ConocoPhillips, Spirit Energy	
Amethyst	47/14	Rotliegende	A1D, A2D, B1D, C1D	Centrica Storage Terminal	1990, 1992	Production ceased in 2020. Abandonment and decommissioning in progress	Britoil, BP, BG, Centrica, Murphy	Perenco	
Anglia	48/18b 48/19b 48/19e		YD, YM subsea	YM to YD, YD to LOGGS	Nov 1991	Yes	Ranger, CalEnergy, Consort, Energy	Ithaca Energy	
Ann	48/10a 49/6a	Rotliegend	A4 subsea, XM subsea	Audrey XW	Oct 1993	Production ceased September 2012	Phillips, Venture Production	Venture, ConocoPhillips, Spirit Energy	
Annabel	48/10a		AB1, AB2 subsea	Audrey WD	Apr 2005	Cessation of Production approved Aug 2016	Venture	Spirit Energy	
Apollo	47/4a		subsea	Minerva	2003		BG Group & others	Perenco	
Artemis	47/3		subsea	Minerva	2003		BG Group & others	Perenco	
Arthur	53/2		subsea	Thames 49/28A	2005	2014	ExxonMobil	Esso	
Atlas			Saturn ND	LOGGS	Sep 2005	Production ceased Aug 2018	Conoco	ConocoPhillips	Part of Saturn area
Audrey	49/11	Rotliegend	Audrey A (WD), Audrey B (XW), WM subsea	XW to WD, WD to LOGGS	Oct 1988	Cessation of Production approved September 2016	Phillips	ConocoPhillips, Spirit Energy	
Avalon	49/09b						Mobil		
Babbage	48/2a		Platform	West Sole	Aug 2010		Dana Petroleum, E.ON Ruhrgas, Centrica	E.ON	
Baird	49/23		subsea	Inde 49/23D			Amoco	Perenco	Proposed gas storage facility, not taken forward
Barque and Barque South	48/13 48/14		PB, PL	Clipper	Oct 1990		Shell/Esso	Shell	
Beaufort	49/23			Davy, Bessemer	1996		Amoco	Perenco	
Bell (see NW Bell)	49/23						BP and ConocoPhillips		
Bessemer	49/23		49/23E	Inde 49/23A	1995		Amoco	Perenco	
Blythe	48/22, 44/23	Rotliegend	NUI	Bacton via recommissioned Thames pipeline	Starting 2022		Burmah	IOG	
Boulton	44/21a		BM	Murdoch MD	Dec 1997	Production ceased Aug 2018	Conoco	ConocoPhillips	
Boulton H	44/21a		HM subsea	Watt QM	Dec 1997	Production ceased Aug 2018	Conoco	ConocoPhillips	
Boyle	49/30a			Davy 49/30A			BP		
Breagh	42/13	Carboniferouds	Breagh A	Redcar, Seal Sands	Oct 2013		RWE Dea	INEOS	
Brigantine	49/19		BR, BG	Corvette	Oct 2001		Shell/Esso	Shell	
Brown	49/30c			Davy 49/30A	1996		BP		
Bure O	49/28		subsea	Thames 49/28A	1986	2014	ARCO	Perenco	
Bure West	49/28		subsea	Thames 49/28A	1986	2014	ARCO	Perenco	
Caister	44/23a	Carboniferous sandstone, Bunter	CM	Murdoch MD	Oct 1993	Yes	TotalEnergies	ConocoPhillips	
Callisto	49/22		ZM subsea	Ganymede ZD	Oct 1995	Production ceased Aug 2018	Conoco	ConocoPhillips	Part of Jupiter area
Camelot (central south, north & northeast)	53/1a 53/2		CA	Leman 27A	Oct 1989	2011	Mobil	ERT, Perenco	
Caravel	49/20b		Caravel QA and QR Normally Unattended Installation (NUI)	Corvette			Shell/Esso	Shell	
Carrack	49/9 49/14b 49/15		QA, Carrack West	Clipper	2003		Shell	Shell	
Cavendish	43/19b		Cavendish RM platform	Murdoch MD	Jul 2007	Production ceased Aug 2018	RWE Dea AG, Dana Petroleum	Ineos	
Ceres	47/9b		subsea	Mercury field	2009		Venture		
Chiswick	49/4a		Chiswick NUI	Markham	2007		Centrica, Nuon	Spirit Energy	
Cleeton	42/29	Rotliegend	CC/CPQ/CW/ECA Riser tower	Dimlington	Apr 1987		BP	Perenco	Production ceased, now a hub for Easington Catchment Area
Clipper complex	48/19a		PC/PW/PM/PR/PT	Bacton	Oct 1990		Shell	Shell	
Clipper South	48/19a 48/20	Rotliegend	Temporarily manned platform, RL	LOGGS until Aug 2018, Clipper from Nov 2018	Aug 2012		RWE Dea UK	Ineos	
Corvette	49/24		NUI	Leman 26A complex	Jan 1999		Shell/Esso	Shell	
Cutter	49/9a		QC platform	Carrack			Shell	Shell	
Cygnus	44/11 44/12	Permian Leman, Carboniferous Ketch	A & B	Eagles pipeline to Bacton	Dec 2016		Centrica, GDF Suez, Bayerngas	Neptune Energy	
Davy	49/30		49/30A	Inde 49/23A	1995		Amoco	Perenco	
Davy East	53/5b		subsea	Davy 49/30A	2008		Perenco	Perenco	
Dawn	48/29	Rotliegend	subsea	Hewett 48/29C	1969	Production ceased in 2015	Phillips	ENI	
Deben	49/28		subsea	Thames AR	1998	Yes	ARCO	Tullow	
Deborah	48/30	Rotliegend	subsea	Hewett 48/29C	1969		Phillips	ENI	Proposed gas storage facility, not taken forward
Delilah	48/30	Rotliegend	subsea	Hewett 48/29AP	1969		Phillips	ENI	
Della	48/30	Rotliegend	subsea	Hewett 48/29AP	1969		Phillips	ENI	
Dotty		Triassic				Production ceased in 2015	Phillips	ENI	see Little Dotty
Durango	48/17	Rotliegend	subsea	Waveney	Nov 2008		Bridge	Perenco	
Easington Catchment Area	47/9b				Nov 1999		BG Group	BG Group	Mercury and Neptune fields
East Sean	49/25a						Shell		
Elgood	48/22	Rotliegend	Subsea		Starting 2020?		Enterprise	IOG	
Elland	49/21a	Rotliegend					Silverstone Energy	IOG	Under appraisal
Ensign	48/14a 48/15a 48/15b		Normally Unattended Installation (NUI)	Audrey	2012	Well plugging and abandonment completed August 2019, full decommissioning by 2022	Centrica	Centrica, Spirit Energy	
Eris	47/8c		subsea	Mercury field			Venture		
Esmond	43/13a	Lower Triassic	Platform	Bacton	1985	1995	Hamilton Brothers	BHP	
Europa	49/22		EZ	Ganymede ZD	Oct 1999	Yes	Conoco	ConocoPhillips	Part of Jupiter area
Excalibur	48/17		EA	Lancelot	1993		Mobil	Perenco	
Fizzy									
Forbes	43/13	Triassic	Platform	Bacton	1985	1995	Hamilton Brothers	BHP	
Galahad and Mordred	48/12		48/12BA	Lancelot	Nov 1995		Perenco, Chieftan, Premier Pict	Perenco	
Galleon	48/20		PG, PN	Clipper	Oct 1994		Shell/Esso	Shell	
Ganymede	49/17		ZD	LOGGS	Oct 1995	Yes	Conoco	ConocoPhillips	Part of Jupiter area
Garrow	43/21	Rotliegend	NUI	Kilmar	2006		ATP	ATP	TORS development
Gawain	49/29a		49/29A subsea	Thames 49/28A	Oct 1986	2014	ARCO	Perenco	
Goddard formerly Glein	48/11			Blythe				IOG	Under appraisal
Gordon	43/20	Triassic	Platform	Bacton	1985	1995	Hamilton Brothers	BHP	
Grove	49/10		NUI	Markham	2007		Newfield	Centrica	
Guinevere	48/17b		49/17B	Lancelot	Jun 1993	Yes	Mobil	Perenco	
Harvey	48/23c, 48/24a,b	Leman sandstone					Arco	IOG	Under appraisal
Hawksley	44/17a		EM subsea	Murdoch MD	Nov 2002		Conoco	ConocoPhillips	
Helvellyn	47/10b		subsea	Amethyst	2004		ATP Oil & Gas, First Oil Expro Ltd	ATP Oil & Gas	
Hewett	48/29 48/30 52/4 52/5	Triassic, Permian, Zechstein	48/29A-FTP, 48/29A-P, 49/29B, 48/29C, 52/5A	Bacton	July 1969		Arpet/Phillips	Eni UK/Perenco	
Horne & Wren	53/3c		NUI	Thames 49/28A	2005	2014	Tullow	Tullow	
Hoton	48/7b		NUI	West Sole pipeline	Dec 2001		BP	Perenco	
Hunter	44/23		HK subsea	Murdoch KM		Production ceased Aug 2018	Caledonia		
Hyde	48/6		NUI	West Sole	Aug 1993		BP, Statoil	Perenco	
Hyperion			Saturn ND	LOGGS	Sep 2005	Production ceased Aug 2018		ConocoPhillips	Part of Saturn area
Indefatigable	49/23 49/18	Rotliegend	49/23AT/AC/AQ, 49/23CD/CP, 49/23D, 49/18A, 49/18B	18A & 18B to 23A, 23D to 23C, 23C to 23A, 23A to Leman 27B	Oct 1971		Amoco-British Gas	Perenco	
Indefatigable	49/24 49/19	Rotliegend	JD/JP, K, L, M, N	Perenco Inde 23A	Oct 1971	Production ceased 2005, removed 2010	Shell/Esso	Shell	
Johnston	43/27a		subsea	Ravenspurn North	Oct 1994		Hamilton	E.ON Ruhrgas, Dana	
Juliet	47/14b		subsea	Pickerill	Jan 2014	Production ceased Aug 2018	GDF Suez	Neptune Energy	
Juno				Minerva NUI	2003		BG Group	BG Group	Apollo, Minerva, Artemis, Whittle
Jupiter area						Production ceased Nov 2016	Conoco	ConocoPhillips	Ganymede, Sinope, Callisto, Europa, N.W.Bell
Katy	44/19b		NUI	Kelvin pipeline	2013		ConocoPhillips, GDF, Tullow	ConocoPhillips	
Kelvin	44/18b		TM	Murdoch MD	Nov 2007	Production ceased Aug 2018	ConocoPhillips, GDF, Tullow	ConocoPhillips	
Ketch	44/28		KA	Murdoch MD	Oct 1999	Production ceased Aug 2018	Shell	Shell	
Kew	49/5-4		subsea	Chiswick			Centrica		
Kilmar	43/22	Carboniferous	NUI	Trent	2006		ATP	ATP	TORS development
Lancelot	48/17a		48/17A	Bacton	1993		Mobil	Perenco	
Leman	49/27	Rotliegend	27AD/AP/AC/AQ/AX, BD/BP/BT, CD/CP, DD/DP, ED/EP, FD/FP, G, H, J	27D, F, G to 27B; 27C, E, H, J to 27B; 27B to 27A; 27A to Bacton	Aug 1968		Amoco-British Gas	Perenco	
Leman	49/26	Rotliegend	AD1/AD2/AP/AK, BT/BH, BD/BP, CD/CP, D, E, F, G	via AP to Bacton	Aug 1968		Shell/Esso	Shell	
Little Dotty	48/30	Rotliegend	subsea	48/29AP	1969		Phillips	ENI	
LOGGS (Lincolnshire Offshore Gas Gathering System)	49/16		PA/PC/PD/PP/PR	Theddlethorpe	1988	Production ceased Aug 2018	Conoco	ConocoPhillips	
Malory	48/12d		48/12D	Lancelot	1993		Mobil	Perenco	
Markham	49/05a 49/10b (also blocks J3b and J6 Netherlands)		ST-1 (UK), J6A (Netherlands)	Den Helder, Netherlands	1992	Cessation of production justification submitted April 2016	Lasmo	Centrica, Spirit Energy	Straddles the UK/Netherlands median line
McAdam	44/17		MM subsea	Murdoch MD	2003	Production ceased Aug 2018	ConocoPhillips, Tullow	ConocoPhillips	
Mercury	47/9b		subsea	Neptune	Nov 1999		BG Group	Perenco	
Mimas	48/9a		MN	Saturn ND	Jun 2007	Production ceased Aug 2018	ConocoPhillips	ConocoPhillips	Part of Saturm area
Minerva	47/3		NUI	Cleeton	2003		BG Group & others	Perenco	
Minke	44/24a	Carboniferous	subsea	Netherlands D15-FA platform	Jun 2007	Production ceased 2010	Neptune Energy	Neptune Energy	
Mongour	42/28c 42/28d	Rotliegend					Premier Oil		Not developed
Mordred	48/12b						Superior		
Munro	44/17b		MH	Hawksley EM	2005		Tullow, GDF, ConocoPhillips	GDF Suez	
Murdoch complex	44/22	Carboniferous sandstone	MA/MC/MD	Theddlethorpe	Oct 1993	Production ceased Aug 2018	Conoco, Tullow, GDF	ConocoPhillips	
Murdoch satellite	44/22		KM subsea	Murdoch MD		Production ceased Aug 2018	Conoco	ConocoPhillips	
Nailsworth	48/25a,b	Rotliegend					Shell/Exxon	IOG	Under appraisal
Neptune	47/4b		NUI	Cleeton	Nov 1999		BG Group	Perenco	
Newsham	48/7		NUI	West Sole pipeline	Mar 1996		BP	Perenco	
North Davy	49/30a						BP		see Davy
North Sean	49/25						Shell		see Sean
North Valiant	49/16		PD, SP	LOGGS	Oct 1988	Production ceased Aug 2018	Conoco	ConocoPhillips	
N.W. Bell	49/23		Subsea	Bessemer	Aug 1999	Yes		Perenco	
Orca	44/24a, 44/29b, 44/30a (D15b, D18a Netherlands)	Carboniferous	D18a-A platform	D15a-A platform	Dec 2013		Gaz de France	Neptune Energy	
Orwell	49/26a		49/28A-2 subsea	Thames 49/28A	1993	2014	ARCO	Tullow	
Pickerill	48/11b		A & B	B to A A to Theddlethorpe	Aug 1992	Production ceased Aug 2018	ARCO, AGIP	Perenco, Marubeni	
Platypus	48/1a	Rotliegend		Cleeton	2023?		Dana Petroleum, CalEnergy, Parkmead, and Zennor		Being developed
Ravenspurn North	43/26	Rotliegend	Ravenspurn N CPP, ST2, ST3	Cleeton	Oct 1989		Hamilton Brothers then BP	Perenco	
Ravenspurn South	43/26		A, B, C	Cleeton	Oct 1989		BP	Perenco	
Rebellion	48/22	Rotligend						IOG	Under appraisal
Rhea			Saturn ND	LOGGS	Sep 2005	Production ceased Aug 2018	Conoco	ConocoPhillips	Part of Saturn area
Rita	44/22c		subsea RH	Hunter	Mar 2009	Production ceased Aug 2018	E.ON Ruhrgas, GDF Suez	E.ON Ruhrgas	
Rose	47/10		subsea	Amethyst	2004	2015	Centrica	Centrica	
Rough	48/8		47/8A (AD/AP)& 47/3B (BD/BP) & CD	Centrica Storage terminal	Oct 1975	Gas storage facility ceased 2017	Amoco-British Gas	Centrica	Formerly used for natural gas storage
Saturn area	48/10c 48/10b		ND	LOGGS		Production ceased Aug 2018	Venture, Conoco	ConocoPhillips	Saturn, Mimas, Hyperion, Atlas, Rhea, Tethys
Schooner	44/26		SA	Murdoch MD	Oct 1996	Production ceased Aug 2018	Shell	Faroe	
Sean	49/24 49/25 49/30		RD, PD/PP	RD to PP PP to Bacton	Oct 1986		Shell/Esso, Union	Oranje Nassau Energie	
Seven Seas	48/7c		subsea	West Sole Alpha	2012		Centrica		
Shamrock	49/20a		NUI	Caravel	May 2008		Shell/Esso	Shell	
Sillimanite	44/19a (Netherlands D12-A D12-B)	Carboniferous	D12-B	D15-FA	2020		Wintershall Noordzee	Wintershall Noordzee	
Sinope	49/22				Oct 1999	Yes	Conoco	ConocoPhillips	Part of Jupiter area
Skiff	48/20a		PS NUI	Clipper			Shell	Shell	
Southwark	49/21c	Rotliegend	NUI	Bacton via recommissioned Thames pipeline	Starting 2022		Conoco	IOG	
South Sean	49/25						Shell		see Sean
South Valiant	49/21		TD	LOGGS	Oct 1988	Production ceased Aug 2018	Conoco	ConocoPhillips	
Stamford	48/10c		subsea	Markham	Dec 2008	Yes	Venture		
Tethys	49/11b		TN	LOGGS	Feb 2007	Production ceased Aug 2018	Conoco	ConocoPhillips	Part of Saturn area
Tetley	48/22	Hauptdolomit						IOG	Under appraisal
Thames	49/28		49/28AW/AP/AR	Bacton	Oct 1986	2014	ARCO	Perenco	
Thoresby	48/16c 48/17d						Hansa	Hansa	Under development
Thurne	49/28		subsea	Thames 49/28A	Oct 1986	2014	Tullow	Tullow, Perenco	
Tolmount	42/28d	Leman sandstone	Fixed steel platform	Easington	Late 2021		Harbour Energy, Dana Petroleum	Harbour Energy	
Topaz	49/1a 49/2a	Carboniferous	subsea	Schooner SA	Nov 2009	Production ceased Aug 2018	Faroe Petroleum, INEOS, Ithaca	RWE Dea	
Trent	43/24		Trent 43/24	Bacton	Nov 1996		ARCO	Iona Developments, Perenco	
Tristan	49/29		subsea	Welland & Thames	Nov 1992	2014	Mobil		
Tristan NW	49/29						Granby		
Tyne	44/18		NUI	Trent	1996	Yes	ARCO	Iona Developments, Perenco	
Valkyrie	49/16		OD	LOGGS		Ceased production 2016, removed by 2020	ConocoPhillips	ConocoPhillips	Extended reach well from Vampire OD
Vampire	49/16		OD	LOGGS	Oct 1999	Ceased production 2016, removed by 2020	Conoco	ConocoPhillips	
Vanguard	49/16		QD	LOGGS	Oct 1988	Production ceased Aug 2018	Conoco	ConocoPhillips	
Victor	49/22		JD, JM subsea	JM to JD JD to Viking B	Sep 1984	Yes	Conoco	ConocoPhillips	
Victoria	49/17		SM	Viking B	2008	Production ceased Aug 2018	Silverstone		
Viking A	49/12	Rotlegend	AR/AC/AP	Theddlethorpe	July 1972	Viking 'A' field (Viking North) decommissioned 1991 'A' field platforms (except AR) removed 1993-4	Conoco/BNOC	ConocoPhillips	
Viking B	49/16 49/17		BA/BC/BP/BD	LOGGS	1973	Yes	Conoco/BNOC	ConocoPhillips	Viking South, original export via Viking AR, then via LOGGS
Viking satellites	49/16, 49/17	Rotliegend	CD, DD, ED, GD, HD, KD, LD	Viking B complex	1973	Viking CD, DD, ED, GD & HD ceased production 2011–15, removed 2017-18	Conoco/BNOC	ConocoPhillips	Viking KD & LD are non-operational
Viscount	49/16		VO	Vampire OD		Ceased production 2015, removed by 2020	Conoco	ConocoPhillips	
Vixen	49/17		VM subsea	Viking B	Oct 2000	Production ceased Aug 2018	Conoco, BP	ConocoPhillips	
Vulcan	49/21	Rotliegend	RD, UR platforms	UR to RD RD to LOGGS	Oct 1988	Ceased production 2015, removed 2018-19	Conoco	ConocoPhillips	
Watt	44/22b		QM subsea	Murdoch	2003	Production ceased Aug 2018	Conoco	ConocoPhillips	
Waveney	48/17	Rotliegend	48/17C	Lancelot	1998		ARCO	Perenco	
Welland	53/4a		53/4A NUI	Thames 49/28A	Sep 1990	2010	ARCO ExxonMobil	Perenco	
Welland N.W.	53/4a		subsea	Welland 53/4A		Yes	ARCO	Perenco	
Wenlock	49/12		49/12A	Inde 23A	2007		ATP	ATP	
Wensum	49/28			Thames 49/28A	1986	2014	ARCO	Perenco	
West Sole	48/6	Rotliegend	WA, WB, WC	Easington	Mar 1967		BP	Perenco	
Whittle	42/28b		subsea	Cleeton	2003		BG Group	Perenco	
Windermere	49/9b, 49/4a	Rotliegend-Leman Sandstone	Windemere platform	Markham ST1 platform	Apr 1997	Yes	Wintershall	Ineos	
Wingate	44/24b	Carboniferous	Wingate platform	D15-A platform (Netherlands)	Oct 2011		Wintershall	Wintershall	
Wissey	53/4		subsea	Horne & Wren	Aug 2008	2014	Tullow	Tullow	
Wollaston	42/28		subsea	Whittle	2003		BG Group	Perenco	
Wren	53/3c						Tullow		see Horne
Yare	49/28		Yare C subsea	Thames 49/28A	Oct 1986	Yes	ARCO	Perenco	
York	47/02a		NUI	Centrica Storage terminal	Mar 2013		Centrica	Centrica, Spirit Energy	

===== Central North Sea fields =====
The Central North Sea comprises oil, condensate and gas fields. They are serviced from Aberdeen and Hartlepool

UK Central North Sea oil, condensate and gas fields
Field	Quad/Block	Reservoir	Field installation(s)	Liquid export to	Gas export to	First oil/gas	Decommissioned	Operator	Notes
Affleck	30/19					2009	In production	Maersk	
Alder	15/29a					2009	In production	Ithaca Energy (UK) Ltd.	
Alma	30/24		Alma FPSO (Floating Production, Storage and Offloading) Enquest Producer	Tanker		Oct 2015	Production ceased in June 2020	EnQuest	Formerly Argyll field
Angus	31/26a							Amerada Hess	
Arbroath oil field	22/17	Palaeocene	Arbroath platform	Montrose A		Apr 1990	In production	Formerly Amoco, Talisman Energy, Repsol Sinopec	
Argyll & Duncan oil fields	30/24, 30/25	Rotliegend / Zechstein	Argyll platform			Jun 1975		Hamilton Brothers	Later named Ardmore then Alma (see Alma)
Arkwright	22/23a		subsea	Monarb				Amoco	
Armada gas fields	22/5a	Palaeocene and Jurassic Fulmar	Armada platform	Cruden Bay via Forties pipeline	Teesside via CATS (Central Area Transmission System)			BG Group	
Arundel	16/23					2017	In production	BP	
Athena	14/18b		Athena FPSO BW Athena	Tanker		May 2012		Ithaca	Demobilised Feb 2016
Auk oil field	30/16	Rotliegend / Zechstein	Auk A platform	Fulmar A		Dec 1975		Formerly Shell, Talisman Energy, Repsol Sinopec	
Aviat gas field	22/7a	Lower Pleistocene	subsea		Forties A	2016		APA Corporation	
Baccus	22/6a							APA Corporation	
Balloch	15/20b							Maersk	
Banff	22/27a, 29/2a		Banff FPSO Petrojarl Banff	Tanker		Sep 1996	Production ceased in 2020	Formerly Sun Oil, Canadian Natural Resources CNR	
Bardolino	22/13a							Shell	
Beauly	16/21c							Talisman	
Beinn	16/7a					1994	In production	Marathon	
Birch	16/21a							Lasmo	
Bittern	29/1b					2000	In production	Shell	
Blackbird	20/2a					2011	Production ceased in 2016	Nexen	
Bladon	16/21d							Arco	
Blair	16/21a							Sun Oil	
Blane oil field	30/3a	Paleocene, Forties Sandstone	Tie back to Ula platform (Norway)	Ula platform	Ula platform	2007	In production	Talisman Energy	
Blenheim	16/21b							Arco	
Braemar	16/3b							Marathon	
Brechin	22/23a		subsea	Monarb				Paladin	
Brenda	15/25b							Oilexco	
Brimmond	22/6a					1996	In production	BP	
Britannia gas field	15/29, 16/26	Lower Cretaceous	Britannia platform	Cruden Bay via Forties pipeline	St Fergus via SAGE (Scottish Area Gas Evacuation)	Aug 1998		Britannia operator (ConocoPhillips and Chevron)	
Brodgar	21/3a					2008	In production	ConocoPhillips	
Buchan oil field	21/1a	Devonian Sandstone	Buchan A semi-sub	Cruden Bay via Forties pipeline		May 1981		Formerly Transworld Petroleum, Talisman Energy, Repsol Sinopec	
Burghley	16/22							Talisman	
Burgman	28/9					2018	In production	Premier	
Buzzard oil field	19/10, 20/6	Upper Jurassic	Buzzard Wellhead, Production, Utilities, Sweetening platforms	Cruden Bay via Forties pipeline	St Fergus via UK Frigg line	Jan 2007		Formerly Pan-Canadian/Encana, Nexen	the largest discovery in the last 25 years
Caledonia	16/26					2003	In production	ChevronTexaco	
Carnoustie	22/17		subsea	Monarb				Amoco	
Catcher	28/9					2017	In production	Premier	
Cawdor	30/14							Maersk	
Cayley/Caley	22/17		subsea	Monarb		2017	In production	Talisman	
Chanter	15/17							Occidental	
Chestnut field	22/2a		Chestnut FPSO Sevan Hummingbird	Tanker		Sep 2008		Centrica	
Clapham	21/24							PetroCanada	
Clyde oil field	30/17b	Fulmar sandstone	Clyde platform			Mar 1987		Formerly Britoil, Talisman Energy, Repsol Sinopec	
Cook	21/20a							Enterprise	
Crathes	21/13a							EnQuest	
Culzean	22/25a		Platform		CATS pipeline	Jun 2019	In production	Maersk, acquired by TotalEnergies	Gas condensate field estimated reserves 250 M Boe
Curlew field	29/7		Curlew FPSO	Tanker		Nov 1997		Shell	
Cyrus oil field	16/28	Palaeocene	Originally SWOPS vessel Seillean, then subseatie back to Andrew	OPV Seillean, Andrew		Apr 1990		BP	SWOPS production ceased Mar 1992
Dauntless	21/11							Amerada Hess	
Donan field	15/20		Donan FPSO Global Producer 3	Tanker		Jan 2007		Maersk	
Drake	22/5b					1997	In production	British Gas	
Duart	14/20b							Talisman	
Duncan	30/24							Hamilton	
Durward	21/16							Amerada Hess	
Egret	22/24d		subsea	ETAP				Shell	
Elgin-Franklin gas field	22/30, 29/5	Fulmar sandstone and Middle Jurassic	Elgin PUQ and Wellhead platforms	Cruden Bay via Forties pipeline	Bacton via SEAL (Shearwater Elgin Area Line)	Mar 2001		TotalEnergies	
Enoch	16/13a					2007	In production	Paladin	
Erskine gas field	23/26	Middle Jurassic sandstone	Erskine platform	North Everest	North Everest	Nov 1997		Chevron	
ETAP gas field complex - includes Marnock, Machar, Monan, Mungo, Madoes and Mirren fields	22/20, 22/24, 22/25, 23/16, 23/26		ETAP platform	Cruden Bay via Forties pipeline	Teesside via CATS			BP	Eastern Trough Area Project
Ettrick oil field	20/2, 20/3	Upper Jurassic	FPSO	Tanker		2009	Production ceased in 2016	Dana Petroleum	
Everest gas field	22/9, 22/10, 22/14	Palaeocene, Forties Sandstone	Everest North Platform & Everest North Riser Platform	Cruden Bay via Forties pipeline	Teesside via CATS	May 1993	In production	Formerly Amoco, BG Group, Chrysaor	
Farragon	16/28		subsea	Andrew	Andrew			BP	
Fife	31/26a							Amerada Hess	
Fleming field	22	Palaeocene, Maureen Formation	subsea	Armada		Oct 1997		BG	
Flora	31/26a							Amerada Hess	
Flyndre	30/14					2017	In production	Maersk	
Forties oil field	21/10	Palaeocene, Forties Sandstone	Forties FA, FB, FC, FD & FE platforms	Cruden Bay		Sep 1975		Formerly BP, APA Corporation	
Fram	29/3a					2020	In production	Shell	
Franklin field	29/5		Franklin WH	Elgin platform		Sep 2001	In production	TotalEnergies	
Fulmar oil field	30/11	Fulmar sandstone	Fulmar A & Fulmar AD platforms	Teesside via NORPIPE	St Fergus	Feb 1982		Shell, Talisman Energy, Repsol Sinopec	
Gadwall	21/19					2005	In production	Venture	
Galia	30/24						Production ceased in June 2020	EnQuest	
Galley	15/23a					1998	In production	Texaco	
Gannet oil and gas field (A, B, C, D, E, F and G)	21 and 22	Eocene, Palaeocene and Jurassic	Gannet A platform	Fulmar A then Teesside via NORPIPE	St Fergus via Gannet and Fulmar	A Nov 1993 B C D 1992 E 1998 F 1997 G 1999	In production	Shell U.K. Limited	
Glamis	16/21a							Sun Oil	
Glenelg	29/4d					2006	In production	TotalEnergies	
Godwin	22/17		subsea	Monarb		2016	In production	Talisman	
Golden Eagle Oil field	20/1, 14/26	Sandstone	Golden Eagle PUK platform & Wellhead platform	Forties pipeline at Buzzard or Flotta via Claymore installation	Ettrick (SAGE)	Nov 2014		Nexen	the second largest oil discovery in the UK North Sea since Buzzard was discovered in 2001
Goldeneye gas field	14/29		Goldeneye installation		St Fergus	Oct 2004		Shell	Decommissioned 2011
Goosander	21/12					2006	In production	Venture	
Grouse	21/19					2008	In production	Venture	
Guillemott West Guillemott/Teal	29 21		Guillemott West FPSO Triton, Guillemott Teal FPSO Anasuria	Tanker		Apr 2000 Jan 1997		Dana Shell	
Halley	30/12b							Talisman	
Hamish	15/21b							Amerada Hess	
Hannay	20/5c							Talisman	
Harrier	30/6a							Ithaca	
Hawkins	22/5a							British Gas	
Heron Cluster oil fields includes Heron, Egret and Skua		Triassic Skagerrak Formation	subsea	ETAP				Shell U.K. Limited	
Highlander	14/20							Texaco	
Howe	22/12a							Shell	
Huntington	22/14b		FPSO		CATS pipeline		Production ceased in 2020	EON Ruhrgas	
Innes	30/24							Hamilton	
Iona	15/17							Elf Exploration	
Ivanhoe	15/21							Amerada Hess	
Jackdaw gas field	30/02a, 30/02d, 30/03a		WHP platform		Shearwater				
James	30/17a							Kerr McGee	
J-Block gas field Jade, Janice, Jasmine, Joanne, Judy	30/2	Triassic, Chalk and Palaeocene	Jade, Jasmine WHP & LQ, Judy, Janice (semi-sub), Joanne (subsea)	Jade to Judy, Jasmine to Judy, Joanne to Judy, Janice to Judy, Judy to Teesside via NORPIPE	Judy to Teesside via CATS, Janice to Teesside via CATS	Feb 2002, Feb 1999		ConocoPhillips	
Kingfisher	16/8a					1997	In production	Shell	
Kinnoull	16/23		subsea	Andrew	Andrew			BP	
Kittiwake oil field	21/18	Upper Jurassic	Kittiwake A platform	Originally by tanker, then Cruden Bay via Forties Unity		Sep 1990		Formerly Venture then Petrofac now EnQuest	
Kyle	29/2c						Production ceased in 2020	Ranger	
Larch	16/12a							Lasmo	
Leven oil field	30/17b		subsea	Clyde				Formerly Britoil	near Clyde field
Lochranza	15/20a							Maersk	
Lomond gas field	23/21	Palaeocene, Forties Sandstone	Lomond platform		Teesside via CATS	Jul 1993		Formerly Amoco, BG Group, Chrysaor	
MacCulloch	15/24b							Conoco	
Machar, Madoes, Marnock, Monan, Mungo, and Mirren fields	22/20, 22/24, 22/25, 23/16, 23/26								see ETAP
Mallard	21/19					1998	In production	Shell	
Maria	16/29a		subsea	Armada	Armada	2008	In production	BG	
Maule	21/10					2010	In production	APA Corporation	
Maureen oil field	16/29	Palaeocene	Maureen platform	Tanker			Production ceased in October 1999	Phillips Petroleum	abandoned, platform removed 2001
Medwin oil field	30/17b		subsea		Clyde			Formerly Britoil	near Clyde field
Merganser gas/condensate field	22		subsea	Shearwater		2006	Production ceased in December 2020	Shell U.K. Limited	
Monarb (Montrose, Arbroath)			Platforms	Forties pipeline system	CATS pipeline				
Nicol	15/25a							Oilexco	
Moira oil field	16/29	Palaeocene	subsea	Maureen					
Montrose oil field	22/17	Paleocene, Forties Sandstone	Montrose A platform, Montrose Bridge Linked Platform	Forties field		Jun 1976		Talisman Energy, Repsol Sinopec	
Mungo field	22		Mungo NUI platform			Jul 1998		BP	
Nelson oil and gas field	22/6, 22/7, 22/11, 22/12	Palaeocene, Forties Sandstone	Nelson platform	Forties field	St Fergus	Feb 1994		Shell Oil	
Nethan oil field	30/17b		subsea	Clyde		Sep 1992		Formerly Britoil, BP	near Clyde field
Orion	30/18					1999	In production	Talisman	
Peregrine	20/1					2015	In production	Nexen	
Petronella	14/20					1986	In production	Texaco	
Pict	21/23b							PetroCanada	
Pierce oil field	23/22, 23/27	Palaeocene	Pierce FPSO	FPSO		Feb 1999	In production	Shell U.K. Limited	
Renee	15/27							Phillips	
Rob Roy	15/21a							Amerada Hess	
Rochelle	15/27							Endeavour	
Rubie	15/28b							Phillips	
Saxon	21/23b					2007	In production	PetroCanada	
Scolty	21/8					2016	In production	EnQuest	
Scoter gas/condensate field	22/30		subsea	Shearwater			Production ceased in December 2020	Shell U.K. Limited	
Seymour	22/5b		subsea	Armada		2003	In production	British Gas	
Shaw	22/22a		subsea	Monarb		2017	In production	Talisman	
Shearwater gas/condensate field	22/30	Jurassic Fulmar sandstone	Shearwater A Wellhead platform, Shearwater C PUQ platform	Forties field	Bacton via SEAL	Sep 2000		Shell U.K. Limited	
Shelley	22/2b							Oilexco	
Skua	22/24b		subsea	ETAP				Shell	Part of Marnock
Starling	29/3a							Shell	
Stella field	30		Stella FPF-1 (semi-sub)			Feb 2017	In production	Ithaca	
Stirling	16/21a							Sun Oil	
Teal	21/25					1997	In production	Shell	
Telford	15/22					1996	In production	Amerada Hess	
Toni	16/17					1993	In production	AGIP	
Tonto	21/10b					2013	In production	APA Corporation	
Tweedsmuir	21/1a					2007	In production	Talisman	
Utguard	16/18					2019	In production	Statoil	
Wood	22/18		subsea	Monarb		2007	In production	Paladin	

===== Moray Firth fields =====
These fields are in Quadrants 11 to 16. Serviced from Aberdeen

UK North Sea (Moray Firth) oil, condensate and gas fields
Field	Quad/Block	Reservoir	Field installation(s)	Liquid export to	Gas export to	First oil/gas	Decommissioned	Operator	Notes
Alba oil field	16/26	Eocene	Alba Northern platform	Alba FSU (floating storage unit) then tanker	Britannia	Jan 1994		Chevron	
Atlantic field	14/26a, 20/1 (north) and 13/30.		subsea		SAGE pipeline	2006	Production ceased		
Beatrice oil field	11/30a	Upper Jurassic	Beatrice AD, AP, B and C platforms	Nigg Energy Park		Sep 1981	Production ceased in 2017	Mesa Petroleum, thenTalisman Energy, Ithaca	Non-operational
Blake oil field	13/24 13/29b	Lower Cretaceous	subsea	Ross FPSO (Floating Production Storage and Offloading) Bleo Holm	St Fergus via Frigg pipeline	2001		BG Group	
Brodgar & Callanish fields	15/29 21/4		subsea	Britannia BLP (Bridge Linked Platform)		Jun 2008		BOL	
Captain Oil field	13/22		WPP (Wellhead Protection Platform) 'A' bridge linked to the BLP	FPSO then tanker	St Fergus via Frigg pipeline	Mar 1997		Texaco, then Chevron	
Claymore oil field	14/19	Upper Jurassic	Claymore A (CPP) and Claymore Quarters platforms, bridge linked	Flotta via pipeline	Frigg pipeline (gas import)	Nov 1977		Originally Occidental of Scotland, then Elf, Talisman Energy, Repsol Sinopec	
Cromarty gas field	13/30		subsea		To Atlantic subsea manifold then St Fergus via SAGE pipeline	2006	Production ceased	BG Group	
Jacky oil field	12/21c		Wellhead platform	Nigg via pipeline		Apr 2009		Ithaca	Non-operational
Lybster oil field	11/24		Onshore well	Onshore	Onshore	May 2012		Caithness Oil, ten Trapoil	
Piper oil field	15/17	Upper Jurassic	Piper Alpha Piper Bravo	Flotta via pipeline		Dec 1976 1992		Occidental, Elf, Talisman Energy, Repsol Sinopec	Piper A destroyed July 1988
Ross oil field	13/28 13/29	Upper Jurassic	Ross FPSO Bleo Holm	Tanker		Apr 1999		Ultramar, then Talisman Energy, Repsol Sinopec	
Saltire oil field	15/17		Saltire A platform	Piper Bravo		May 1993		Occidental, then Elf, Talisman, Repsol Sinopec	
Scapa oil field	14/19	Lower Cretaceous	subsea template	Claymore	Claymore	1986		Occidental, then Elf, Talisman, Repsol Sinopec	
Scott oil field	15/21 15/22	Upper Jurassic	Scott JD and JU platforms (bridge linked	Cruden Bay via Forties	St Fergus via SAGE (Scottish Area Gas Evacuation)	Sep 1993		Amerada Hess, then Nexen	
Solitaire oil field	14/26a		subsea	Golden Eagle				Nexen	
Tartan oil field	15/16 14/20	Upper Jurassic	Tartan A platform	Claymore via pipeline	St Fergus via Frigg pipeline	Jan 1981		Texaco, then Talisman Energy, Repsol Sinopec	

===== West of Shetland oil fields =====
Located in Quadrants 204, 205 and 206, these fields are serviced from Aberdeen and Lerwick

UK North Sea (West of Shetland) oil and associated gas fields
Field	Quad/Block	Reservoir	Field installation(s)	Liquid export to	Gas export to	First oil/gas	Decommissioned	Operator	Notes
Clair oil field	206/8		Clair platform, bridge linked Clair Ridge DP and QU platforms	Sullom Voe via pipeline	West of Shetland gas pipeline	Feb 2005, 2018		BP	
Edradour condensate field	206/4							TotalEnergies	
Foinaven oil field	204/19, 204/24		Foinaven FPSO Petrojarl	Tanker	West of Shetland gas pipeline	Nov 1997	Production suspended in Apr 2021	operated by Teekay Petrojarl on behalf of BP Rish	
Laggan condensate field	206/1	Paleocene Vaila	Subsea wellheads	Sullom Voe		2016		TotalEnergies	
Lancaster oil field	205/21a, 205/22a, 205/26b	Fractured basement	Aoka Mizu FPSO	Tanker	Link to West of Shetland gas pipeline is being planned.	June 2019		Hurricane Energy	Early Production System (EPS) is producing oil. Full field development investment decision expected in 2022.
Schiehallion oil field and Loyal oil field	204/20 204/25		Schiehallion FPSO, Glen Lyon FPSO	Tanker	West of Shetland gas pipeline	Jul 1998, May 2017		BP	In production using Glen Lyon FPSO
Solan oil field	205/26		Solan Platform	Storage tank then tanker	None	Apr 2016		Premier Oil	
Tormore condensate field	205/5a	Paleocene Vaila	Subsea wellheads	Sullom Voe via Laggan		2016		TotalEnergies	

===== Northern North Sea oil fields =====
Serviced from Aberdeen and Sumburgh airport

UK Northern North Sea oil and associated gas fields
Field	Quad/Block	Reservoir	Field installation(s)	Liquid export to	Gas export to	First oil/gas	Decommissioned	Operator	Notes
Alwyn North oil and gas field	3/9a 3/4a	Middle Jurassic	Alwyn North NAA and NAB platforms bridge linked	Cormorant	St Fergus via Frigg pipeline	Nov 1987		TotalEnergies	
Andrew oil field	16/27,16/28	Palaeocene	Andrew platform	Cruden Bay via Forties pipeline	Teesside via CATS (Central Area Transmission System)	Jun 1996		BP	
Balmoral oil field	16/21	Palaeocene	Balmoral FPV (Floating Production Vessel)	Cruden Bay via Brae/Forties link		Nov 1986	2020	Formerly Sun Oil, Premier	
Barnacle	211/29							EDP	
Bentley Oil Field	9/3b							Whalsay	Under appraisal
Beryl oil field	9/13	Upper Jurassic	Beryl A, Beryl B and Beryl A riser tower platforms	Tanker	St Fergus via SAGE (Scottish Area Gas Evacuation)	Jun 1976		Formerly Mobil, APA Corporation	
Birch	16/12a		subsea Z3 and Z5	Brae A	Brae A			Spirit Energy	Part of Trees development
Boa	9/15a							Maersk	
Brae oil field	16/7a	Upper Jurassic (several satellite accumulations)	Brae A, Brae B & Brae East platforms	Cruden Bay via Forties pipeline	St Fergus via SAGE (Scottish Area Gas Evacuation)	Jun 1983, Apr 1988, Dec 1993		Marathon Oil	
Brent oil field	211	Middle Jurassic	Brent A, B, C, D, Brent Spar, Brent Flare	Sullom Voe	St Fergus via FLAGS (Far North Liquid and Associated Gas System)	Nov 1976		Shell	
Bressay oil field								Statoil	Awaiting development
Broom	2/5							DNO	
Bruce oil field	9/9a, 9/8a, 9/9b		Bruce D, Bruce PUQ, Bruce Phase II platforms, bridge linked	Cruden Bay via Forties system	St Fergus via Frigg pipeline	May 1993		Formerly Hamilton Brothers, Serica Energy plc formerly BP	
Buckland	9/18a							Mobil	
Callater	9/19b							APA Corporation	
Causeway	211/23b							Valiant	
Cladhan	210/29a							TAQA	
Columba oil field	3/7a, 3/7b, 3/8a		Extended-reach drilling from Ninian platforms	Ninian					
Conrie	211/18a							EnQuest	
Cormorant oil field	211/21a 211/26a	Middle Jurassic	Cormorant A & Cormorant North platforms	Sullom Voe		Dec 1979 Feb 1982		Formerly Shell, TAQA	
Crawford	9/28							Hamilton	
Devenick	9/24b							BP	
Deveron	211/18							Britoil	
Don oil field	211		Northern Producer FPSO	Tanker		Apr 2009		Formerly Signal Oil/Britoil, EnQuest	
Dunbar oil field	3/14a		Dunbar platform	Alwyn North		Dec 1994		TotalEnergies	
Dunlin oil field	211/23a 211/24a	Middle Jurassic	Dunlin A platform	Cormorant A	Import from Thistle platform	Aug 1978		Formerly Shell, Fairfield	Decommissioning
Eider oil field	211/16a 211/21a	Middle Jurassic	Eider platform	North Cormorant		Nov 1988		Formerly Shell, TAQA	
Ellon	3/15							TotalEnergies	
Emerald oil field	2/15a		FPV Emerald Producer			Aug 1992		Midland & Scottish Resources	Decommissioned 1996
Falcon	210/25a							TAQA	
Fionn	211/22a							Valiant	
Forvie North	3/15							TotalEnergies	
Glenlivet	214/30a							TotalEnergies	
Grant	3/14a							TotalEnergies	
Gryphon oil field	9/18	Eocene	Gryphon A Production Vessel	Tanker		Oct 1993		Kerr McGee, Maersk Oil	
Harding oil field	9/23	Eocene	Harding platform	Tanker	Reinjection	Apr 1996		TAQA (formerly BP)	
Heather oil field	2/5	Middle Jurassic	Heather A platform	Sullom Voe via Ninian		Oct 1978		Formerly Unocal, DNO and Lundin, now EnQuest	
Hudson oil field	210/24		subsea	Tern	Tern	1993		TAQA formerly Shell	
Hutton oil field, NW Hutton oil field	211/27 211/28 211/27a		Hutton TLPTension-leg platform, NW Hutton Platform	NW Hutton to Cormorant A	NW Hutton to Ninian	Jul 1984 1983		Conoco Amoco	TLP decommissioned 2001, NW Hutton ceased production 2002 removed 2009
Islay	3/15							TotalEnergies	
Jura	3/15							TotalEnergies	
Keith	9/8a							BHP	
Kestrel oil field	211/21a		subsea	Tern	Tern	2001		TAQA formerly Shell	
Kraken	9/2							EnQuest	
Larch	16/12a		subsea Z6 and Z7	Brae A	Brae A			Spirit Energy	Part of Trees development
Leadon oil field	9/14a and 9/14b		Global Producer III FPSO	Tanker	Import from Beryl A	2001	Decommissioned	Formerly Kerr McGee then Maersk	
Linnhe	9/13c							Mobil	
Loirston	9/13b							Exxon-Mobil	
Lyell oil field				Ninian Central	Ninian Central			Canadian Natural Resources Limited	
Maclure	9/19							BP	
Magnus oil field	211/7a 211/12a		Magnus platform	Ninian Central	Brent A via Northern Leg Gas Pipeline (NLGP)	Aug 1993		EnQuest (formerly BP)	
Mariner	9/11							Statoil	
Merlin	211/23a							Shell	
Miller oil field	16/7 16/8		Miller platform	Brae A	St Fergus via dedicated sour gas pipeline	Jun 1992		Originally Conoco, BP	Non-operational
Morrone	9/23b							TAQA	
Murchison oil field	211/19		Murchison platform	Dunlin A	Brent A via Northern Leg Gas Pipeline (NLGP)	Sep 1980	Yes	Originally Conoco, then Oryx, Kerr McGee, Canadian Natural Resources Limited	
Ness	9/13b							Mobil	
Nevis	9/13							Mobil	
Ninian oil field	3/3 3/8		Ninian Northern, Ninian Central and Ninian Southern platforms	North & South to Central, Central to Sullom Voe	St Fergus via Brent A	Dec 1978		Originally Burmah/ Chevron, Canadian Natural Resources Limited	
Orlando	3/3							Iona	
Osprey	211/23							Shell	
Otter	210/15a							TotalEnergies	
Pelican	211/26							Shell	
Penguin	211/13							Shell	
Playfair	211/19							CNR	
Rhum gas field	3/29			Bruce				Serica Energy	
Skene	9/19							Exxon-Mobil	
Staffa	3/8b							Lasmo	
Strathspey oil field			subsea	Ninian Central				Chevron	
Sycamore oil field	16/12a	Upper Jurassic	subsea	via Tiffany and Brae				Originally Britoil, Venture, Spirit Energy	subsea tie back to Tiffany and Brae, part of Trees development
Tern oil field	210/25a		Tern platform	North Cormorant		Jun 1989		TAQA, formerly by Royal Dutch Shell and licensed by Shell/Esso	
Thelma oil field	16/17	Upper Jurassic	subsea	Tiffany				Originally Phillips	Tiffany, Toni, Thelma and SE Thelma fields, subsea tie back to Tiffany
Thistle oil field	211/ 18		Thistle A platform	Sullom Voe via Brent System	Import from NLGP	Feb 1978		Formerly BNOC/Britoil/BP, then DNO then Lundin then EnQuest	
Tiffany oil field	16/17	Upper Jurassic	Tiffany platform	Cruden Bay via Brae-Forties pipeline	Brae field	Nov 1993		Originally AGIP UK, then Phillips, then Canadian Natural Resources Limited	
Tullich	9/23a							Kerr-McGee	
Western Isles	210/24a	Jurassic	Subsea	Sullom Voe via Tern Alpha		Nov 2017	2024	Dana Petroleum	Decommissioning
Ythan	211/18a							EnQuest	

===== Irish Sea gas/oil fields =====
These UK fields are located in two main areas of the eastern Irish Sea: Morecambe Bay and Liverpool Bay. Although not part of the North Sea they are on the UK Continental Shelf. The fields are serviced from Liverpool, Blackpool and Morecambe.

UK Irish Sea gas and oil fields
Field	Quad/Block	Reservoir	Field installation(s)	Liquid export to	Gas export to	First oil/gas	Operator	Notes
Bains gas field	110/3c		subsea		Morecambe South field	2003	Spirit Energy	Decommissioned 2018
Calder gas field	110/2b, 110/la, 110/lc, 110/Sa, 110/9a and 110/14		Calder platform		Rivers terminal	Oct 2004	Operated by HRL on behalf of ConocoPhillips	
Conwy oil field	110/12						EOG	
Cossens gas field	110						ConocoPhillips	Not yet developed
Dalton gas field	110/2b		subsea		Morecambe North platform	Aug 1999	Operated by HRL on behalf of ConocoPhillips	
Darwen gas field	110/8b						ConocoPhillips	Not yet developed
Douglas gas field	110/13	Triassic	DA (jack-up), DD, DW, Floating oil storage unit (FSU)	Tanker	Point of Ayr terminal	Jan 1996	Hamilton Brothers, then BHP, then Eni Liverpool Bay	
Hamilton gas field	110/13a	Triassic	Hamilton A platform		Douglas installation	Feb 1997	Hamilton Brothers, then BHP, then Eni Liverpool Bay	
Hamilton North gas field	110/13a	Triassic	Hamilton North platform		Douglas complex	Dec 1995	Hamilton Brothers, then BHP, then Eni Liverpool Bay	
Lennox oil/gas field	110/15	Triassic	Lennox platform	Douglas complex		Mar 1996	Hamilton Brothers, then BHP, then Eni Liverpool Bay	
Millom gas field	113/26a 113/27a	Triassic	Millom West platform		Morecambe North platform	Aug 1999	Burlington Resources	
Morecambe South gas field	110/2a, 110/3a, 110/7a and 110/8a	Triassic	CPP1 platform, DP1, DP3, DP4, DP6, DP8 platforms		South Morecambe Terminal	Jan 1985	Centrica Hydrocarbon Resources Limited, Spirit Energy	Decommissioning underway 2019
Morecambe North gas field	110/2	Triassic	Morecambe North platform		Morecambe North platform	Oct 1994	Centrica Hydrocarbon Resources Limited	
Rhyl gas field	113/27b	Triassic	subsea		Morecambe North platform	Apr 2013	Centrica	

=== Germany ===
==== Onshore ====
- Wietze near Hanover, discovered in 1859
- The Schoenebeek field of the Netherlands extends across the border

==== Offshore ====
- Mittelplate, approx. 2 Mio m^{3}/a of crude oil production
- A6/B4, gas field 300 km in the North Sea, gas transport via the NOGAT pipeline
- Schwedeneck-See oil field (Baltic Sea)
- A6-A platform

=== Denmark ===
==== Onshore ====
No onshore developments

==== Offshore ====
Offshore development is abundant. Of the 19 fields, 15 are operated by Total Energies Exploration and Production Danmark (Formerly Maersk Oil and Gas) as part of the Dansk Undergrunds Consortium, with the remaining 4 operated by DONG Energy (3) and Hess (1).

- Cecilie oil field - sandstone reservoir, see Siri, Nini and Cecilie oil fields
- Dagmar oil field - chalk reservoir, satellite of Gorm field
- Dan oil field - chalk reservoir
- Gorm oil and gas field - chalk reservoir
- Halfdan field - chalk reservoir
- Harald gas field - chalk reservoir
- Igor field - chalk reservoir, satellite of Halfdan field
- Kraka oil field - chalk reservoir, satellite of Dan oil field
- Lulita gas field - sandstone reservoir, satellite of Harald gas field
- Nils prospect, see Regnar Dan oil field
- Nini oil field - sandstone reservoir, see Siri, Nini and Cecilie oil fields
- Ravn oil field - sandstone reservoir
- Regnar oil field - chalk reservoir, satellite of Dan oil field
- Roar oil field - chalk reservoir, satellite of Tyra oil and gas fie
- Rolf oil field - chalk reservoir, satellite of Gorm field
- Sif field - chalk reservoir, satellite of Halfdan field
- Siri oil field - sandstone reservoir, see Siri, Nini and Cecilie oil fields
- Skjold oil field - chalk reservoir
- South Arne oil and gas field - chalk reservoir
- Svend oil field - chalk reservoir, satellite of Tyra oil and gas field
- Tyra oil and gas field - chalk reservoir
- Tyra Southeast oil field - chalk reservoir, satellite of Tyra oil and gas field
- Valdemar oil and gas field - chalk reservoir

=== Norway ===
==== Onshore ====
No onshore developments

==== Offshore ====
Serviced from Stavanger, Bergen, Kristiansund, Haugesund

Southern North Sea

- Ivar Aasen oil field
- Johan Sverdrup oil field

Central North Sea

- Yme field - operated by Repsol
- Hod oil field - chalk reservoir, operated by AkerBP
- Valhall oil field - chalk reservoir, operated by AkerBP
- Eldfisk - chalk reservoir, operated by ConocoPhillips
- Ekofisk - chalk reservoir, operated by ConocoPhillips
- Embla oil field - Devonian / Permian reservoir, operated by ConocoPhillips
- Tor oil field - chalk reservoir, operated by ConocoPhillips
- Albuskjell oilfield - decommissioned
- Tambar oil field - Upper Jurassic sandstone reservoir, operated by AkerBP
- Ula oil field - Jurassic sandstone reservoir, operated by AkerBP
- Gyda oil field - Jurassic sandstone reservoir, operated by Repsol
- Blane oil field - Paleocene sandstone reservoir, operated by Repsol
- Oselvar oil field - decommissioned
- Cod oil field - decommissioned
- Njord oil field, operated by Statoil

Northern North Sea

- Sleipner oil field - Jurassic and Palaeocene reservoirs, operated by Statoil
- Brisling oil field
- Bream oil field
- Balder oil field - Palaeocene/Eocene, operated by ExxonMobil
- Frigg gas field - large Eocene reservoir gas field
- Gudrun gas/oil field - Jurassic reservoir, high pressure, being developed by Equinor
- Hild gas field
- Heimdal gas field - Palaeocene reservoir, operated by Equinor
- Vale gas field - operated by Equinor
- Oseberg oil field Middle Jurassic sandstone reservoir operated by Equinor
- Grane oil field - operated by Equinor
- Brage oil field - operated by Wintershall
- Troll - largest gas field in North Sea, operated by Equinor
- Gullfaks oil field - Middle Jurassic reservoir, operated by Equinor
- Statfjord - along strike from Brent, but structurally deeper, partially in UK sector; operated by Equinor
- Snorre oil field - Middle Jurassic reservoir, operated by Equinor
- Marihøne oil field - operated in partnership by Marathon Oil, ConocoPhillips and Lundin Petroleum
- Murchison oil field (part of; produced through UK) operated by Canadian Natural Resources Limited
- Agat
- Haltenbank - numerous developments in production, including Heidrun gasfied, Draugen oil field, and Ormen Lange

Associated - not North Sea

=== Ireland (includes Northern Ireland) ===
==== Onshore ====
- Larne - tiny prospect under the basalts
- Other small prospects, and significant coal-bed methane

==== Offshore ====
- Kinsale Head - gas development off the coast of County Cork, exhausted and now proposed for use as carbon dioxide or natural gas storage
- Corrib gas field - about to start production to an onshore processing plant
- Inishbeg - prospect announced to the north-west of County Donegal; due to be drilled August 2006
- Barryroe - oil and gas discovery south of Cork; appraisal results formally announced March 2012
- Dunquin - off Irish west coast; owned by ExxonMobil, Repsol, Providence and Sosina; drilling was to start in 2013 on a potentially large field
- Spanish Point - field due for exploration in 2013, due north of Dunquin, off County Clare on the Irish west coast
- Dalkey Island - Irish Sea prospect

=== Faroes ===
==== Offshore ====
- Various blocks licensed for exploration, several discoveries not yet developed

=== Iceland ===
==== Offshore ====
- Nothing published, but the idea is not inconceivable on the ridges extending towards Iceland from the Faroes and the East Greenland Coast

=== East Greenland ===
==== Onshore ====
- No prospects reported, though sediments analogous to the Mesozoic and Caenozoic deposits of the North Sea are known, so there is appreciable interest. Development would be formidably difficult, technically, logistically and politically.

==== Offshore ====
- A recent conference on hydrocarbon prospects in arctic Russia (Geological Society, London; February 2006) had several speakers mention major gas prospectivity on the East Greenland coast, but they cited no sources. A conference volume was due towards the end of 2006, which may elaborate.

=== Barents Sea ===
==== Onshore ====
- No significant prospects or potential

==== Offshore ====
Serviced from Harstad and Hammerfest

- Significant exploration, appraisal and development. Major discoveries are the Snøhvit gasfield and the Johan Castberg field (in development), operated by Equinor and the Alta/Gohta field (early phase), operated by Lundin Petroleum, both in the Norwegian sector and the Stokhmanovskoye gasfield planned to be operated by Gazprom in the Russian sector.

== See also ==
- Norwegian oil fields
- List of oil and gas fields in Albania
- List of oil fields
- Economy of Norway
- Economy of the United Kingdom
- Geology of the United Kingdom
- Oil platform
