= Tolmount gas field =

UK gas field in the North Sea

- Country: United Kingdom
- Region: North Sea
- Location/block: 42/28d
- Offshore/onshore: Offshore
- Coordinates: 54°02’24”N 00°26’24”E
- Operator: Harbour Energy
- Partners: Dana Petroleum, Harbour Energy

Field history
- Discovery: 2011
- Start of production: TBC

Production
- Estimated gas in place: 1,000×10^{9} cu ft (28×10^{9} m^{3})
- Producing formations: lower Leman Sandstone

The Tolmount gas field is a natural gas reservoir and production facility in the UK sector of the southern North Sea, about 36 km of east of Flamborough Head, Yorkshire. It is due to start production in 2022.

== The field ==
The Tolmount field extends over UK offshore Blocks 42/28c, 42/28d and 42/28e. The field was discovered in 2011 by well 42/28d-12 drilled by the Ensco 92. The reservoir is a lower Leman Sandstone formation and has reserves of 1,000 billion cubic feet (bcf), 540 bcf in the main field, 220 bcf in Tolmount East and 150 bcf in Tolmount Far East.

The Tolmount gas field is jointly owned by Dana Petroleum (50%) and Harbour Energy (50%), ODE Asset Management Limited operates the platform infrastructure.

== Development ==
Production from the field will be developed in stages. In the first stage (Tolmount Main) gas is produced by an offshore platform and piped to Easington gas terminal. Later stages will entail development of other parts of the field such as Tolmount East produced back to the platform.

Details of the field infrastructure are as shown.

Tolmount installations
Platform name	Tolmount	Tolmount East
Installation type	Fixed Steel platform	Subsea wellhead
Coordinates	54°02’24”N 00°26’24”E	54°3'55"N 0°28'42"E
Function	Integrated minimum facilities wellhead and production	Wellhead
Crew	Not permanently attended	–
Year commissioned	2021	2023?
Water depth, metres	50	
Design (FEED)	Wood Group	
Design and Construction	Rosetti Marino Ravenna Italy	
Jacket weight, tonnes	2,350	–
Topsides dimensions, metres	32 x 34	–
Topsides weight, tonnes	1,456	–
No. of legs	4	–
No. of well slots	6	–
No. of Wells	4	1
Gas processing capacity	300 MMSCFD	–
Production to	Easington terminal	Tolmount platform
Pipeline length and diameter	48.4 km, 20-inch	4 km, 12-inch
Pipeline Number	PL4849	
Methanol import	Piggyback on 20-inch line	Umbilical
Pipeline length and diameter	48.4 km, 3-inch	4 km,
Pipeline Number	PL4850	

The gas pipeline is known as the Humber Gathering System. It is intended that other prospects in the area, e.g. Mongour, can use the system.

In addition to the Tolmount offshore facilities a new gas process facility was constructed at the Easington terminal to receive and treat the gas prior to shipment into the National Transmission System.

== See also ==
- Easington gas terminal
- List of oil and gas fields of the North Sea
