= Greater Markham Area gas fields =

Natural gas deposits

Markham gas field
- Country: United Kingdom and Netherlands
- Region: southern North Sea
- Location/blocks: 49/5a and 49/10b (UK), J3b and J6 (NL)
- Offshore/onshore: Offshore
- Coordinates: 53° 50.527’ N 02° 52.059’ E
- Operators: see text

Field history
- Discovery: July 1974
- Start of production: 1992
- Peak of production: 1995
- Abandonment: 2019

Production
- Recoverable gas: 19.8×10^{9} m^{3} (700×10^{9} cu ft)
- Producing formations: Permian sandstone

The Greater Markham Area gas fields are natural gas reservoirs and gas production facilities that straddled, or are close to, the UK and Netherlands median line of the southern North Sea. The UK field production facilities, which export gas to the Netherlands, began operation in 1992.

== The fields ==
The Greater Markham Area gas fields are located in UK Blocks 49/4, 49/5, 49/9 and 49/10 and in Netherlands Blocks J3 and J6 of the southern North Sea. The fields are named: Markham, Windermere, Chiswick, Grove, Stamford and Kew.

=== Markham ===
The Markham gas field was discovered by Ultramar in July 1984 with well 49/05-2. It is a lower Permian Leman/Slochteren sandstone, sourced from Carboniferous coal measures and is overlaid with Permian Silverpit claystone. It is a sweet gas with 83 % methane and a gas/condensate ratio of 9 barrels per million standard cubic feet (9 bbl/MMSCF) or 52.2 m^{3}/10^{6} m^{3}. Recoverable reserves were estimated to be 700 Billion cubic feet (BCF) or 19.8 billion m^{3}. Ownership of the gas was established by the UK/Netherlands Markham Treaty as 37.40 % UK and 62.60 % Netherlands.

The original licensee for Markham was a joint venture comprising Ultramar Exploration Ltd (89.50 %), DNO Offshore Ltd (8.00 %) and Ranger Oil (UK) Ltd (2.5 %.). Ownership passed to CH_{4} Energy Ltd in 2003, Venture Production acquired ownership in 2006. Ownership eventually passed to Centrica, then in 2017 to Spirit Energy a joint venture of Centrica plc and Bayerngas Norge AS.

=== Windermere ===
The UK Windermere gas field produced gas to Markham and hence to the Netherlands. Windermere is a Rotliegend-Leman sandstone discovered in 1989 by well 49/09b-2 by Mobil (who named the field Avalon) and had an estimated gas in place of 104 BCF or 2.8 million m^{3}.

=== Chiswick, Grove and Kew ===
The Chiswick and Kew are both Carboniferous fields Chiswick has gas in place of 687 BCF or 19.45 million m^{3} and Kew 85 BCF or 2.41 million m^{3}.

== Development ==
The Greater Markham Area gas fields were developed in stages. Markham and Windermere gas fields were the first to be developed in 1994 and 1996. Gas was produced by two offshore installations, detailed in the table.

Offshore platforms Markham and Windermere
Installation	Markham ST-1	Windermere
Blocks	49/5a and 49/10b (UK), J3b and J6 (NL)	49/9b
Coordinates	53° 50.527’ N 02° 52.059’ E	53° 49.937’ N 02° 46.364’ E
Owner	Spirit Energy	Ineos UK SNS Ltd
Type	Normally unattended	Normally unattended
Water depth, metres	31	35
Installation date	1994	November 1996
Jacket type	Fixed steel	Fixed steel
Jacket legs	4	3
Jacket piles	4	3
Jacket weight, tonnes	888	382
Topsides dimensions, metres	26.3m x 22m	30m x 30m
Topsides weight, tonnes	1,300	452
Wellheads	6	2
Export to	Markham J6-A	Markham ST-1
Production start	November 1992	April 1997

The Chiswick, Grove, Kew and Stamford gas fields were developed over the period 2006-2014 by four offshore installations, detailed in the table.

Offshore installations Chiswick, Grove, Kew and Stanford
Installation	Chiswick	Grove	Kew	Stamford
Blocks	49/4a	49/10a	49/4c	49/10c
Coordinates	53.939967 2.7740533	53.858778 2.886000	53.954935 2.784486	53.804192 2.836928
Owner	Spirit	Spirit	Spirit	Spirit
Type	Platform	Platform	Subsea wellheads	Subsea wellheads
Water depth, metres	40	30	41	34
Installation date	2006	2006	2014	2009
Jacket type	Fixed steel	Fixed steel	–	–
Jacket legs			–	–
Jacket piles			–	–
Jacket weight, tonnes	650	500	–	–
Topsides weight, tonnes	350	480	–	–
Wellheads			1	1
Export to	Markham J6-A	Markham J6-A	Chiswick	Markham J6-A
Production start	2006	2006	2014	2009

In addition to the platforms and subsea wells there were also gas and methanol pipelines and umbilicals in the Greater Markham area.

Pipelines and Umbilicals
From – To	Country	Fluid	Diameter, inches	Length, km	Pipeline number
Markham ST-1 – Median line	UK	Gas	12	2.35	PL992
Median line – J6A	Netherlands	Gas	12	3.13	PL992
J6A – Median line	Netherlands	Methanol	2	3.127	PL993
Median line – Markham ST-1	UK	Methanol	2	2.347	PL993
Windermere – Markham ST-1	UK	Gas	8	6.8	PL1273
Markham ST-1 – Windermere	UK	Methanol	2	6.8	PL1273.1-3
Chiswick – J6A	UK, Netherlands	Gas	10	18.3	PL2353
J6A – Chiswick	UK, Netherlands	Methanol	1.5	18.3	PL2354
Grove – J6A	UK, Netherlands	Gas	10	13.4	PL2319
J6A – Grove	UK, Netherlands	Methanol	2	13.4	PL2320
Stamford – J6A	UK, Netherlands	Gas	6	7.5	PL2367
J6A – Stamford	UK, Netherlands	Methanol		7.5	PLU2368
Kew – Chiswick	UK	Gas	6	3.1	PL2974
Chiswick – Kew	UK	Methanol		3.1	PLU2975

== Production ==
Gas production from Greater Markham Area fields is shown in the table and the graphs.

Gas Production
Field	Production start	Peak flow, mcm/y	Peak year	Production ceased	Cumulative production to 2020 (mcm)
Markham	November 1992	933	1995	April 2016	7,877
Windermere	April 1997	438	1998	April 2016	2217
Chiswick	2007	569	2009	–	6915
Grove	2007	636	2010	–	3873
Kew	2014	175	2014	–	1053
Stamford	2009	132	2009	2013	165

Production profile, in mcm/y, of the Markham field
Production profile, in mcm/y, of the Windermere field
Production profile, in mcm/y, of the Chiswick field
Production profile, in mcm/y, of the Grove field
Production profile, in mcm/y, of the Kew field
Production profile, in mcm/y, of the Stamford field

== Decommissioning ==
Spirit Energy submitted a Markham ST-1 decommissioning Programme to the Oil and as Authority in 2018. Ineos Oil & Gas UK submitted a Windermere decommissioning Programme to the Oil and as Authority in 2018. Decommissioning activities entailed plugging and abandonment of the wells and removal of all structures above the seabed. The Markham topsides were taken to Lerwick Shetland for dismantling.

== See also ==
- List of oil and gas fields of the North Sea
- Minke, Orca, Sillimanite and Wingate gas fields
