= York gas field =

UK gas field in the North Sea

- Country: United Kingdom
- Region: North Sea
- Location/blocks: 47/2a
- Offshore/onshore: Offshore
- Coordinates: 53°54’35”N 0°34’41"E
- Operators: Centrica, Spirit Energy
- Owner: Centrica, Spirit Energy

Field history
- Start of production: 2013

Production
- Recoverable gas: 120×10^{9} cu ft (3.4×10^{9} m^{3})

The York gas field is a natural gas reservoir and production facility in the UK sector of the southern North Sea, about 34 km of east of the Yorkshire coast. It has been in production since March 2013.

== The field ==
The York field extends over UK Blocks 47/2a, 47/3a, 47/3d and 47/3e. The field was discovered in 1993 by well 47/02-1 drilled by the Noble Julie Robinson. The reservoir has reserves of 106 billion cubic feet or 3 billion cubic metres.

Centrica owned and developed the York gas field, now owned and operated by Spirit Energy.

== Development ==
Production from the field was developed by a single offshore platform. Details of the platform are as shown.

York installation
Platform name	York
Installation type	Fixed Steel platform
Coordinates	53°54′35″N 0°34′41″E
Function	Integrated wellhead and production
Crew	Not permanently attended
Year commissioned	2013
Water depth	43 m (141 ft)
Design and construction	Heerema Fabrication Group
Construction	Hartlepool
Jacket weight, tonnes	1,450
Topsides dimensions	20 m × 15 m × 16 m (66 ft × 49 ft × 52 ft)
Topsides weight, tonnes	1,300
No. of legs	4
No. of well slots	6
No. of Wells	2 at initial start
Gas processing capacity	120 million cubic feet per day
Production to	Easington terminal
Pipeline length and diameter	34 km, 16-inch
Pipeline Number	PL
Methanol import	from Easington
Pipeline length	34 km (21 mi)
Pipeline diameter	3 in (76 mm)
Pipeline Number	PL

In addition to the York offshore facilities a new gas process facility was constructed at the Easington terminal to receive and treat the gas prior to shipment into the National Transmission System.

The production profile (in million standard cubic feet) of gas from the York field was as shown.

Production profile (in million standard cubic feet) of gas

In 2019 the York pipeline was routed to the Dimlington terminal to access low pressure compression, thereby extending the field life.

== See also ==
- Easington gas terminal
- List of oil and gas fields of the North Sea
