= Saturn Banks Project gas fields =

UK gas fields in the North Sea

The Saturn Banks Project comprises six natural gas reservoirs and gas production facilities in the southern North Sea, 35-55 km north east of Bacton, Norfolk. The fields are under development and first gas is due in 2022.

== The fields ==
The Saturn Banks Project includes the Blythe, Elgood, Southwark, Elland, Nailsworth and Goddard gas fields in the UK offshore Quadrants 48 and 49.

Details of the gas fields is summarised in the table.

Saturn Banks field data
Field name	Blythe	Elgood	Southwark	Elland	Nailsworth	Goddard
Former name			Vulcan South	Vulcan East	Vulcan North West	Glein
Blocks	48/22	48/23	49/21c	49/21a	48/25a,b	48/11
Year discovered	1966	1991	2000	2006	1987	1994
Original licensee	Burmah	Enterprise Oil	ConocoPhillips	Silverstone Energy	Shell/Exxon	Arco
Gas reservoir geology	Permian Rotliegend	Rotliegend	Rotliegend	Rotliegend	Rotliegend	
Gas in place, billion cubic feet	33	22	94.2	55	99.4	132

== Development ==
The Saturn Banks Project is being developed by IOG plc as the project operator; it holds a 50% stake and CalEnergy Resources (UK) also holds a 50% stake.

The gas fields are developed in stages. The first phase comprised the Blythe, Elgood and Southwark fields. These are developed by offshore platforms, subsea wellheads and pipelines. Details are summarised in the table.

Saturn Banks Installations
Field	Blythe	Elgood	Southwark
Block	4/22	48/23	49/21
Installation name	Blythe	–	Southwark
Installation type	Fixed steel platform	Subsea wellhead	Fixed steel platform
Coordinates		53° 18.331'N 01° 23.171'E	
Installed	June 2021		June 2021
Water depth, metres	30	30	30
Substructure weight, tonnes	1,050		1,300
Topsides weight, tonnes	750	–	900
No. of legs	Monotower	–	4
No. of Wells	1	1	3
Gas export to	Blythe hub on Thames pipeline	Blythe	Southwark hub on Thames pipeline
Export pipeline length, diameter	24.5 km, 12-inch	9.1 km, 6-inch	5.9 km, 24-inch
Pipeline number (gas)			PL4943
Control umbilical/ methanol supply	To Elgood	From Blythe	–
Umbilical length, diameter	9.1 km, 5-inch		–
Umbilical/Pipeline number			–

The pipelines from Blythe and Southwark platforms are tied into the reused Thames to Bacton 24-inch pipeline (PL370), renamed the Saturn Banks Pipeline System.

In addition to the offshore development the Saturn Banks reception facilities at Bacton gas terminal were installed.

Later phases of the Saturn Banks Project will include the Nailsworth, Elland and Goddard gas fields. Nailsworth is projected to be produced through the Southwark platform.

== See also ==
- Thames gas field
- Bacton gas terminal
- List of oil and gas fields of the North Sea
