= Breagh gas field =

UK natural gas field

- Country: United Kingdom
- Region: North Sea
- Location/blocks: 42/13a and 42/12a
- Offshore/onshore: Offshore
- Coordinates: 54°42′21″N 00°26′09″E
- Operator: INEOS
- Owner: INEOS (70 %) Sterling Resources (30 %)

Field history
- Discovery: July 1997
- Start of production: 2013

Production
- Estimated gas in place: 600×10^{9} cu ft (17×10^{9} m^{3})
- Producing formations: Lower Carboniferous Sandstone

The Breagh gas field is a natural gas reservoir and production facility in the UK sector of the southern North Sea. It is about 100 km of east of Teesside and started gas production in 2013.

== The field ==
The Breagh field extends over UK offshore Blocks 42/13a and 42/12a. The field was discovered in July 1997 by well 42/13-2. The reservoir is a Lower Carboniferous Sandstone formation and has reserves of 600 billion cubic feet.

The Breagh gas field is jointly owned by INEOS (70%) and Sterling Resources (30%), INEOS operates the infrastructure. RWE Dea was the original 70% owner and operator but this interest was transferred to INEOS in 2015.

== Development ==
Production from the field is developed in stages. In the first stage gas is produced by wells on the offshore platform Breagh Alpha and then via pipeline to the Teesside Gas Processing Plant at Seal Sands. Later stages will entail development of the eastern part of the field produced back to a new Breagh Bravo platform.

Details of the Breagh A field infrastructure are as shown.

Breagh A installation
Platform name	Breagh
Installation type	Fixed Steel platform
Coordinates	54°42’21”N 00°26’09”E
Function	Integrated minimum facilities wellhead and production
Crew	Not permanently attended
Platform installed	October 2011
First gas	October 2013
Water depth, metres	62
Design and Construction	Heeremaa Vlissingen, Netherlands
Jacket weight, tonnes	2,300
Topsides dimensions, metres	
Topsides weight, tonnes	1,200
No. of legs	4 (8 piles)
No. of well slots	12
No. of Wells	8
Gas processing capacity	6.4 million cubic metres (225 million cubic feet) per day
Production to	Teesside Gas Processing Plant
Pipeline length and diameter	100 km, 20-inch
Pipeline Number	PL2768.1 PL2768.2
Methanol import	From shore by pipeline
Pipeline length and diameter	100 km, 3-inch
Pipeline Number	PL2769.1 PL2769.2

The export pipeline from Breagh runs 100 km to shore at Coatham Sands. From here a 10 km onshore pipeline carries gas to the Teesside Gas Processing Plant (TGPP).

The entry specification for 3rd party gas into the export pipeline is:

Breagh to Teesside pipeline entry specification
Parameter	Value
Gross Calorific Value	37.5 - 42.3 MJ/m^{3}
Oxygen	9 ppm max
Carbon Dioxide	2.8% mol max
Hydrogen Sulphide	3 ppm max
Total Sulphur	14.4 ppm max
Wobbe Index	47.5 - 51.2 MJ/m^{3}

In addition to the Breagh offshore facilities a new gas process facility was constructed at Seal Sands, the Teesside Gas Processing Plant which received and treated the gas prior to shipment into the National Transmission System.

== Production ==
Gas production from the Breagh field in million standard cubic feet (MMSCF)

Data for 2021 is for January to October inclusive.

== See also ==
- Central Area Transmission System
- List of oil and gas fields of the North Sea
