= Brigantine, Caravel, Corvette and Shamrock gas fields =

Natural gas reservoirs and gas production facilities in the southern North Sea

Corvette gas field
- Country: United Kingdom
- Region: Southern North Sea
- Location/blocks: 49/24
- Offshore/onshore: Offshore
- Coordinates: 53.231944N 2.622778E
- Operator: Shell
- Owner: Shell Esso

Field history
- Discovery: 1996
- Start of production: 1999

Production
- Recoverable gas: 211×10^{9} cu ft (6.0×10^{9} m^{3})
- Producing formations: Rotliegendes

The Brigantine, Caravel, Corvette and Shamrock fields are natural gas reservoirs and gas production facilities in the southern North Sea, close to the UK/Netherlands median line. The fields have produced natural gas since 1999.

== The fields ==
The Brigantine, Caravel, Corvette and Shamrock gas fields are located in the adjacent UK Offshore Blocks 49/19, 49/20 and 49/24. Brigantine, Caravel and Corvette follow Shell's convention of naming southern North Sea fields after types of sailing vessels. Brigantine has four gas accumulations designated A-D. The gas reservoirs have the following characteristics.

Reservoir characteristics
| Reservoir | Brigantine A | Brigantine B | Brigantine C | Brigantine D | Shamrock | Caravel | Corvette |
| Block | 49/19 | 49/19 | 49/19 | 49/19 | 49/20a | 49/20 | 49/24 |
| Year discovered | 1986 | 1997 | 1998 | 2001 | 1971 | 2002 | 1996 |
| Gas reservoir | Rotliegend | | | | | | Rotliegend |
| Gas reserves | 280 billion cubic feet or 10 billion cubic metres | | | | | | 211 billion cubic feet |

== Development ==
The gas producing capability of the fields was realised through five offshore platforms, their characteristics are summarised in the table.##2 1 3 7

Installation characteristics
| Installation | Brigantine BR | Brigantine BG | Shamrock QS | Caravel QR | Corvette CV |
| Block | 49/19 | 49/19 | 49/20a | 49/20a | 49/24 |
| Coordinates | 53.442744 2.698202 | 53.402498 2.656400 | 53.495192 2.974531 | 53.542131 3.025706 | 53.231944 2.622778 |
| Water depth, m | 29 | 29 | 29 | 30 | 29 |
| Owner | Shell | Shell | Shell | Shell | Shell |
| Type | Fixed steel | Fixed steel | Monotower | Monotower | Fixed steel |
| Substructure weight, tonnes | 360 | 394 | 180 | 270 | 910 |
| Topsides weight, tonnes | 152 | 162 | 270 | 180 | 970 |
| Production start | 2001 | 2001 | 2008 | 2008 | 1999 |
| Production export (by pipeline) to | Brigantine BG | Corvette CV | Caravel QR | Corvette CV | Leman A complex |
| Export pipeline, length and diameter | 5.4 km, 20” | 19.6 km, 20” | 4.95 km, 16” | 33.3 km, 16” | 36.6 km, 20” |

== Production ==
Gas production from the fields is summarised in the table. Gas from these installations flows to the Leman A complex and from there to the Bacton gas terminal.

Gas production
| Reservoir | Brigantine A | Brigantine B | Brigantine C | Brigantine D | Shamrock | Caravel | Corvette |
| Production start | 2001 | 2001 | 2002 | 2003 | 2008 | 2008 | 1999 |
| Peak production, mcm/y | 639 | 573 | 655 | 35 | 411 | 873 | 1,782 |
| Peak year | 2003 | 2001 | 2003 | 2006 | 2010 | 2011 | 1999 |
| Cumulative production, mcm/y | 2,673 | 1,561 | 2,247 | 90 | 1,137 | 2,568 | 4,780 |
| End of production | 2008 | 2008 | 2008 | 2008 | | | 2009 |

Production profile, in mcm/y, of the Corvette field

== See also ==
- Leman gas field
- Bacton gas terminal
- List of oil and gas fields of the North Sea
