= Davy, Bessemer, Beaufort, Brown and Boyle gas fields =

Gas reservoirs in the North Sea

The Davy, Bessemer, Beaufort, Brown and Boyle gas fields are natural gas reservoirs and gas production facilities in two locations in the southern North Sea. The fields produced natural gas from 1995.

== History ==
The Davy gas field was discovered as early as 1970 but there was limited local infrastructure to transport gas to shore. The Bessemer and Beaufort fields were discovered in 1989 and 1991 by wells 49/23-5 and 49/23-7 respectively. The improved production technology in the late 1980s made the development of the fields viable. Technology included horizontal wells and minimum topsides facilities. Gas from the fields was routed to Indefatigable 49/23AT for compression.

== The gas fields ==
The Davy, Bessemer, Beaufort, Brown and Boyle gas fields are located in the UK Offshore Blocks 49/30 and 53/05. The fields were initially developed by Amoco, which merged with BP in 1998. Perenco assumed ownership in 2003 and were responsible for later developments. The fields are named after British and Irish scientists, engineers and inventors: namely Humphry Davy, Henry Bessemer, Francis Beaufort, Charles Brown and Robert Boyle.

The characteristics of the gas reservoirs and the production facilities are summarised in the table.

Installation	Davy	Davy North	Davy East	Bessemer	Beaufort	Boyle	Brown
UK Offshore Block	49/30 53/5a	49/30a	53/5b	49/23e	49/23	49/30	49/30
Coordinates	53.051969°N 3.011500°E	53.096661°N 2.843161°E	52.983394°N 2.974469°E	53.331961°N 2.508322°E			
Gas reservoir	Rotliegend variable isopach			Rotliegend Leman sandstone			As Davy
Field discovered	1970			1989	1991	1989	1998
Gas in place, billion cubic feet	164			90	30		
Installation type	Monotower	Subsea wellhead	Subsea wellhead	Monotower	Wellhead	Wellhead	Wellhead
Water depth, metres	34	34	41	28	29	34	
Substructure weight, tonnes	794			780	–	–	–
Topsides weight, tonnes	513	–	–	481	–	–	–
No. of Wells	4	1	1	3	1 - drilled from Bessemer	From Davy	From Davy
Gas export to	Inde 49/23AT	Davy	Davy	Inde 49/23AT	–	Davy	Davy
Export pipeline length, diameter	42.37 km, 16-inch	10.31 km, 8-inch	5.71 km, 6-inch	15.59 km, 16-inch	–	–	–
Pipeline number	PL1053	PL1871	PL2344	PL1055	–	–	–
Start of production	1995	2001	2007	1995	1996	2002	2001
Peak flow, million cubic metres/y	930		93	1,204	1	456	118
Year of peak flow	1996		2007	2000	2001	2003	2001
Cumulative production to end of 2014, million cubic metres	5,810		280	5,410	1	1,758	324

== Gas production ==
Bessemer also receives gas from the N.W, Bell wellhead (49/23) via a 9.45 km, 6-inch pipeline.

The Davy and Bessemer installations export gas to the Indefatigable 49/23AT platform which has reception facilities for the 16-inch pipelines from Davy and Bessemer. After processing the gas is routed, along with Inde gas, to the Bacton gas terminal.

Gas production profile, in mcm/y, for Davy
Gas production profile, in mcm/y, for Bessemer

Production from Davy North and Beaufort has ceased.

== See also ==
- Indefatigable gas field
- Bacton gas terminal
- List of oil and gas fields of the North Sea
