= Tyne, Trent and Tors gas fields =

UK gas fields in the North Sea

Trent gas field
- Country: United Kingdom
- Region: North Sea
- Location/blocks: 43/24
- Offshore/onshore: Offshore
- Coordinates: 54°17′59″N 01°39′35″E
- Operators: ARCO, Perenco
- Owner: ARCO, Talisman; Perenco

Field history
- Discovery: March 1991
- Abandonment: 2020

Production
- Estimated gas in place: 415×10^{9} cu ft (11.8×10^{9} m^{3})
- Producing formations: Carboniferous

The Tyne, Trent and Tors gas fields are depleted natural gas reservoirs and former gas production facilities in the southern North Sea, centred around the Trent installation about 115 km east of Flamborough Head, Yorkshire. The fields produced gas from 1996 to 2020.

== The fields ==
The Tyne, Trent and Tors (Kilmar and Garrow) gas fields are located in UK Offshore Blocks 44/18a, 43/24, 43/22a, 42/25a and 43/21a. Tyne and Trent are named after English rivers that flow into the North Sea. Kilmar and Garrow are named after Tors in Cornwall, and together were referred to as the Tors development. The gas reservoirs have the following characteristics.

Reservoir characteristics
Field	Tyne	Trent	Kilmar	Garrow
Blocks	44/18a	43/24	43/22a	42/25a, 43/21a
Discovered	January 1992	March 1991	1992	1991
Original Licensee	ARCO/Talisman	ARCO/Talisman	ATP Oil & Gas (UK) Limited	ATP Oil & Gas (UK) Limited
Reservoir type	Carboniferous	Carboniferous	Carboniferous	Rotliegendes
Recoverable reserves	415 billion cubic feet (bcf)		311 bcf	

== Development ==
The Tyne, Trent, Kilmar and Garrow gas fields were developed over the period 1996 to 2008. Gas was produced by five offshore installations, detailed in the table.

Offshore installations
Installation	Tyne	Trent TP	Trent compression TC	Kilmar	Garrow
Offshore Block	44/18a	43/24	43/24	43/22a	42/25a
Coordinates	54.591667 4.611111	54.446833 1.748789	54.444114 1.743375	54.290617 1.336208	54.273250 0.99633
Initial Owner	ARCO	ARCO	Perenco	ATP Oil & Gas (UK) Limited	ATP Oil & Gas (UK) Limited
Later Owners	Perenco	Perenco	Perenco	Alpha Petroleum	Alpha Petroleum
Function	Wellhead, Production	Wellhead, Production	Production, compression	Wellhead, Production	Wellhead, Production
Crew	Normally unattended		Bridge linked to Trent	Normally unattended	Normally unattended
Water depth, metres	18	49	49	54	54
Installation date	1996	1996	2005	2006	2006
Jacket type	Fixed steel	Fixed steel	Fixed steel	Fixed steel	Fixed steel
Jacket legs	4	4	4	4	4
Jacket piles	4		Suction piles		
Jacket weight, tonnes	665	1,540	1,583	1,152	
Topsides dimensions, metres	20 x 21		30 x 30		
Topsides weight, tonnes	785	2,668	1,418	424	
Well slots, wellheads	?, 5	9,	nil	3	3, 2
Export to	Trent TP via 56.5 km 20” pipeline	Bacton gas terminal via 164 km 24” pipeline	–	Trent via 21.2 km 12” pipeline	Kilmar via 22.4 km 8” pipeline
Production start	November 1996	November 1996	2005	2006	2007

Gas export from Trent reused the 24” Esmond to Bacton pipeline (Esmond Transmission System) to the Bacton gas terminal, also known as EAGLES East Anglia Gas and Liquids Evacuation System pipeline.

== Production ==
On the Tyne installation fluids from the wellheads were routed to the 3-phase Production Separator. The gas and condensate streams were metered then cojoined and sent to the pipeline to Trent. Separated water was metered and passed to the Produced Water Filter before disposal overboard.

On Trent the fluids from Tyne were routed to a slug catcher then comingled with Trent gas from the Trent Production Separator. The combined gas stream was routed across the bridge to the TC platform. Here it passed successively to a Separator, LP Compressor, Cooler, Separator, HP Compressor, Cooler and Discharge Scrubber. The gas stream was routed back to the Production platform. Here it was dried by counter current contact with Tri-Ethylene Glycol before being sent to Bacton.

An outline of the gas production from the fields is summarised in the table.

Gas Production
Name	Tyne South	Tyne North	Trent	Kilmar	Garrow
Production start	November 1996	1997	November 1996	2006	2007
Peak flow, mcm/y	539	255	521	271	53
Peak year	1997	1998	1999	2007	2007
Cumulative production to 2014	3,094	1,139	3,350	1,247	172
Production ceased	November 2015	November 2015	June 2020	June 2020	June 2020

Production profile, in mcm/y, of the Trent field

== Decommissioning ==
Perenco submitted a Decommissioning Programme for the Tyne installation to the UK Oil & Gas Authority in 2018. This will entail plugging and abandoning the wells and removal of all structures above the sea bed. Following shutdown of the Trent platform in 2020 Alpha Petroleum announced the Kilmar and Garrow would be shutdown.

Since 2016 gas from the Cygnus A complex has been routed via a 55 km 24" export pipeline to a tie-in on the Esmond Transmission System (ETS) and then to Bacton.

== See also ==
- Bacton gas terminal
- List of oil and gas fields of the North Sea
- Esmond, Forbes and Gordon gas fields
