= Oil in place =

Total oil content of an oil reservoir

Oil in place (OIP) (not to be confused with original oil-in-place (OOIP)) is a specialist term in petroleum geology that refers to the total oil content of an oil reservoir. As this quantity cannot be measured directly, it has to be estimated from other parameters measured prior to drilling or after production has begun.

Prior to oil production from a new reservoir, volumetric methods are used to estimate oil-in-place. A series of test drills are used to map the rock conditions at and around the drilling site and to estimate the size of the oil-bearing rock field. The oil in place is calculated as the product of the volume of porous oil-bearing rock, the porosity of the rock, and its saturation. Correction factors have to be applied for the difference between the volume of the same mass of oil in the reservoir to its volume when brought to the surface, which is caused by the different physical conditions (temperature, pressure) there.

Oil-in-place is also known as stock tank original oil-in-place (STOOIP) or stock tank oil-initially-in-place (STOIIP), referring to the oil in place before the commencement of production. In this case, stock tank barrels refers to the volume of oil after production, at surface pressure and temperature (as opposed to reservoir conditions).

After production has begun, the change in reservoir pressure over time and the history of production from that reservoir can be used to estimate the total oil-in-place using the materials balance method. Alternatively, the production history can be fitted to a curve to estimate future oil production (decline curve method).

The analogous term original gas-in-place (OGIP) is used to refer to the total natural gas in a reservoir. Furthermore, there is a term called Hydrocarbons Initially in Place (HCIIP) that is used for either oil or gas. Similar to OIP, HCIIP is calculated using measures of the total reservoirs volume correcting for the non reservoir rock, the porosity and the water saturation in this pore space. Lastly the volume at reservoir conditions (high pressures and temperatures) is converted to the associated volume at surface conditions.

Oil in place must not be confused with oil reserves, that are the technically and economically recoverable portion of oil volume in the reservoir. Current recovery factors for oil fields around the world typically range between 10 and 60 percent; some are over 80 percent. The wide variance is due largely to the diversity of fluid and reservoir characteristics for different deposits.

== See also ==
- Stock tank oil
