= Cygnus gas field =

Gas field in the UK

- Country: United Kingdom
- Region: North Sea
- Location/blocks: 44/11a, 44/12a
- Offshore/onshore: Offshore
- Coordinates: 54°34’14”N 02°17’28”E
- Operator: Neptune E&P UK Ltd
- Owner: Spirit Energy (61.25 %) and Neptune Energy (38.75 %)

Field history
- Discovery: 1988
- Start of production: December 2016

Production
- Recoverable gas: 760×10^{9} cu ft (22×10^{9} m^{3})
- Producing formations: Permian sandstones, Carboniferous

The Cygnus gas field is a natural gas reservoir and gas production facilities in the UK sector of the southern North Sea. It is about 150 km of east of the Lincolnshire coast and started gas production in 2016.

== The field ==
The Cygnus field extends over UK offshore Blocks 44/11a and 44/12a. The field was discovered in 1988 by Marathon Oil. The reservoirs are Permian Leman sandstone and Carboniferous sandstone formations and have recoverable reserves of 760 billion cubic feet.

In 2019 the Cygnus gas field was jointly owned by Spirit Energy (61.25 %) and Neptune Energy (38.75 %), Neptune E&P UK Ltd operates the infrastructure.

== Development ==
Production from the field has been developed in stages. In the first stage gas was produced by wells on the Cygnus Alpha platform and then routed by pipeline to the Bacton Gas Terminal via the Esmond Transmission System. The next stage entailed development of the north west part of the field produced from the Cygnus Bravo platform which was routed 7 km to the Cygnus Alpha installation.

Details of the Cygnus field infrastructure are as shown.

Cygnus installations
Platform name	Cygnus A WHP	Cygnus A PU	Cygnus A QU	Cygnus B
Block	44/11a	44/11a	44/11a	44/12a
Installation type	Fixed Steel platform	Fixed Steel platform	Fixed Steel platform	Fixed Steel platform
Coordinates	54°36’36”N 02°22’29”E	54°34’14”N 02°17’28”E	54°34’12”N 02°17’23”E	54°35’59”N 02°11’46”E
Function	Wellheads	Processing and utilities	Accommodation and utilities	Wellheads
Crew	66			Unattended
First gas	December 2016			August 2017
Water depth, metres	22.5	22	21.7	22
Design	AMEC			
Jacket fabrication	BiFab Methil			
Jacket weight, tonnes	1,858	3,146	1,958	2,194
Topside fabrication	Heerema Hartlepool		BiFab	Heerema Hartlepool
Topsides dimensions, metres	23 x 23 x 10			
Topsides weight, tonnes	1,474	3,911	2,960	2,753
No. of legs	4	8	4	
No. of well slots	10	–	–	10
No. of Wells		–	–	
Production to	Cygnus APU across bridge	Bacton via Esmond system	–	Cygnus A PU
Production capacity		9.1×10^{6} m^{3} (320×10^{6} ft^{3}) per day	–	
Pipeline length and diameter	–	50 km, 610 mm	–	7.28 km, 324 mm (12.75 in)
Pipeline Number	–	PL3088	–	PL3086

== Production ==
Cygnus gas has a minimum Wobbe Index of 46.6 to 46.8 MJ/m^{3}. This is below the minimum specification for entry into the National Transmission System (47.2 MJ/m^{3}). Cygnus gas en route to Bacton, commingles within the ETS pipeline with gas from Trent and Tors fields. The mixed gas arrives at Bacton with a minimum Wobbe index of 46.5 to 46.7 MJ/m^{3}. If there is a reduction of gas flow from the other fields that deliver gas to Bacton then the output of Cygnus is constrained. To maintain Cygnus flow a temporary reduction of Wobbe Index from 47.2 MJ/m^{3} to 46.5 MJ/m^{3} at the NTS entry point at Bacton terminal was agreed in 2020.

== See also ==
- Bacton gas terminal
- List of oil and gas fields of the North Sea
- Esmond, Forbes and Gordon gas fields
- Tyne, Trent and Tors gas fields
