= Alwyn North oil and gas field =

Oil and gas field in the UK sector of the North Sea

- Location within North Sea
- Country: United Kingdom
- Region: North Sea
- Location/blocks: 3/9a 3/4a
- Offshore/onshore: Offshore
- Coordinates: 60.8093°N 1.6836°E
- Operators: Total Oil Marine, TotalFinaElf
- Owner: Elf Exploration UK and Total Oil Marine; TotalFinaElf

Field history
- Start of production: 1987
- Peak of production: 4.36 million tonnes per year
- Peak year: 1989

Production
- Recoverable oil: 200 million barrels (~2.7×10^{7} t)
- Recoverable gas: 27×10^{9} m^{3} (950×10^{9} cu ft)
- Producing formations: Jurassic sandstone

Alwyn North is a major oil and gas field in the United Kingdom sector of the northern North Sea, 160 km east of the Shetland Islands. The field was developed through two bridge-linked offshore platforms and a number of subsea satellite wellheads. Alwyn North has been producing oil and gas since 1987 and is still (2023) in operation.

== The field ==
The field was discovered in June 1975 principally in Block 3/9a of the northern North Sea with a small extension into Block 3/4a. The reservoir is a Jurassic sandstone, comprising a Brent (oil) formation at a depth of 3,100 m and a Statfjord (gas) formation at 3,400 m. The estimated recoverable oil is 200 million barrels and recoverable gas is 27 billion cubic metres. The oil has an API gravity of 39° and a sulfur content of 0.5%. The name Alwyn has Scottish connotations and can be easily pronounced in English and French – the French operator Is Total.

== Development ==
The Alwyn North field was developed by a joint venture comprising Elf Exploration UK plc (66.66 %) and Total Oil Marine plc (33.33%). The field was initially developed by two bridge-linked offshore platforms: the drilling platform NAA and a production platform NAB. Key parameters of the platforms are:

Key parameters of the NAA and NAB platforms
| Platform | NAA | NAB |
| Type | Steel jacket self-buoyant launch | Steel jacket self-buoyant launch |
| Function | Drilling & accommodation | Processing |
| Topsides design | Foster Wheeler Ltd | McDermott Engineering |
| Fabrication yard | RGC Methil/UIE Clydebank | RGC Methil/UIE Clydebank |
| Legs | 8 | 8 |
| Piles | 32 | 24 |
| Operating topsides weight | 21,000 tonnes | 17,500 tonnes |
| Well slots | 40 | – |
| Jacket installation | Summer 1985 | Summer 1986 |
| Coordinates | 60.809278N 1.683611E | 60.810117N 1.743450E |
| Water depth | 126 m | 126 m |
| Topsides installation | 1985/6 | Early 1987 |
| Start up | Autumn 1986 (drilling) | Autumn 1987 (production) |

=== Oil and gas processing ===
The process plant has an oil treatment capacity of 99,000 stock tank barrels per day and a gas handling capacity of 9 million cubic metres per day. Oil from the NAA oil wells is routed across the bridge to the oil separator, where vapour and water are removed, oil then flows to the oil dehydrator where more water is removed and through the export pumps to the Ninian Central installation via a 16 km 12-inch pipeline, and from there to the Sullom Voe terminal. Gas from the gas wellheads flows to the gas condensate separator and is then comingled with compressed off-gas from the oil plant. The combined flow is then routed to the glycol-based gas dehydration system to reduce the water dewpoint. Gas is then refrigerated using Freon to remove liquids, gas flows to Frigg TP1 installation via a 112 km 24-inch gas export line. Liquids removed in the gas plant are routed to the inlet of the oil separator.

Produced water from the oil train separators is treated to remove oil prior to overboard discharge. The oily water system has a capacity of 100,000 barrels per day.

Filtered and deoxygenated seawater is injected into the reservoir to assist with production, the plant is designed to treat and inject 130,000 barrels of water per day.

The peak oil production was 4.36 million tonnes per year in 1989; the peak gas production was 2.8 billion m^{3} (in 1989).

Gas injection commenced in late 1999 into the Brent East-South area then from September 2000 into the Brent North West area. By mid 2002 1.68 Gsm^{3} of gas had been injected. This increased oil production in four wells between a 2 to 10 fold.

=== Satellite fields ===
The subsea wellheads from the Nuggets (Northern Underwater Gas Gathering Export and Treatment System), Forvie, Islay and Jura fields are routed to Alwyn North for fluid processing.

Alwyn North satellite fields
| Name | Forvie | Islay | Jura | Nuggets |
| Owner | Total | Total | Total | |
| Block | 3/15 | 3/15 | 3/15 | 3/18c, 3/19a, 3/19b, 3/20a |
| Reservoir fluids | Condensate | HT HP gas | Gas | Gas |
| Discovered | 2002 | 2008 | November 2006 | 1973 |
| Reserves | | 17 million barrels oil equivalent | 30 million barrels oil equivalent | 500 billion cubic feet |
| Wells | | 1 | 2 | 5 |
| Export | Alwyn N | Alwyn N | Forvie N manifold | Alwyn N |
| First oil/gas | 2006 | 2012 | 2008 | 2003 |
| Water depth | 120 m | 112 m | 113 m | 120 m |
