= Esmond, Forbes and Gordon gas fields =

Depleted natural gas fields in the North Sea

Esmond gas field
- Location within the United Kingdom
- Country: United Kingdom
- Region: North Sea
- Location/blocks: 43/13a
- Offshore/onshore: Offshore
- Coordinates: 54°36′18″N 1°25′36″E
- Operator: Hamilton Brothers
- Owner: see text
- Service contractors: see text

Field history
- Discovery: June 1982
- Start of production: 1985
- Peak of production: 1.2 billion cubic metres per year
- Abandonment: 1995

Production
- Producing formations: sandstone

Esmond, Forbes and Gordon are three adjacent, now depleted, natural gas fields in the southern North Sea, 170 km east of Teesside.

== The fields ==
Esmond, Forbes and Gordon were the most northerly gas fields in the UK sector of the southern North Sea: Esmond was in Block 43/13a, Forbes in Block 43/8a and Gordon in Blocks 43/15a and 43/20a. The fields were named after Scottish clans.

The gas reservoirs are Lower Triassic Bunter sandstones at a depth of 4,470 to 5,755 feet (1,362 to 1,754 metres). The reservoir properties are:

Esmond, Forbes and Gordon reservoir properties
Parameter	Esmond	Forbes	Gordon
Discovered	June 1982	January 1970	June 1969
Thickness, feet	342	187	440
Porocity, %	23-4	15-25	14-21
Water saturation, %	16.8	15.9	22.1
Gas water contact, feet	4,470	5,744	5,450
Temperature, °F	135	146	142
Pressure at depth, pounds force per square inch @ feet	2,280 @ 4,600	2,800 @ 5,700	2,622 @ 5,300
Volume factor, standard cubic feet/reservoir cubic feet	158	179	165
Composition methane, %	91	86	82
Composition nitrogen, %	8	12	16
Gas in place, billion cubic feet (1985)	381	104	185
Recoverable reserves, billion cubic metres (1994)	9.1	1.5	3.9

== Owner and operator ==
In 1985 the licensees were Hamilton Oil GB plc (48%), Hamilton Bros Petroleum (UK) Ltd (12%), RTZ Oil and Gas Ltd (25%), Blackfriars Oil Co Ltd (12.5&), and Trans-European Co. Ltd (2.5%). The operator was Hamilton Brothers Oil & Gas Ltd. Hamilton Bros remained the operator until BHP assumed operatorship prior to decommissioning in 1995.

== Development ==
The three fields were individually uneconomic to develop. However, the development was viable if they were developed together. They were configured as a central processing complex (Esmond) and two unmanned satellites, Forbes and Gordon.

Esmond, Forbes and Gordon platform parameters and features
Platform	Esmond CP	Esmond CW	Forbes AW	Gordon BW
Type	Steel jacket	Steel jacket	Steel jacket	Steel jacket
Coordinates	54°36’18”N 01°25’36”E			
Function	Processing and accommodation	Wellheads	Satellite drilling and production	Satellite drilling and production
Water depth, metres	31	31	23	17
Jacket fabrication	McDermott, Ardesier	Lewis Offshore, Stornoway	McDermott, Ardesier	McDermott, Ardesier
Jacket weight, tonnes	1,912	1,049	991	857
Topsides fabrication	McDermott, Ardesier	Lewis Offshore, Stornoway	Wm Press, Wallsend	Wm Press, Wallsend
Topsides weight, tonnes	5,960	543	2,163	2,163
Legs	8	4	4	4
Piles	16	8	6	6
Well slots	None	12 (7 wells planned)	9 (2 planned)	9 (2 planned)
Production capacity, million standard cubic feet per day	200 MMSCFD (334 MMSCFD winter peak)	–		
Jacket installation	September 1984	July 1984	1984	1984
Topsides installation	April 1985		Spring 1985	Spring 1985
Start up	June 1985	June 1985	August-October 1985	August-October 1985
Accommodation	51	Nil	4–6 (emergency)	4–6 (emergency)
Production to:	Bacton gas terminal by pipeline	CP via bridge	CP by pipeline	CP by pipeline
Pipeline, length and diameter	204 km 24-inch	–	11.5 km 10-inch	35 km 12-inch

== Production ==
Processing facilities on Esmond comprised gas/condensate/water separation, Tri-ethylene glycol (TEG) dehydration, and provision for 20,000 bhp of gas compression. Condensate was injected into the gas export line.

Peak production from the three fields was:

- Esmond 1.2 billion cubic metres per year (bcmy) (1986)
- Forbes 0.5 bcmy (1986)
- Gordon 0.4 bcmy (1986)

By 1995 Esmond had produced around 8.5 billion standard cubic metres. That was about 93% of the recoverable reserves in the reservoir.

== Later developments ==
Decommissioning was approved in 1993-5; the Forbes platform was recovered to shore in 1993, the Esmond and Gordon installations were taken to a yard in the Netherlands for dismantling in 1995.

The 24-inch Esmond to Bacton pipeline was known as the Esmond Transmission System (ETS). Following decommissioning of Esmond in 1995 the pipeline was reconfigured and reused to transport gas from Tyne and Trent fed by a 20-inch pipeline. The 37 km northerly part of the ETS was disconnected. The remainder was renamed EAGLES East Anglia Gas And Liquids Evacuation System Pipeline. Tyne production ceased in 2015. The Cygnus gas field has used the pipeline since 2016.

There are proposals to use the Esmond reservoir for carbon dioxide storage.
