= Argyll oil field =

North sea well

- Location within North Sea
- Country: United Kingdom
- Region: North Sea
- Location/blocks: 30/24 and 30/25
- Offshore/onshore: Offshore
- Coordinates: 56°10′40″N 2°46′47″E
- Operators: see text
- Owner: see text

Field history
- Discovery: August 1971
- Start of production: July 1975
- Abandonment: 1992, 2005, 2020

The Argyll oil field is a depleted crude oil field in the UK sector of the central North Sea, 310 km east-south-east of Aberdeen. It was the first field to produce crude oil from the UK offshore continental shelf. Oil was produced between 1975 and 2020 through a series of floating and jack-up production installations. In later phases of development the field was known as Ardmore and then Alma. The adjacent Duncan (later Galia) and Innes fields also processed oil through the Argyll/Ardmore/Alma installation. Oil production from the field has now (2021) ceased.

== The field ==
The Argyll oil field is located in Blocks 30/24 and 30/25 of the UK North Sea continental shelf. The field was discovered in August 1971; the oil reservoir comprises Zechstein dolomite with an underlying Rotliegendes sandstone and a Jurassic sandstone at a depth of 8,733 – 9,373 feet (2,662–2,857 metres). The geology of the Duncan field (discovered in 1980) is similar to Argyll comprising two Jurassic reservoirs. The reservoirs and their fluids have the following characteristics:

Argyll and Duncan reservoirs and fluids
Field	Argyll		Duncan
Producing horizon	Zechstein	Rotliegendes	Jurassic
API gravity	38°API	34°API	
Gas Oil Ratio, standard cubic feet per barrel	210	110	
Wax content	6%		
Sulfur	0.2%		
Initial recoverable reserves, barrels	65 million		20 million

== Owners and operators ==
The joint venture owners of the Argyll and Duncan fields in 1985 were Hamilton Brothers Oil Co (28.8%), Hamilton Brothers Petroleum (7.2%), RTZ Oil & Gas Ltd (25%), Blackfriars Oil Co Ltd (12.5%), Trans-European Co Ltd (2.5%), Texaco North Sea (UK) Ltd (24%).

Tuscan Energy and Acorn Oil and Gas were the owners and operators of Ardmore between 2002 and 2005.

EnQuest was the owner and operator of Alma and Galia between 2012 and 2020.

== Argyll development ==
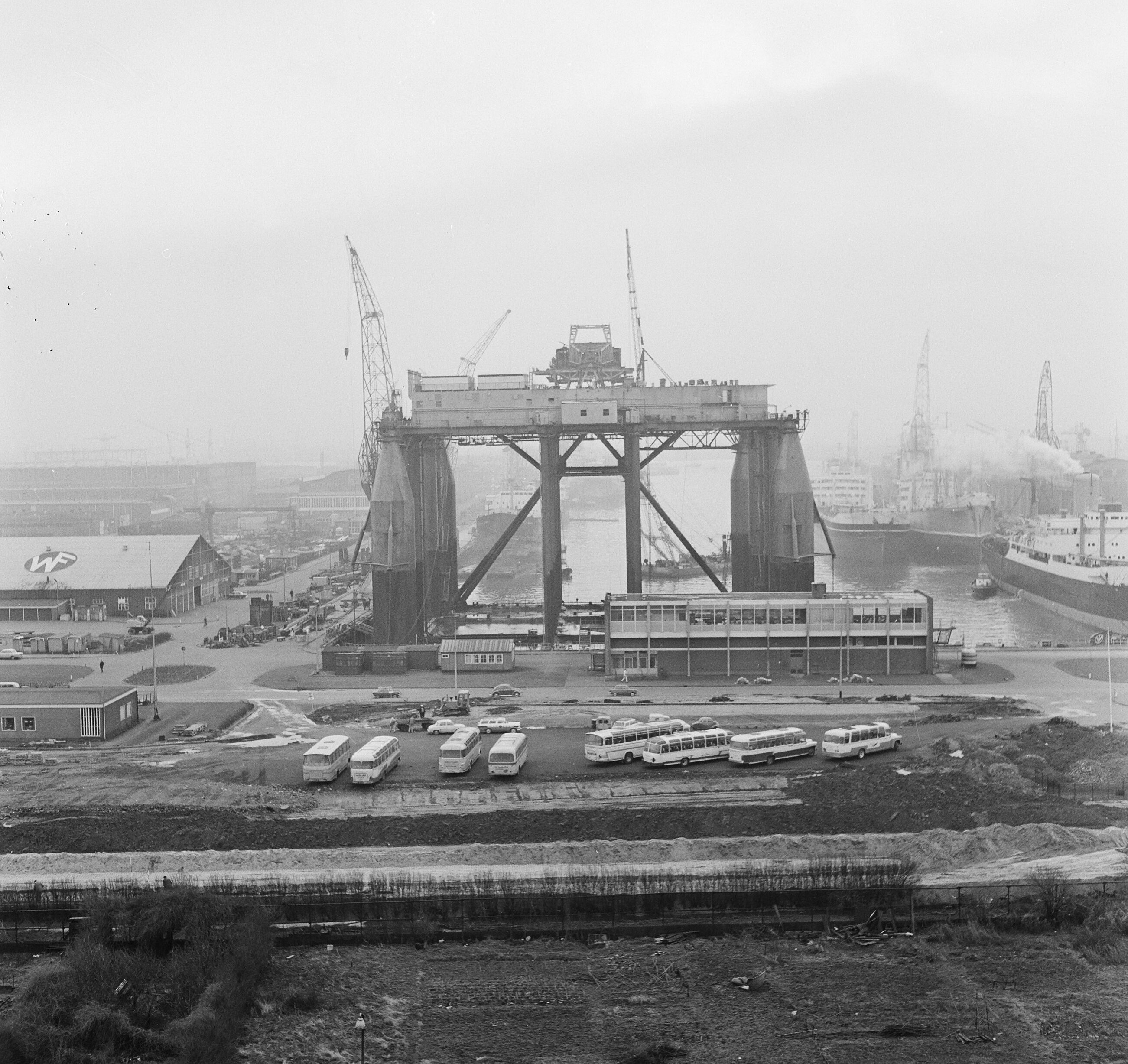
Transworld 58 oil rig under construction by Wilton-Fijenoord

The Argyll field was initially developed by Hamilton Brothers using a converted semisubmersible production and accommodation vessel (Transworld 58). In 1984 the Transworld 58 was moved to the nearby Innes field. And its place at Argyll was taken by the Deepsea Pioneer. The principal design data of these vessels was as follows.

Argyll installations design data
Vessel	Transworld 58	Deepsea Pioneer
Coordinates	56°10’40”N 02°46’47”E	
Water depth	79 m	
Type	Converted semisubmersible	Converted semisubmersible
Function	Production and accommodation	Production and accommodation
Crew		100
Rig conversion	Hamilton Bros. William Walton, Middlesbrough	Peterhead Engineering, Invergordon
Topsides design	Bechtel International	Bechtel (GB) Ltd
Oil throughput	25,000 bopd	70,000 bopd
Water injection	Nil	60,000 bwpd
Wells	8	16
Anchoring		8 point plus thrusters
Installation	February 1975	November 1984
Production start-up	June 1975	November 1984
Oil production to	Catenary Anchor Leg Mooring via a 7,500 feet 10-inch flowline	
Gas production to	On board fuel gas, excess flared	

Oil from the field was exported through the Catenary Anchor Leg Mooring facility. This was located 2.29 km from the Argyll installation at 56°10’27”N 02°49’03”E in a water depth of 77 metres. It was connected via a 7,500 feet (2,286 m) 10-inch diameter flowline from Argyll. It was capable of operating with vessels up to 100,000 dead weight tons. The first oil from the field was loaded into the tanker Theogennitor and offloaded at the BP refinery at the Isle of Grain Kent.

Initial production from Argyll (in 1000s barrels)

The production from Duncan began in February 1982 and it produced 1.22 million bbl (194 thousand m^{3}) in 1983 and 3.30 million bbl (525 thousand m^{3}) in 1984.

Production from Innes was routed to Argyll via an 11 km 6-inch flowline.

When Argyll was shut-in in November 1992 it had produced more than 73 million bbl (11.6 million m^{3}). Duncan was shut down in October 1992, by which time it had produced 18.7 million bbl (2.97 million m^{3}) from a Stock Tank oil initially in place (STBIIP) of 47.7 STBIIP.

The Argyll, Duncan and Innes fields Argyll was shut-in in November 1992, all the wells were plugged and the facilities were removed.

== Ardmore development ==
Tuscan Energy and Acorn Oil and Gas assumed ownership of the field in 2002. They renamed the field Ardmore and redeveloped it with the Rowan Gorilla VII mobile drilling and production jack-up unit. Production from Ardmore began in October 2003.

The process plant was designed to process 40,000 bpd of oil. It comprised two stages of 3-phase (oil, water and gas) separation. Oil from the 2nd Stage Separator was cooled and sent to storage. Gas from the 1st Stage Separator was used as fuel gas and the excess was flared together with gas from the 2nd stage separator. Produced water from the 1st Stage Separator was treated in hydrocyclones to remove oil which was returned to the 2nd Stage Separator. Water from the hydrocyclones flowed to the Water Degassing Vessel before overboard discharge. Water from the 2nd Stage Separator was recycled to the 1st Stage Separator. Oil was sent to two single anchor leg mooring buoys located 1.5 km from Ardmore and was loaded into the two shuttle tankers.

Tuscan Energy and Acorn Oil and Gas produced 5.2 million bbl (830 thousand m^{3}) between October 2003 and June 2005.

After Ardmore ceased production in June 2005 the wells were plugged and the jack-up and loading facilities were removed from the field.

== Alma and Galia development ==
EnQuest assumed ownership of the field in 2010. It renamed the Argyll/Ardmore field Alma and the Duncan field as Galia. Both of the fields were redeveloped as a joint facility based on the EnQuest Producer (formerly Uisge Gorm) Floating Production, Storage and Offloading (FPSO) vessel. The processing capability was:

Alma Galia processing capacity
Processing Facility	Capacity
Crude oil processing	57,000 bbls/day
Crude oil storage	625,000 bbls
Gas compression	1.7 million cubic feet (48,000 m^{3}) per day
Produced water	94,000 bbls/day
Produced water injection	90,000 bbls/day at 175 bar
Seawater injection	70,000 bbls/day at 175 bar

The water cut when the Ardmore field was closed in 2005 was 70%. EnQuest intended to redevelop the field up to 95% water cut. Six electric submersible pumps aided production. The process plant comprised two first stage separators, an interstage heater and a single second stage separator. From the latter oil flowed to the electrostatic dehydrator prior to cooling and transfer to the vessel's storage tanks. Produced water was treated in hydrocyclones prior to overboard discharge. Gas was used as fuel gas and excess was flared.

When EnQuest ceased production in June 2020 the wells were plugged and facilities removed.
