= Stock tank oil =

Stock tank oil is the volume of oil after flashing to nominal atmospheric (or other stated) storage pressure and temperature (as opposed to reservoir conditions).

== Background ==
Crude oil is a complex mixture of many individual compounds which influence the physical properties of the oil, such as its density (API gravity), viscosity, Permeability, Dew point, Formation Volume, etc.. The properties also influence how the oil is classified and its value.

The quantity of oil originally in place in a reservoir is usually expressed as Stock Tank Oil Originally In Place (STOOIP), this is usually given in millions of stock tank barrels (MMstb).

== Processing ==
Crude oil from subterranean reservoirs is usually produced with associated gas, produced water and solids such as sand. The crude oil must be stabilised to prevent excessive gassing during storage and to remove water and solids. Stabilisation involves passing the wellhead fluids through one, two, or three stages of separation operating at successively lower pressure to flash off lighter hydrocarbons and to remove water and solids. For a three stage train the operating pressures of the high, intermediate and low pressure separators might typically be:

- HP separator: 1200 psig
- IP separator: 200 psig
- LP separator: 50 psig
- Stock tank: 2 psig

The vapor pressure and relative volatility of constituent compounds is:

Component	Vapor pressure at 100 °F, psia	Relative volatitity
C1 (methane)	5000	96.9
C2 (ethane)	800	15.5
C3	190	3.68
iC4	72.2	1.40
nC4	51.6	1.00
iC5	20.4	0.40
nC5	15.6	0.30
C6	5.0	0.10
C7+	0.1	0.00
CO_{2}	-	infinite
N_{2}	-	infinite
H_{2}S	394	7.64

Alternatively, plant may be arranged with each stage operating at successively higher temperature.

The product is dead crude which is stored in stock tanks operating at just above atmospheric pressure. Offshore production also produces a dead crude but is often spiked with natural gas liquids (NGL) as a convenient transport route for these liquids. This is known as live crude. The NGL is flashed off and recovered in the onshore separation plant. The operating pressure and temperature of the separation plant may be specified such that the oil meets a required vapor pressure, such as Reid Vapor Pressure.

== Properties ==
Density and viscosity are important property inputs into correlations for pipe-flow calculations. Stack Tank Oil (STO) density (or API) may also be used by regulatory bodies to classify oil and oil products. Other properties such as Molecular Weight, saturated aromatic resin and asphaltene (SARA), refractive index, wax appearance temperature, asphaltene precipitation, and acid number, are also specified at Stock Tank conditions. Typically stock tank conditions are 14.7 psia and 60 °F (101,325 Pa and 16 °C).Flowrates of oil are commonly specified at Stock Tank conditions, e.g: Stock Tank barrels of oil per day STBOPD.

== See also ==
- Oil in place
