= Sean gas field =

UK gas field in the North Sea

- Country: United Kingdom
- Region: North Sea
- Block: 49/25
- Offshore/onshore: Offshore
- Operators: Shell 1986-2015. ONE 2015-
- Owner: Shell 1969-2015, ONE 2015-

Field history
- Discovery: 1969
- Start of production: 1986

Production
- Current production of gas: 600×10^{6} cu ft/d (17×10^{6} m^{3}/d)
- Estimated gas in place: 16.4×10^{9} m^{3} (580×10^{9} cu ft)
- Producing formations: Rotliegendes sandstone

The Sean gas field is a small natural gas and associated condensate field located in the UK sector of the North Sea, 67 miles (108 km) off the Norfolk coast.

== The field ==
The Sean gas field is a natural gas field located in the North Sea and comprises three accumulations North Sean, South Sean and East Sean. The field 67 miles (108 km) north-east of Bacton Norfolk and is located to the south east of the Indefatigable gas field. It is named after the four partners at the time of its discovery: Shell, Esso, Allied Chemical and National Coal Board. The gas reservoir is a Rotliegendes sandstone 170–290 feet (52–88 metres) thick at a depth of 8,300 feet (2,530 m). North Sean was discovered in April 1969 and South Sean in January 1970 both are located in UK Block 49/25. The original determination of the gas in place amounted to 425 billion cubic feet (12.4 billion cubic metres).

== Development ==
The Sean field has been developed through a number of offshore platforms.

Sean installations
Platform	Field	Function	Type	Legs	Well slots	Installed	Production start	Production to
Sean PP	South Sean	Production & accommodation	Steel jacket	8	–	May and November 1985	October 1986	Bacton (via 30-inch 107 km pipeline)
Sean PD	South Sean	Drilling and wellhead	Steel jacket	6	12	January and November 1985	October 1986	Sean PP (bridge link)
Sean PK	South Sean	Compression	Steel jacket			Planned future, never installed		Sean PP (bridge link)
Sean RD	North Sean	Satellite wellhead	Steel jacket	6	12	January and November 1985	October 1986	Sean PP (via 20-inch 4.7 km pipeline)

The East Sean field has not been developed.

== Production ==
Production from the field began in August 1986. Sean was operated as a peak shaving field with a maximum delivery of 600 MMSCFD (million standard cubic feet per day). Processing facilities comprise 3-phase separation and gas dehydration. Gas and associated condensate are transported via a 30-inch diameter pipeline to the Shell processing facility at the Bacton gas terminal, Norfolk.

The specification of third party gas for entry into the export gas pipeline was as follows:

Parameter	Value
Gross calorific value	37–44.5 MJ/Sm^{3}
Oxygen	<0.2%
CO_{2}	2 mol % maximum
H_{2}S	<3.3 ppm
Total sulfur	<15 ppm
Wobbe Index	48–51.5 MJ/Sm^{3}
Inerts	<7%
Nitrogen	<5%

In June 2015 Oranje-Nassau Energie (ONE) acquired a 50% interest in the Sean field from Shell. SSE E&P UK holds the remaining 50% interest. ONE became the operator of Sean.

== See also ==
- Indefatigable gas field
