= Maureen oil field =

UK oilfield in the North Sea

- Location within North Sea
- Country: United Kingdom
- Region: Central North Sea
- Location/block: 16/29a
- Offshore/onshore: Offshore
- Coordinates: 58°01′52″N 01°42′06″E
- Operator: Phillips Petroleum
- Owner: Phillips Petroleum Company UK Ltd (33.78%), Fina Exploration Ltd (28.96%), AGIP UK Ltd (17.26%), Century Power & Light Ltd (11.5%), and Ultramar Exploration Ltd (8.5%).

Field history
- Discovery: February 1973
- Start of production: 14 September 1983
- Abandonment: October 1999

Production
- Current production of oil: 70,000 barrels per day (~3.4×10^{6} t/a)
- Recoverable oil (million tonnes): 20
- Producing formations: Paleocene sandstone

The Maureen oil field is a partially depleted crude oil field in the UK sector of the central North Sea, 262 km north-east of Aberdeen. Oil was produced from the field reservoir by the Maureen A platform between 1983 and 1999. Proposals to further exploit the residual hydrocarbons in the field have yet to be implemented.

== The field ==
The Maureen oil field is located in Block 16/29a of the UK North Sea continental shelf. The Maureen field was discovered in February 1973; the oil reservoir comprises a Paleocene sandstone at a depth of 8,300 to 9,000 feet (2,530 to 2,743 metres). The reservoir and its fluids have the following characteristics:

Maureen reservoir and fluids
Parameter	Value
API gravity	35.6°API
Gas Oil Ratio	500 standard cubic feet/barrel
Sulfur content	Nil
Initial recoverable reserves	125–150 million barrels, 28 million tonnes

Near Maureen are three small fields, Morag, Moira and Mary which were produced through the Maureen facilities.

== Owners and operators ==
The owners of the field in 1985 were Phillips Petroleum Company UK Ltd (33.78%), Fina Exploration Ltd (28.96%), AGIP UK Ltd (17.26%), Century Power & Light Ltd (11.5%), and Ultramar Exploration Ltd (8.5%). Phillips operated the Maureen field.

== Development ==
The Maureen field was developed by a single integrated drilling, production and accommodation platform. The principal design data of the Maureen A platform is given in the table.

Maureen platform design data
Coordinates	58°01’52”N 01°42’06”E
Water depth, metres	95.6
Fabrication of jacket	Ayreshire Marine Construction, Hunterston
Jacket weight, tonnes	42,750 unballasted, 92,750 ballasted
Storage tanks	3 off: 67 m tall x 26 m diameter
Topsides design	Worley Engineering
Topsides weight, tonnes	19,000
Function	Drilling, production, storage, accommodation
Accommodation (crew)	150
Type	Steel gravity base (Tecnomare design)
Well slots	24 (12 production, 7 water injection)
Throughput oil, barrels per day (bpd)	80,000
Storage, bbl	650,000
Water injection, bpd	90,000
Platform installed	June 1983
Production started	14 September 1983
Oil production to	Storage tanks then the articulated loading column, through a 2.3 km 24-inch pipeline
Gas production to	Fuel gas, surplus flared

The installation was the first steel gravity base platform deployed in the North Sea. It was the largest steel structure in the North Sea when it was decommissioned in 2001.

== Processing ==
Oil from the wellheads was routed to 3-phase (oil, gas, water) separators where gas and water were removed. Oil was treated to remove salt and was cooled, metered and pumped into the installation’s storage tanks. When required the oil was pumped to the Articulated Loading Column for tanker loading. The tanker loading rate was 20,000 bbl/hour. Peak production of oil was 70,000 bpd in 1984. Gas from the separators was compressed in one of two trains each with four stage compressors. Gas in excess of that required for fuel gas and gas lift was exported to Fulmar A and then to the St. Fergus terminal.

Water injection plant includes deaeration and fine filtration equipment; water is injected into the reservoir at up to 90,000 barrels per day.

Morag field was discovered in 1979, it came onstream in 1981 and produced 2.6 million barrels prior to shutdown in 1994. Mary was discovered in 1991, it came on stream in 1991 and produced 2.83 million barrels before being shut down in June 1999. Moira was discovered in 1988 and was developed as a single deviated well tied back to Maureen; It flowed at 5100 bpd and produced 4.2 million barrels before it was shut-in in 1999.

== Decommissioning ==
The Maureen field became uneconomic in 1999 having produced 217.4 million barrels in 16 years; it was shut down in October 1999. The estimated STOIIP was 397 million barrels.

In June 2001 the Maureen installation was lifted off the seabed by injecting water under the three bases and deballasting water from the tanks. Once afloat six tugs towed the platform 165 nautical miles to Stord Island in Norway and broke up the structure for recycling.

Proposals have been put forward to further exploit the residual hydrocarbons in the field. None have been implemented.
