= Njord oil field =

Norwegian oil and natural gas field

Coordinates: 64°16′15″N 7°12′02″E

Njord
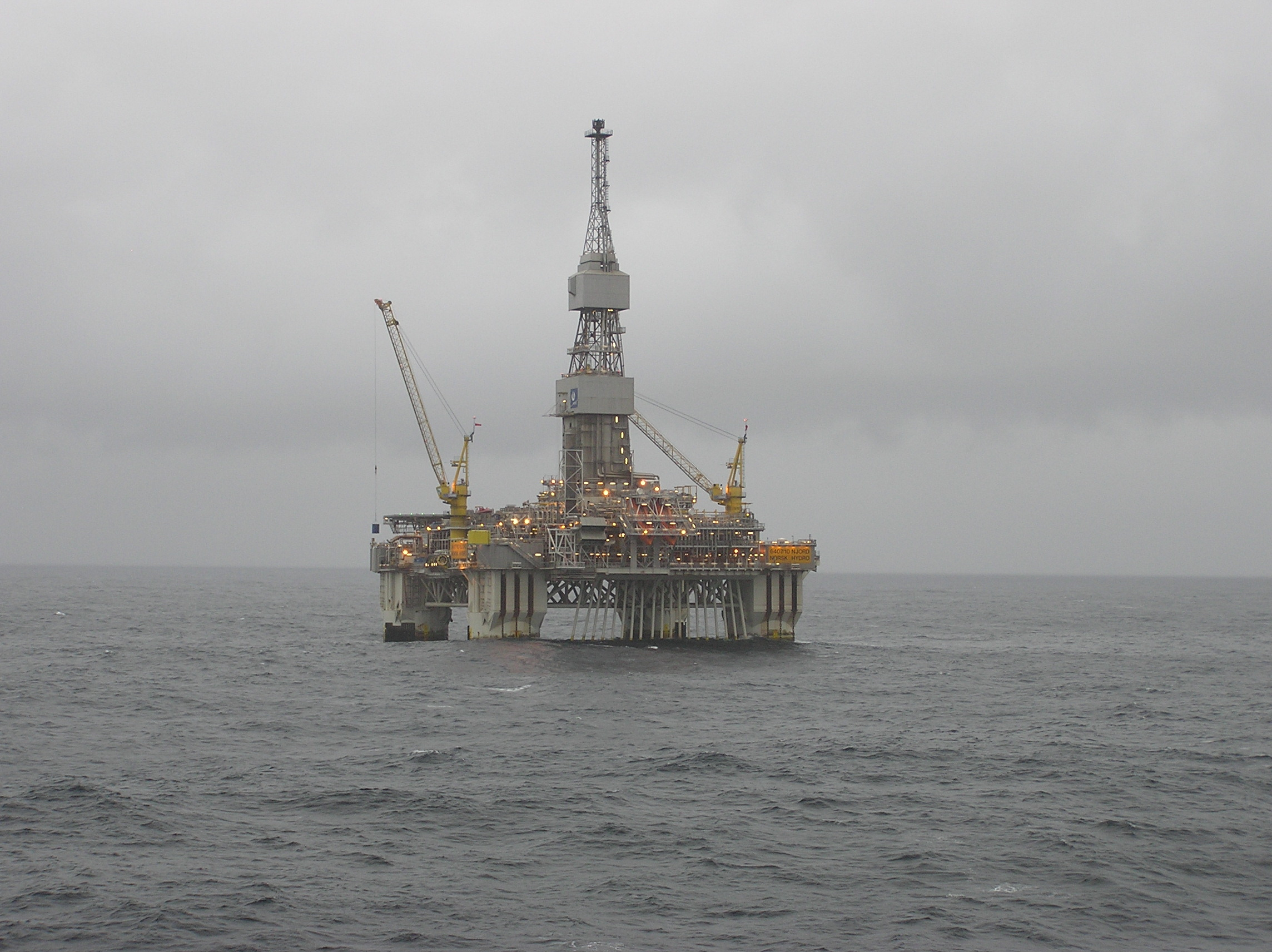
- Country: Norway
- Region: Norwegian Sea
- Blocks: 6407/7 and 6407/10
- Offshore/onshore: Offshore
- Operators: Equinor
- Partners: Wintershall Dea Norge AS (50%), Equinor Energy AS (27.5%) and Neptune Energy Norge AS (22.5%)

Field history
- Discovery: 1986
- Start of production: 30 September 1997

Production
- Producing formations: Tilje and Ile Formations

The Njord oil field (Njord – petroleumsfelt) is an oil field 30 kilometres (19 mi) west of the Draugen field, in the Norwegian Sea. The field lies around 130 kilometres (81 mi) northwest of Kristiansund Municipality, Norway. Although the field was discovered in 1986, production did not begin until 1997. Operation facilities at the field consist of Njord A, a floating steel platform unit, containing drilling and processing facilities (along with living quarters), and Njord Bravo, a storage vessel.

Ownership of the field is divided between Wintershall Dea Norge AS (50%), Equinor Energy AS (27.5%) and Neptune Energy Norge AS (22.5%). Between 2016 and 2020, the field is being shut down to allow for upgrades to the facilities. This aims to make the field ready to produce until 2040. The contract for upgrading Njord A, (worth NOK 5 billion) was awarded to Kværner.

Remaining reserves are roughly 20 million barrels of oil and 9 BCM natural gas.
