= Nelson oil and gas field =

UK oil field in the North Sea

The Nelson oil and gas field is a significant crude oil and gas producing field in the UK sector of the North Sea, 200 km east-north-east of Aberdeen. The field was discovered in March 1988 and production of oil and gas started in February 1994.

== The field ==
The Nelson field is located in Block 22/6a of the UK North Sea. It is named after Admiral Viscount Horatio Nelson whose statue is in Trafalgar Square where Enterprise Oil's office was located. Two other fields are tied back to the Nelson field platform: Bardolino oil field Block 22/13 (57.6404°N, 1.3700°E) and Howe oil field Block 22/12a (57.7040°N, 1.4058°E).

The Nelson field oil has an API gravity of 40 degrees, a gas/oil ratio of 555 scf/bbl, and a sulfur content is 0.23%. Recoverable reserves originally present were estimated to be 56.70 million tonnes.

== Owners and operators ==
The original company interests were Esso Exploration and Production UK Ltd 50% and Shell UK Ltd 50.0%. Shell were the operator for the design, construction and installation phases. Enterprise Oil are the operator for the drilling and operation phases.

== Development ==
The field was developed by a single manned drilling and production platform (located at 57.6629°N, 1.1456°E). The platform has 36 well slots. The water depth is 87 metres. In addition, the southern subsea satellite comprises a cluster of four subsea producer wells. The jacket weighs 8500 tonnes, and the topsides 9900 tonnes.

The Howe subsea satellite was installed in 2004 comprises two producer wells tied back to the Nelson platform via a 14 km 8-inch diameter pipeline. Lift gas is routed to the Howe satellite via a 3-inch pipeline.

The Bardolino subsea satellite was installed in 2010 comprises one producing well.

== Processing ==
The Nelson platform's processing capacity is summarised in the following table.

Nelson processing capability
Facility	Capacity
Separation	1 single stage gravity separator plus coalescer
Gas treatment	3 stage compression, glycol contactor dehydration
Oil export capacity	145,000 bbl/d (barrels per day)
Gas compression	122 mmscf/d (million standard cubic feet per day)
Gas export	59 mmscf/d
Gas import	20 mmscf/d
Gas lift	116 mmscf/d
Gas dehydration	122 mmscf/d
H_{2}S removal	0.0378 m^{3}/h (H_{2}S scavenger)
Produced water	170,000 bbl/d
Water injection	170,000 bbl/d
Oil export route	Forties production system to Cruden Bay
Gas export route	Fulmar gas pipeline to St Fergus

== Production ==
The first year of peak production was 1995 when Nelson produced 6.60 million tonnes of oil and NGL.

The expected end of production is about 2040.
