= Heather oil field =

Crude oil field in the UK

- Location within North Sea
- Country: United Kingdom
- Region: northern North Sea
- Location/block: 2/5
- Offshore/onshore: Offshore
- Coordinates: 60°57′13″N 00°56′23″E
- Operators: Unionoil, Unocal, DNO, Lundin, Enquest
- Owner: See text

Field history
- Discovery: 1973
- Start of production: 1978
- Peak of production: 1982

Production
- Recoverable oil (million tonnes): 14.1
- Producing formations: Jurassic sandstone

The Heather oil field is a significant crude oil producing field in the UK sector of the northern North Sea, 458 km north-north-east of Aberdeen. Production of oil started in 1978 and ceased in 2019. The Heather Alpha installation is currently (2021) undergoing decommissioning.

== The field ==
The Heather oil field is located in Block 2/5 of the UK North Sea. It is named after the plant that grows extensively on Scottish moors. The Heather field was discovered in December 1973 and comprises a middle Jurassic sandstone at a depth of 9,800 to 11,750 feet (2,9873 to 3,581 m). The reservoir and its fluids had the following characteristics:

Heather reservoir fluids
Parameter	Value
Porosity	1.7-19.3 %
Water saturation	21.4-56.3 %
API gravity	35°API
Gas Oil Ratio	650 standard cubic feet/barrel
Sulfur content	0.7 %
Recoverable reserves	90-120 million barrels, 14.1 million tonnes

== Owners and operators ==
The initial owners of the field were a consortium comprising Unionoil Company of Great Britain (31.25%), Texaco North Sea UK Ltd (31.25%), Tenneco Great Britain Ltd (31.25%), and DNO (UK) Ltd. (6.25%). The field was operated by Unionoil Company of Great Britain. In 1994 the owners were BG Great Britain Limited (31.25%), Texaco Exploration Ltd (31.25%), Unocal Britain Ltd (31.25%), and DNO (Heather Oilfield) Ltd (6.25%). The operator was Unocal. In 1999 DNO became the operator, then Lundin from 2008, and finally Enquest.

== Development ==
The field was developed by a single integrated drilling, production and accommodation platform: Heather Alpha (Heather A). The principal design data of the Heather A platform is given in the following table.

Heather A platform design
Installation	Heather A
Coordinates	60°57’13”N 00°56’23”E
Water depth, metres	143
Fabrication substructure	McDermott, Ardersier
Topsides design	McDermott
Topside weight, tonnes	22,000
Function	Drilling, production, accommodation
Accommodation (crew)	180
Type	Steel jacket
Legs	8
Piles	24
Well slots	40
Throughput oil, barrels per day (bpd)	60,000
Water injection, bpd	100,000
Platform installed	June 1977
Production start	October 1978
Oil production to	Ninian Central
Gas production to	Used onboard for gas lift and fuel gas

=== Processing ===
The wellhead fluids flowed via the production manifold to the 3-phase Production Separator which operated at 65 psi (448 kPa). From the Separator oil was routed to another 3-phase Production Separator operating at a lower pressure of 35 psi (241 kPa). Oil then flowed to the crude booster pumps, through oil metering then by 32 km 16-inch pipeline to Ninian Central and thence to Sullom Voe. Produced water from the separators was treated by hydrocylones and a compact flotation unit (CFU) to remove oil prior to overboard discharge. Vapour from the Production Separators was compressed, dried by TEG (triethylene glycol) and further compressed to 325 psi (2,241 kPa) for use as fuel gas and up to 1,480 psi (10,204 kPa) for gas lift. In 1985 a connection was made to the Western leg gas pipeline, a 6-inch pipeline imported gas into Heather to augment gas supplies. Import gas flowed to an Import Gas Knockout Drum, through metering and to an Import Gas Heater.

Oil production profile for Heather A (in 1000s barrels per year)
in the early operating period

The fluid handling capability of the Heather facilities in its latter years was as follows:

Heather A processing capability
Facility	Capacity
Crude oil	30,000 bbls/day
Gas compression	54 MMSCFD (million standard cubic feet per day)
Dehydration	54 MMSCFD
Gas lift	54 MMSCFD
Produced water	50,000 bbl/day
Water injection	70,000 bbl/day

=== Broom oil field ===
Fluids from the Broom oil field in Block 2/4a were routed into Heather for treatment and export to Ninian Central. The Broom field is located 7 km from Heather. The field development comprised four gas-lifted production wells and two water injection wells. Lift gas and injection water were supplied from Heather A. Production from Broom started in 2004.

== Decommissioning ==
Following a fire on Heather A in October 2019 and the shutdown of the platform Enquest decided to decommission the platform. This was principally due to the low oil price environment during the coronavirus pandemic. The topsides will be removed for onshore recycling and disposal. Phase 3 Plug and abandonment was completed was completed on Friday 5th April 2025 with the removal of the final conductor. The removal of the jacket will be the subject off a further plan.
