= L8-D gas field =

Natural gas field in the North Sea

Coordinates: 52.9837902169032°N 4.83295440673828°E

L8-D
- Country: Netherlands
- Region: North Sea
- Offshore/onshore: offshore
- Operators: EBN - 41.9% Cirrus Energy - 25.5% TAQA Offshore - 15% EWE - 13.4% TAQA Licenses Offshore - 2.88%

Field history
- Discovery: 2004
- Start of development: 2004
- Start of production: 2007

Production
- Current production of gas: 230×10^{3} m^{3}/d 8×10^{6} cu ft/d
- Estimated gas in place: 9.1×10^{9} m^{3} 323×10^{9} cu ft

The L8-D gas field is a natural gas field located in the North Sea. It was discovered in 2004 and developed by Cirrus Energy. It began production in 2007 and produces natural gas and condensates. The total proven reserves of the L8-D gas field are around 323 billion cubic feet (9.1 billion m^{3}), and production is centered on 8 million cubic feet/day (310,000 m^{3}).
