= Venture Production =

British oil and gas business

Venture Production Ltd
- Company type: Private
- Industry: Energy
- Founded: 1997
- Headquarters: Aberdeen, Scotland, UK
- Key people: Mark Hanafin, Chairman; Bruce Dingwall, CEO
- Revenue: £494.9 million (2008)
- Operating income: £231.1 million (2008)
- Net income: £76.7 million (2008)
- Parent: Centrica
- Website: www.venture-production.com

Venture Production ltd was a leading British-based oil and gas exploration and production business. Its activities were focused on the North Sea. It was a constituent of the FTSE 250 Index, but was delisted following Centrica's purchase of the company in August 2009.

== History ==
The company was formed in 1997 by Larry Kinch, Bruce Dingwall CBE and Dave Neely to exploit oil and gas reserves in the North Sea. It was first listed on the London Stock Exchange in 2002 and delisted in 2009. In 2008 it acquired six proven but undeveloped gas assets from Tullow Oil.

The founder Bruce Dingwall, died on 4th August, 2021 aged 61. He was educated at Fettes College, Edinburgh and Aberdeen University. After graduating he worked as geophysicist with Exxon/Mobil and LASMO (London and Scottish Marine Oil).

The company was sold to Centrica in 2009 after a hostile takeover for £1.3 billion.

== Operations ==
The company's strategy was to develop stranded fields, i.e., fields that were too small to be economic for large companies, needed significant investment or did not fit the strategy of the existing owners. It undertook activities in oil fields and in gas fields.
