= Dana Petroleum =

Oil and gas company

Dana Petroleum Limited
- Formerly: Dana Petroleum Public Limited Company (23 Oct 1997 - 30 Jul 2014)
- Industry: Oil and gas industry
- Headquarters: Aberdeen, Scotland, UK
- Key people: Graham Scotton (Acting CE); David Crawford (CFO)
- Products: Natural gas Petroleum
- Revenue: £1 billion (2013)
- Total assets: £1.37 billion (2013)
- Number of employees: 580
- Parent: Korea National Oil Corporation
- Website: dana-petroleum.com

Dana Petroleum Limited is an oil and gas exploration and production company based in Aberdeen, Scotland. Its activities are focused on the North Sea, Africa and The Middle East. It is a subsidiary of the Korea National Oil Corporation and is a former constituent of the FTSE 250 Index.

== History and current affairs ==
The company was formed in 1994 by Tom Cross to exploit North Sea oil opportunities. In 2007 the company acquired Ener Petroleum for £24 million as well as Devon Energy Corporation's oil and gas operations in Egypt for US$375 million. In June 2010, Dana Petroleum agreed to acquire Petro Canada Netherlands from Suncor Energy for around $393 million, then later in September 2010 the company announced a further $372 million acquisition of certain Petro Canada UK assets.

On 2 July 2010 Dana Petroleum confirmed it had received a £1.5 billion takeover bid. Korea National Oil Corporation confirmed preliminary discussions regarding a possible cash offer for the entire issued and to-be-issued share capital of Dana Petroleum. On 20 August 2010, KNOC went hostile in their bid for Dana Petroleum, the first time an Asian state owned company had made a direct bid for a UK company. By 24 September 2010, KNOC had received 64.26% acceptance of the share offer from shareholders resulting in the Dana Petroleum Board advising shareholders to accept the offer as the board intended to do with regard to their own beneficial holding.

In January 2014, Dana Petroleum began seismic operations in Cameroon in Bakassi West after signing a Production Sharing Contract (PSC) for the block with the Government of Cameroon.

== Operations ==
Dana has exploration and production activities across the North Sea, the Middle East and West Africa.

== See also ==
- Energy in Egypt
