= Abu Hamour =

Abu Hamour بوهامور
- District
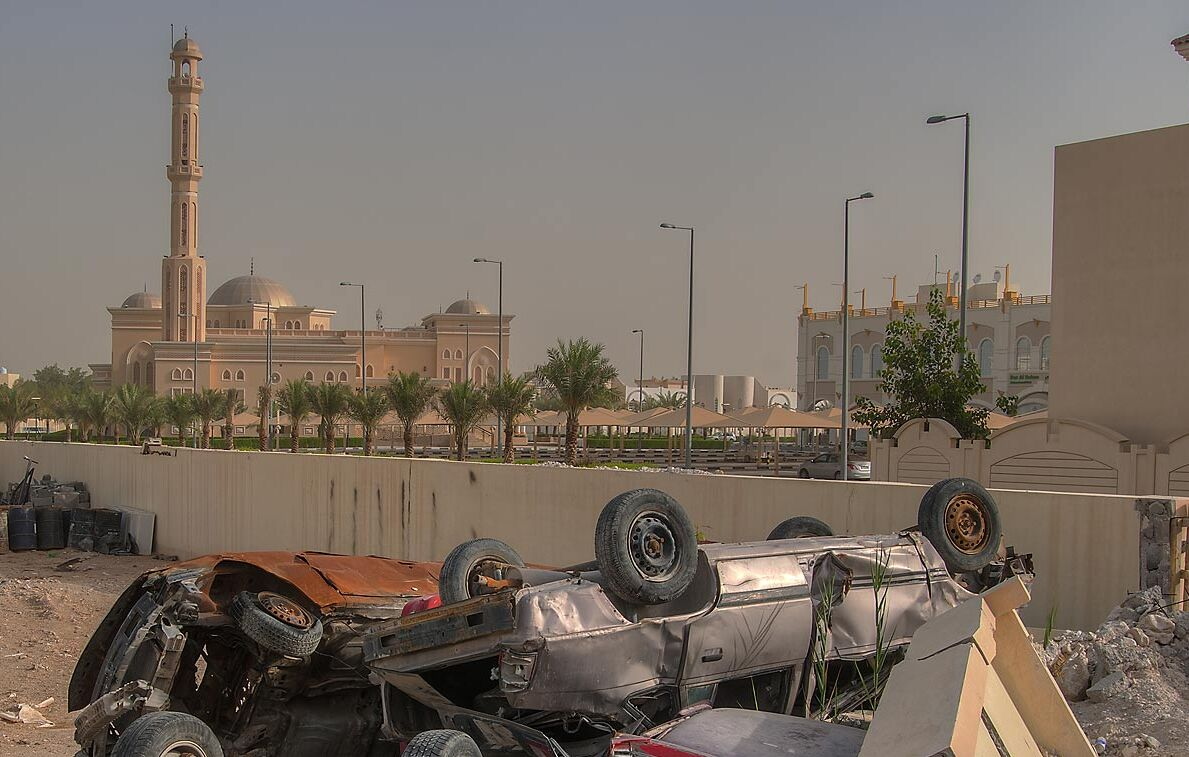
- View of Dar Al Salam Mall and Dar Al Salam Mosque in Abu Hamour

- Location within Qatar
- Coordinates: 25°14′16″N 51°29′57″E
- Country: Qatar
- Municipality: Al Rayyan
- Zone: Zone 56
- District no.: 94

Area
  - Total: 7.2 km^{2} (2.8 sq mi)
- Elevation: 20 m (66 ft)

Abu Hamour (Arabic: بوهامور, romanized: Abū Hāmūr) is a Qatari district in the municipality of Al Rayyan. Known to some as the "Wholesale Market District", it is a part of the Doha Metropolitan Area.

== Etymology ==
In Arabic, abu translates to "father" and in this context is used as a prefix for a specific characteristic of the area. The second part of the name, hamour, is the Arabic term for groupers, a type of fish that is common in Qatari waters. According to local tradition, the district was named after the type of fish most commonly caught by resident fishermen.

== Areas ==
The Qatari government provides the residents with building materials, although many of the structures do not meet regulations and contain illegal modifications. Infrastructure in the area is poor, with many of the 900 to 1000 houses lacking sewage and running water. In 2010, there were two supermarkets and five mosques found in the camp.

=== Wholesale Market Area ===
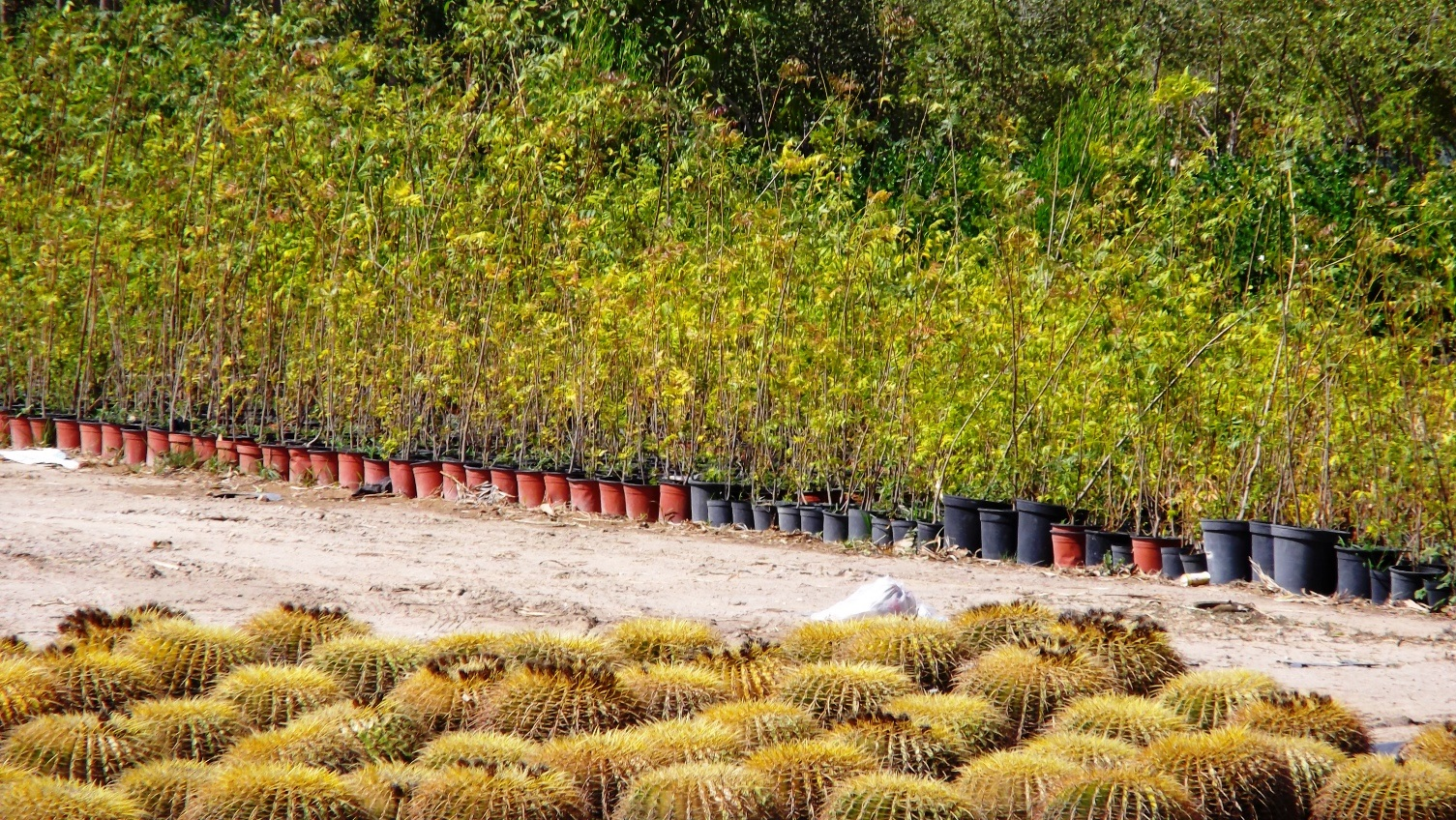
Ornamental plants market in Abu Hamour

The Wholesale Market Area in Abu Hamour previously accommodated Abu Hamour Central Market, one the largest marketplaces in Qatar. In the early 20th century, the wholesale market was located in the Al Jasrah area of Doha in what is presently Souq Waqif. As urban expansion continued unabated in Doha throughout the later 20th century, it was decided that the wholesale market would be transferred to Abu Hamour and remain under the jurisdiction of Doha, thus becoming the new western boundary of Greater Doha. While it still operated, the Abu Hamour Central Market contained a fresh vegetable and fruit market, a livestock market and an ornamental plants market. In early 2017 all wholesale shops in Abu Hamour Wholesale Market were shut down, most being shifted to the Umm Salal Central Market in Umm Salal Ali. The fruit and vegetable market was moved to Al Sailiya, while the livestock market, which frustrated locals had attributed a foul odor to, was transferred to Abu Samra in southern Qatar. Municipal officials plan to convert the now defunct Abu Hamour Central Market into a commercial complex.

== Industry ==
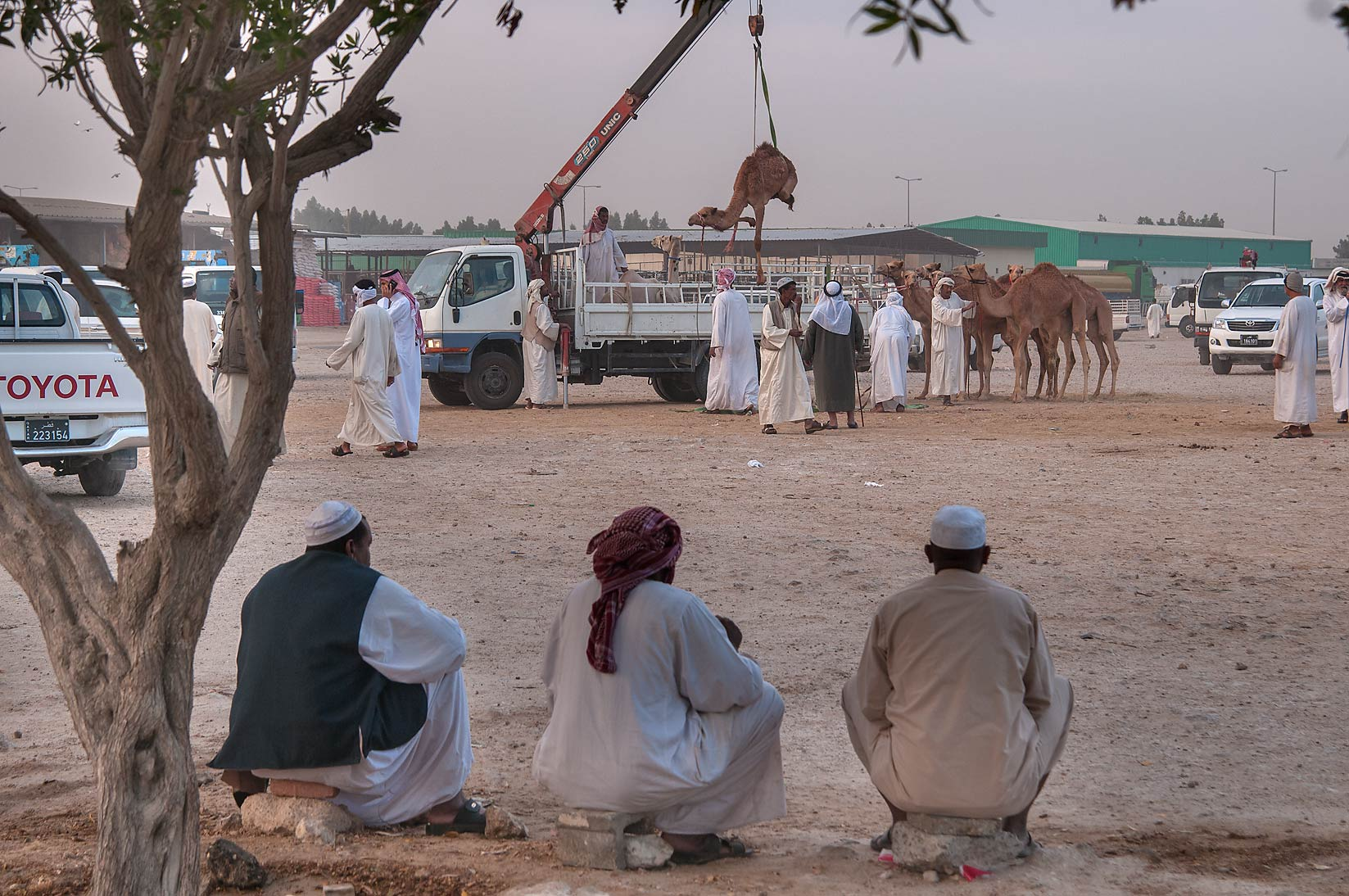
Men watch a camel being lifted by crane in the Abu Hamour Wholesale Market

As a result of its central location, Abu Hamour is an increasingly popular choice for retailers. A number of retail outlets from elsewhere in the country have relocated to the neighborhood. Historically, Abu Hamour hosted the largest wholesale market in the country, but in April 2017 the wholesale market was transferred to Umm Salal Ali.

Abu Hamour is the site of a refined petroleum products distribution depot which formerly belonged to the National Oil Distribution Company (NODCO), a subsidiary of QatarEnergy, until 2002 when newly-established Qatar Fuel assumed responsibility for the depot's management.

== Transport ==
Currently, the underground Abu Hamour Metro Station is under construction, having been launched during Phase 1A. Once completed, it will be part of Doha Metro's Green Line.

== Central Municipal Council ==
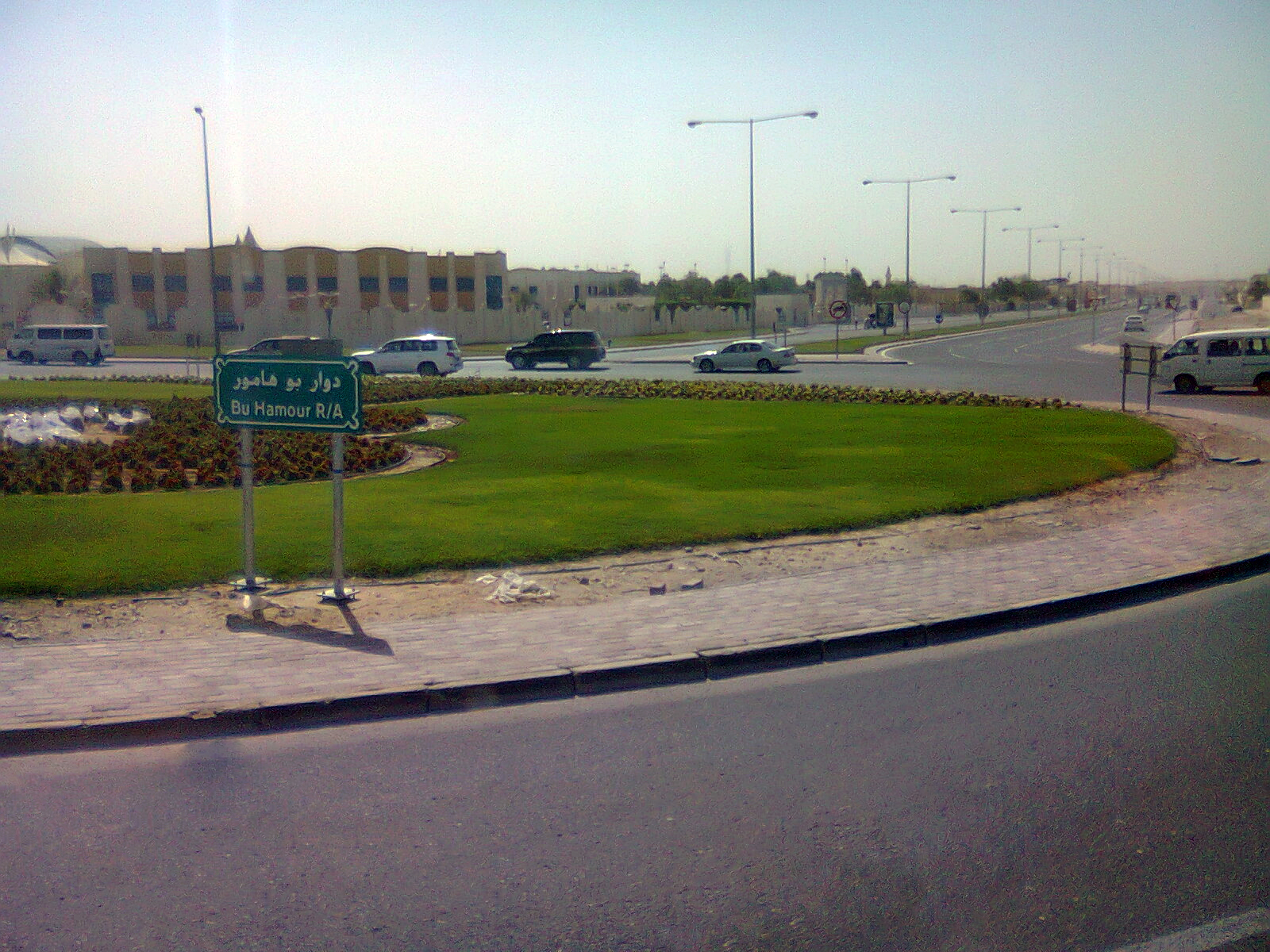
Roundabout in Abu Hamour

When free elections of the Central Municipal Council first took place in Qatar during 1999, Abu Hamour was designated the constituency seat of constituency no. 12. It would remain constituency seat in the next three consecutive elections until the fifth municipal elections in 2015, when it was split between constituencies no. 10 and no. 11. In the inaugural municipal elections in 1999, Hamad Mubarak Al Marri won the elections, receiving 36.4%, or 207, of the votes. Runner-up that year was Hafeez Salem Al Nabat Al Marri, whose share of the votes was 111, or 19.5%. Voter turnout was 75.7%. Khalid Mohammed Al-Ma'adid was elected in the 2002 elections. For the third municipal elections in 2007, Hamad Rashid Al Nabat was elected constituency representative. In 2011, Saleh Jaber Al Marri won the elections.

== Education ==
The following schools are located in Abu Hamour:

Name of School	Curriculum	Grade	Genders	Official Website	Ref
Al Arqam Academy	International	Kindergarten – Secondary	Both	N/A	
Al-Muntazah English School	International	Kindergarten – Secondary	Both	N/A	
Al Redwan Kindergarten	Independent	Kindergarten	Both	N/A	
Bangladesh M.H.M High School and College	International	Kindergarten – Primary	Both	N/A	
Birla Public School - Abu Hamour branch	International	Kindergarten – Secondary	Both	Official website	
Doha Modern Indian School	International	Kindergarten – Secondary	Both	N/A	
Ideal Indian School	International	Kindergarten – Secondary	Both	Official website	
Iranian Junior High School For Boys	International	Primary – Secondary	Male-only	N/A	
Iranian Elementary School For Boys	International	Primary	Male-only	N/A	
M.E.S Indian school	International	Kindergarten – Secondary	Both	Official website	
Shantiniketan Indian Private School	International	Kindergarten – Secondary	Both	N/A	
Rajagiri Public School	Indian	Kindergarten – Secondary	Both	N/A	
