= Tyra Field =

Gas condensate field in the North Sea

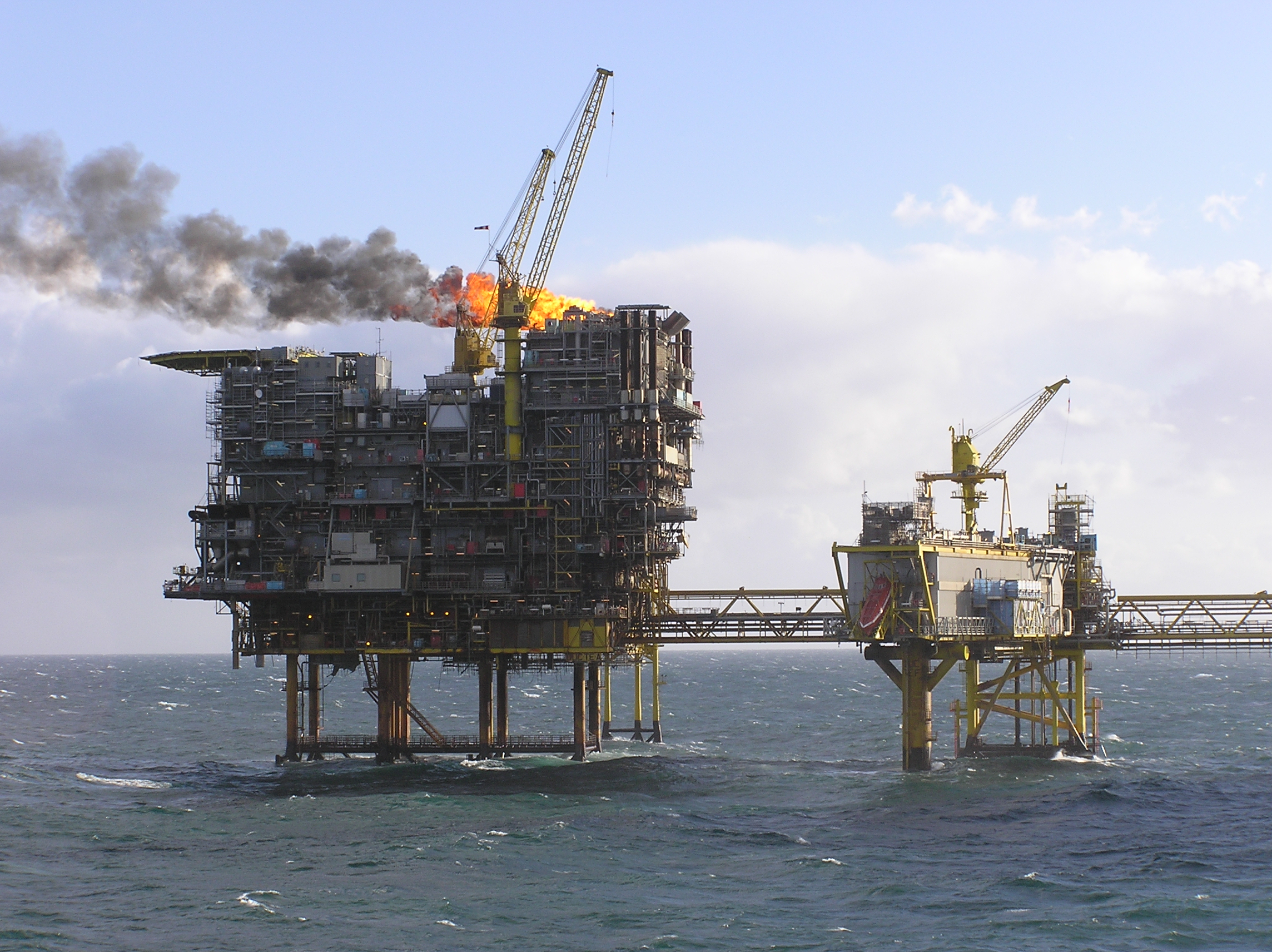
- Platform at Tyra East
- Country: Denmark
- Region: North Sea
- Block: 5504/11; 5504/12
- Offshore/onshore: offshore
- Operator: Total
- Partners: Total; Noreco; Nordsofonden

Field history
- Discovery: 1968
- Start of production: 1984

Production
- Current production of gas: 237.8×10^{6} cu ft/d (6.73×10^{6} m^{3}/d)
- Estimated gas in place: 1,250×10^{9} cu ft (35×10^{9} m^{3})
- Producing formations: Danian and Upper Cretaceous Chalk

Tyra Field is the largest gas condensate field in the Danish Sector of the North Sea. It was discovered in 1968 and production started in 1984. The field is owned by Dansk Undergrunds Consortium, a partnership between Total, BlueNord and Nordsofonden, and operated by Total. The reservoir depth is about 2,000 metres (6,600 ft) and it covers area of 90 kilometres (56 mi) in the water depth of 37–40 metres (121–131 ft). The Tyra field has a number of satellite fields, including Roar, Svend and Tyra Southeast fields.

== History ==
In August 2017 Maersk Oil was sold to Total S.A. with the takeover completed in 2018.

== Facilities ==
The Tyra Field has two production complexes named Tyra West and Tyra East, connected by pipelines. Tyra West includes oil and gas processing plants which in addition to the gas produced at the Tyra field, processes also gas from Halfdan field and the Valdemar oil field. The complex consists of two wellhead platforms, one processing and accommodation platform, and one gas flare stack. Tyra East processes also oil and gas from Valdemar, Roar, Svend, Tyra Southeast, Harald gas field, Lulita, Gorm and Dan oil fields. It consists of two wellhead platforms, one processing and accommodation platform, one gas flare stack, and one riser platform.

The installations developed for the Tyra field were:

Tyra field installations
Installation	Location Block	Platforms	Function	Type	Legs	Well slots	Installed	Production start	Production to
Tyra West	6.2	TW-A	Processing (2 x 135 MMSCFD)	Steel jacket	4	–	March 1982	May 1984	TE-E
Tyra West	6.2	TW-B	Drilling & wellhead	Steel jacket	4	12	March 1982	May 1984	TW-A
Tyra West	6.2	TW-C	Drilling & wellhead	Steel jacket	4	12	May 1983	1985	TW-A
Tyra West	6.2	TW-D	Flare	Steel jacket	3	–	April–May 1983	–	–
Tyra West	6.2	TW-E	Production	Steel jacket				1984	
Tyra East	6.2	TCP-A	Processing (2 X 135 MMSCFD) & accommodation	Steel jacket	8	–	March–June 1983	June 1984	TE-E
Tyra East	6.2	TE-B	Drilling & wellhead	Steel jacket	4	12	February 1983 1982	June 1984	TCP-A
Tyra East	6.2	TE-C	Drilling & wellhead	Steel jacket	4	12	May 1983	1985	TCP-A
Tyra East	6.2	TE-D	Flare	Steel jacket	3	–	April–May 1983	–	–
Tyra East	6.2	TE-E	Riser	Steel jacket	4	–	March 1982	1984	Jutland onshore
Tyra East	6.2	TE-F	Production	Steel jacket				1995	

In total, the field has 20 gas-producing wells, and 28 oil and gas-producing wells.

Fluids from the drilling & wellhead platforms are routed to an inlet three phase inlet separator on the ‘A’ processing platforms. The separator separated the fluids into gas, condensate and produced water. Gas undergoes water dehydration through contact with glycol. On TCP-A the gas is comingled with gas from Gorm, Dan and Tyra West. The combined gas stream is chilled to achieve a hydrocarbon dewpoint. The gas is compressed from 1000 to 2000 psi (pounds-force per square inch) in 5 Ruston TB5000 gas turbine driven gas compressors (24,500 brake horse power total), and is fiscally metered before export onshore to Jutland. The design export rate is 11.5 million cubic metres (405 million cubic feet) per day at standard conditions.

Condensate from the inlet separator is routed to a coalescer after which it is comingled with condensate from Tyra West. The combined stream is routed successively through a 1st stage, 2nd stage and 3rd stage separators operating at successively lower pressures. Gas from the 2nd and 3rd stage separators is compressed and joins the gas from the 1st stage separator and is routed into the inlet separator. Condensate from the 3rd stage separator is fiscally metered and is exported onshore via the Gorm installation. The design export rate is 20,000 barrels/day.

Produced water from the inlet separator is treated to remove and condensate and is discharged overboard.

Produced oil is transported to the Gorm E riser platform in the Gorm field, and further through the subsea pipeline to the oil terminal in Fredericia, Denmark. Produced natural gas is transported from the Tyra East riser platform to Nybro Gas Processing Plant, Denmark, and from Tyra West riser platform to the Netherlands through the Tyra West – F3 and NOGAT pipelines.

== Redevelopment project ==
Due to the production facilities having sunk 6m Maersk Oil announced on 1 December 2017 Maersk Oil the redevelopment of Tyra Field, which would mean decommissioning the 35 year old facilities and installing new ones. The living and processing platform on Tyra East and Tyra West will be scrapped. One new living platform and one new processing platform will be built. The living quarter platform will be constructed by Italian EPC contractor Rosetti marino, while processing platform will be constructed in Kuala Lumpur by American EPC contractor McDermott International.

In July 2018 Modern American Recycling Services based in Frederikshavn secured a contract to scrap the two platforms.

Up until the temporary closure in September 2019, the Tyra field processed 90% of all gas produced in the Danish part of the North Sea.

The decommission project is estimated to cost 4 Billion DKK and the new facilities will cost 17 Billion DKK. All in all the project is expected use 1.3 million working hours.

The new facilities were planned to be ready for production in July 2022, but this was postponed to July 2023 due to the COVID-19 pandemic. The new platform started in 2024.

== Tyra field satellites ==
The Tyra field has a number of satellite fields. These include Roar, Svend and Tyra Southeast fields.

The characteristics of the satellite fields are as follows.

Field	Roar	Svend	Tyra Southeast
Prospect	Bent	North Arne / Otto	
Reservoir	Chalk	Chalk	Chalk
Geological age	Danian and Upper Cretaceous	Danian and Upper Cretaceous	Danian and Upper Cretaceous
Coordinates	55.767485°N 4.64839°E	56.178324°N 4.179324°E	55.639618°N 4.882641°E
Block	5504/7	5604/25	5504/12
Reservoir depth	2,025 m	2,500 m	2,050 m
Field delineation	84 km^{2}	48 km^{2}	142 km^{2}
Reserves	Oil 0.1 million m^{3} Gas 1.7 billion Nm^{3}	Oil 0.5 million m^{3} Gas 0.1 billion Nm^{3}	Oil 7.7 million m^{3} Gas 16.5 billion Nm^{3}
Discovered	1968	1975 North Arne, 1982 Otto	1992

The Roar, Svend and Tyra Southeast fields are developed through three offshore installations as shown.

Field	Roar	Svend	Tyra Southeast
Production start	1996	1996	2002
Water depth	46 m	65 m	39 m
Installation	Steel STAR platform	Steel STAR platform	Steel STAR platform
Function	Wellhead, separation	Wellhead	Wellhead, separation
Substructure weight tonnes	950	1150	880
Topsides weight tonnes	550	575	550
Number of wells	4 gas	4	2 oil, 5 gas
Status	Closed 2019	Closed 2015	Closed 2019
Export, well fluids	11 km 16-inch multiphase pipeline to Tyra East	pipeline to Tyra East	pipeline to Tyra East

The oil and gas production profile of the Roar, Svend and Tyra Southeast fields is as shown.

Roar, Svend and Tyra Southeast oil production (1000 m^{3}) 1996-2010
Year	1996	1997	1998	1999	2000	2001	2002	2003	2004	2005	2006	2007	2008	2009	2010
Roar	320	427	327	259	285	317	175	121	98	94	51	35	28	30	24
Svend	836	1,356	635	521	576	397	457	280	326	324	296	299	278	195	190
Tyra Southeast							493	343	580	614	446	377	429	374	225

Roar, Svend and Tyra Southeast oil production (1000 m^{3}) 2011-2022
Year	2011	2012	2013	2014	2015	2016	2017	2018	2019	2020	2021	2022	Total
Roar	16	2	4	6	6	8	82	100	76				2,891
Svend	145	171	183	160	136								7,759
Tyra Southeast	165	148	98	91	118	283	383	316	162				5,644

Roar, Svend and Tyra Southeast gas production (million normal m^{3}) 1996-2010
Year	1996	1997	1998	1999	2000	2001	2002	2003	2004	2005	2006	2007	2008	2009	2010
Roar	1,332	1,964	1,458	1,249	1,407	1,702	1,052	915	894	860	489	367	417	398	213
Svend	85	152	84	65	75	48	61	43	38	34	28	28	24	16	27
Tyra Southeast							447	452	1,233	1,337	1,108	848	889	939	911

Roar, Svend and Tyra Southeast gas production (million normal 1000 m^{3}) 2011-2022
Year	2011	2012	2013	2014	2015	2016	2017	2018	2019	2020	2021	2022	Total
Roar	171	24	28	46	40	46	264	278	194				15,809
Svend	24	27	20	16	15								908
Tyra Southeast	626	610	306	201	248	554	981	734	391				12,816

== See also ==
- Gorm Field
- Dan oil field
- Skjold oil field
- Halfdan field
- Siri, Nini and Cecilie oil fields
- Valdemar oil and gas field
- South Arne oil and gas field
- Harald gas field
- Ravn oil field
