= Skjold oil field =

Natural gas and oilfield in the North Sea

- Location within North Sea
- Country: Denmark
- Region: North Sea
- Block: 5504/16
- Offshore/onshore: Offshore
- Coordinates: 55°31′53″N 4°54′34″E
- Operator: Maersk, TotalEnergies
- Owner: BlueNord; Nordsøfonden; TotalEnergies

Field history
- Discovery: 1977
- Start of production: November 1982
- Peak of production: 47.08 thousand barrels per day
- Peak year: 1991
- Abandonment: 2038

Production
- Current production of oil: 7,152 barrels per day (~3.639×10^{5} t/a)
- Year of current production of oil: 2022
- Current production of gas: 4.45×10^{6} m^{3}/d (157×10^{6} cu ft/d)
- Producing formations: Danian and Upper Cretaceous chalk

The Skjold oil field (Danish: Skjoldfeltet) is a crude oil and associated gas production field in the Danish sector of the central North Sea, close to the Danish-German median line. Production of oil started in 1982, peak oil was achieved in 1991 and production is expected to continue until 2038.

== The field ==
The Skjold oil field is located in Block 5504/16 of the Danish North Sea. The name Skjold translates as 'shield' in English. The field was discovered in March 1977 and is a Danian and Upper Cretaceous chalk anticline with salt tectonics. The reservoir has the following characteristics:

Skjold reservoir properties
Parameter	Value
Field delineation	33 km^{2}
Reservoir depth	1,600 m
API gravity	30°
Gas/oil ratio	510 scf/bbl
Sulfur	0.30%
Recoverable reserves	30-45 million barrels

== Owners and operators ==
The field was originally licensed to a joint venture called Dansk Undergrunds Consortium (DUC) comprising Shell (40.0%), A.P. Moeller (30.0%), Chevron (15.0%), and Texaco (15.0%). The field was originally operated by Maersk Oil & Gas A/S.

By 2013 ownership of the Skjold field was by Norwegian Energy (37.0%), TotalEnergies (43.0%) and Nordsøfonden (20.0%). The field was operated in 2013 by Maersk Olle og Gas A/S.

As of 2023, it is owned by BlueNord (36.8 %), Nordsøfonden (20.0 %) and TotalEnergies (43.2%). The field is operated by TotalEnergies.

== Development ==
The field was originally developed by a single unattended wellhead platform. No processing was undertaken on the Skjold, and well fluids were routed via an 11km, 6-inch pipeline to the Gorm complex for processing. The Skjold platform was remotely operated from the Gorm installation.

In 1988 a system for the treatment and injection of water into the reservoir was installed on a jack-up rig adjacent to Skjold. This was later replaced by permanent water injection facilities on Gorm with injection water piped to Skjold.

Further infrastructure was subsequently added to the field. This comprised two installations, designated Skjold B and Skjold C, bridge linked to the original installation now designated Skjold A. Skjold B is a wellhead platform allowing further wells to be drilled to reach outlying areas of the reservoir. Skjold C is an accommodation platform. Outline details of the Skjold field platforms are summarised in the table.

Skjold field infrastructure
Platform	Skjold A	Skjold B	Skjold C
Coordinates	55°31’53”N 04°54’34”E	55°31'52"N 4°54'32"E	55°31'52"N 4°51'24"E
Water depth, metres	40	40	40
Fabrication	Jacket: Monberg & Thersen, Aalborg Topsides: Volund Energiteknik, Essbjerg		
Jacket / substructure weight, tonnes	1308	545	830
Topside weight, tonnes	900	1100	1200
Function	Wellhead	Wellhead, bridge link to A platform	Accommodation, bridge link to A platform
Accommodation	8 (emergency)	Nil	16
Type	Steel jacket	STAR (see note)	STAR
Legs	4	3	3
Piles	4	3	3
Well slots	9	7	Nil
Helideck	S61 helicopter	—	Yes
Installed	May 1982	1994	1994
Production start	November 1982	1994	—
Oil and gas production to	Gorm D	A platform	—

Note: STAR (Slim Tripod Adapted for Rig) is a concept developed by Maersk comprising a three-leg base piled to the seabed supporting a single large diameter column above sea level.

In 1994 a second 11 km pipeline from Skjold to Gorm was laid, this was associated with the increased production from the Skjold field.

As of 2023, there are 16 oil-producing wells and seven water injection wells.

== Production ==
Peak oil production was in 1991 at 47.08 thousand barrels of oil per day.

To maintain production the reservoir pressure is kept high by water injection. Injection water is obtained from the Gorm complex. By 2014 there were 19 production wells and nine water injection wells.

Total fluid production to January 2014 was 45.38 million cubic metres of oil, 3.75 billion normal cubic metres of gas, and 70.65 million cubic metres of water. Water injection was 126.04 million cubic metres of water. The estimated reserves were 6.4 million cubic metres of oil, sufficient to sustain economic production until 2038.

The Danish Energy Agency publishes tables and bar charts of oil, gas and water production from the field, from commissioning in 1982 to the present day.

== See also ==
- Gorm Field
- Tyra field
- Dan oil field
- Halfdan field
- Siri, Nini and Cecilie oil fields
- South Arne oil and gas field
- Valdemer oil and gas field
- Harald gas field
- Ravn oil field
