= North Oil Company (Qatar) =

Joint venture between Qatar Petroleum and TotalEnergies

- Company type: Joint venture
- Founded: 2017
- Headquarters: Al Dafna, Doha, Qatar
- Key people: Khalid Al Rumaihi (Chairman); Frederic Paux (CEO)
- Parent: Qatar Energy; TotalEnergies
- Website: www.noc.qa

North Oil Company (NOC) is a crude oil and natural gas company based in Qatar.

== History ==
The creation of the North Oil Company (NOC) was announced in June 2016 by QatarEnergy as a joint venture with TotalEnergies (30%), to develop and operate the Al Shaheen oil field for 25 years. Operations, along with production, sale, and export of crude oil started on July 14, 2017. TotalEnergies announced an investment of around $2 billion into the oil field between 2017 and 2022, and QatarEnergy announced that total investments into the field would be around $3.5 billion.

From 1992 – 2017, the Al Shaheen Oil Field was developed and operated by Maersk Oil.

In July 2017, the first crude tanker from Al Shaheen was loaded. In November 2018, it was announced that PetroVietnam was contracted by NOC to further develop the second phase of the field up to 2020, including the erection of three new wellhead platforms and three bridges.

== Corporate structure ==
NOC is led by chief executive officer Regis AGUT. Khalid al Rumaihi is chairman of the board of directors. Other members of the board are Abdulaziz Al-Mannai, Jassim Al-Marzouqi, Mohammed Al Ghanem, Rashid Al Fehaidi, Hamad Al-Baker, Lionel Levha, Pierre Ranger and Laurent Wolffsheim.

== Operations ==
North Oil operates the Al Shaheen Oil Field. The field is situated in Qatari waters, around 180 kilometers north from Doha, 80 kilometers north of Ras Laffan and the north-east coast of Qatar. Al Shaheen is the largest offshore field in Qatar and is part of the South Pars/North Dome Gas-Condensate field, stretching across 9,700 square kilometres in Iranian and Qatari waters. The field is considered one of the largest and most complex oilfields in the world.

Current production of the field was 300,000 barrels per day (48,000 m^{3}/d) in 2017, produced by 33 platforms and close to 400 wells. The field yields more than 100 million barrels per year, 45% of Qatar's total oil production.

NOC's current goal is to maintain current production and output levels from the field, which is considered difficult in complex fields like Al Shaheen, given the natural decrease of pressure and resources. In order to achieve their current goal, the company plans to drill more than 100 new wells up to 2022.
