= Al Shaheen Oil Field =

Oil and natural gas field in Qatar

- Location of Al Shaheen Oil Field in the Persian Gulf
- Country: Qatar
- Region: Persian Gulf
- Block: 5
- Offshore/onshore: offshore
- Coordinates: 26.605°N 51.932°E
- Operator: North Oil Company (Qatar)
- Partners: TotalEnergies; QatarEnergy

Field history
- Discovery: 1992
- Start of production: 1994

Production
- Current production of oil: 270,000 barrels per day (~1.3×10^{7} t/a)
- Year of current production of oil: 2006
- Producing formations: Nahr Umr, Shuaiba and Kharaib formations

The Al Shaheen Oil Field is a production oil and gas field off the north east coast of Qatar in the Persian Gulf, 80 kilometres (50 mi) north of Doha. The oil field lies above the North Gas Field, one of the largest gas fields in the world. The field has been operated by Maersk Oil Qatar AS of Denmark until July 2017 under a production sharing agreement with QatarEnergy, on behalf of the state of Qatar. As of June 2016, QatarEnergy and the French major TotalEnergies established a new company known as North Oil Company. The new company is 70% owned by QatarEnergy and 30% by TotalEnergies. North Oil Company took over field operations on 14 July 2017.

== History ==
Though well North West Deep-2, drilled by Shell in 1974, blew out briefly from the Shaheen reservoir, the oil field was only formally discovered in 1992 by Maersk Oil. The drilling of appraisal wells was completed in 1994 using horizontal drilling techniques. Regular oil production started the same year. In 1995–1996, production facilities were extended with subsea export pipelines, an additional single point mooring loading buoy, new process facilities and a STAR type wellhead platform.

In April 2004, the extension area north of block 5 was included to the production sharing agreement. Inauguration of new offshore facilities took place on 23 February 2005.

In May 2008, Maersk Oil drilled the world record extended reach well BD-04A in the field with the GSF Rig 127 operated by Transocean. The well was drilled incident free to a record measured length of 12,290 m (40,320 ft) including a record horizontal reach of 10,900 m (35,770 ft) in 36 days.

From 2004 until August 2009 the massive supertanker, Knock Nevis, the largest ship built to date, was moored there as a floating storage and offloading unit (FSO). In January 2010, she was replaced by both the FSO Asia, and in August 2010, the FSO Africa replaced the Astro Canopus. Both vessels are owned as a joint venture by Overseas Shipholding Group and Euronav.

In June 2016 France's TotalEnergies won a tender to replace Maersk Oil as operator of Al Shaheen Oil Field and commenced operating the field on 14 July 2017 under a joint venture agreement between Total (30%) and QatarEnergy (70%) through a new company named North Oil Company.

== Geology ==
The oil and gas producing formation is the Kharaib, Shuaiba and Nahr Umr Formations (Early Cretaceous). The field is characterized by low permeability, limited thickness, and geological complexity.

== Production ==
The field consists of 131 operational production and water injection wells, 18 permanent platforms, and six production installations connected by 20 pipelines. In 2006, Al Shaheen's production of 38,000 cubic metres per day (240,000 bbl/d) accounted for a significant portion of Qatar's total oil production of 815,000 barrels per day (129,600 m^{3}/d). Although the production capacity reaches 41,000 cubic metres per day (260,000 bbl/d), the current actual production is only 32,000 cubic metres per day (200,000 bbl/d) due to OPEC quotas. A development plan between Maersk Oil and QatarEnergy calls for an increase in production to 83,500 cubic metres per day (525,000 bbl/d). This increase is expected to account for the majority of growth in Qatar's petroleum output over this time.

Oil is currently stored in the floating storage and offloading vessels FSO Asia and FSO Africa. Produced oil is transported to the Mesaieed Industrial City for processing and export. There is a plan to build a new 40,000-cubic-metre-per-day (250,000 bbl/d) refinery in Mesaieed to process oil from Al Shaheen. This plan has been postponed.

The Al-Shaheen field also produces associated gas. The gas production is estimated about 6,200,000 cubic metres per day (220×10^{6} cu ft/d) of which 3.5×10^{−12}–4.2×10^{−12} cubic megametres per day (125×10^{6}–150×10^{6} cu ft/d) is exported through the North Field Alpha facilities to Mesaieed, 8.5×10^{−13} cubic megametres per day (30×10^{6} cu ft/d) is consumed on-site for power and heat generation, and 1.1×10^{−12} cubic megametres per day (40×10^{6} cu ft/d) is flared.

== Records ==
The Kola Superdeep Borehole was the longest and deepest borehole in the world for nearly 30 years. However, in May 2008, a new record for borehole length was established by the extended-reach drilling (ERD) well BD-04A, in the Al Shaheen oil field. It was drilled to 12,289 m (40,318 ft), with a record horizontal reach of 10,902 m (35,768 ft) in only 36 days.

On 28 January 2011, Exxon Neftegas Ltd., operator of the Sakhalin-I project, drilled the world's longest extended-reach well offshore on the Russian island of Sakhalin. It has surpassed the length of the Al Shaheen well. Sakhalin-I's Odoptu OP-11 well reached a measured total length of 12,345 m (40,502 ft) and a horizontal displacement of 11,475 m (37,648 ft). Exxon Neftegas completed the well in 60 days.

On 27 August 2012, Exxon Neftegas Ltd beat its own record by completing Sakhalin-I's Z-44 Chayvo well. This ERD well reached a measured total length of 12,376 metres (40,604 ft).
