= Tyra West – F3 pipeline =

Danish-Dutch natural gas submarine pipeline

- Location of Tyra West – F3 pipeline

Location
- Country: Denmark, Netherlands
- Direction: East–west
- Start: Tyra West platform
- Passes through: North Sea
- To: F3 platform

General information
- Type: natural gas
- Partners: Maersk Oil; Royal Dutch Shell; Chevron Corporation; Energinet
- Operator: Maersk Oil
- Commissioned: 2004

Technical information
- Length: 100 km (62 mi)
- Maximum discharge: 5.5 bcm per year
- Diameter: 26 in (660 mm)

Tyra West – F3 pipeline is a 100-kilometre-long (62-mile) natural gas submarine pipeline connecting Danish and Dutch continental shelf pipeline systems. It facilitates the export of Danish gas into North West Europe. The 660-millimetre (26-inch) pipeline, which cost over US$200 million, runs from the Maersk-operated Tyra West platform on the Danish continental shelf to the F3 – FB platform on the Dutch continental shelf. From the F3 – FB platform, gas is fed through the NOGAT pipeline system to the Netherlands natural gas hub in Den Helder.

The pipeline is operated by Maersk Oil & Gas and owned by Royal Dutch Shell (23%), TotalEnergies (19.5%), Chevron Corporation (7.5%) and Energinet (50%). The pipeline has a capacity of 5.5 billion cubic metres (190 billion cubic feet) of natural gas per year. It is operated by Maersk Oil. The pipeline gives each owner divided rights to transport gas from Denmark for subsequent sale at Den Helder.
