= Qatar Steel =

Qatari steel milling company

Coordinates: 24°57′4″N 51°34′29″E

- Company type: Subsidiary
- Industry: Steel Milling
- Founded: 1974; 52 years ago
- Headquarters: Mesaieed, Qatar
- Key people: Saad Rashid Al-Muhannadi (chairman); Abdulrahman Ali Al-Abdulla (Managing Director and CEO)
- Products: Sponge Iron; Hot Briquetted Iron (HBI); Steel Billets; Deformed Bars; Wire-Rod and Rebar In Coils
- Number of employees: 1,820
- Parent: Industries Qatar
- Subsidiaries: Qatar Steel Company FZE
- Website: www.qatarsteel.com.qa

Qatar Steel (formerly QASCO) was formed in 1974 as the first integrated steel plant in the Eastern Arabia region. Commercial production commenced in 1978 with the company becoming wholly owned by Industries Qatar in 2003.

== Business organization ==
Plant facilities include a Midrex process based DRI/HBI Combo Mega Module, electric arc furnaces with a ladle refining furnace, a continuous casting plant and rolling mills. Other auxiliaries include jetty facilities, a main power substation, quality control center, maintenance shops and facilities for sea/fresh water, compressed air, natural gas and a clinic. It is named in top four steel producers in the Middle East by MEED. Its mill site is located in Mesaieed Industrial Area 45 kilometres (28 mi) south of Doha. The company also operates a UAE based subsidiary, Qatar Steel Company FZE.

== History ==
Qatar Steel is the new corporate identity and the trade name for Qatar Steel Company, QSC. It was incorporated on October 14, 1974, by Emiri Decree No. 130 under its former name QASCO as the first integrated steel plant in a GCC countries. It was a joint venture between the Government of Qatar [70%] and two Japanese companies, Kobe Steel [20%] and Tokyo Boeki [10%]. It started its full operation and steel production in 1978 and in 1997, shares of Kobe Steel and Tokyo Boeki were acquired by the Government of Qatar, which was later transferred to QatarEnergy and thereafter to Industries Qatar (IQ) during a reorganization in April 2003.

=== Timeline ===
Year	Milestone
1974	Qatar Steel was established on 14 October with its former name QASCO.
1978	Commenced steel production.
1981	Achieved 1 million tons of production for DR, EF, CC and RM.
1989	Achieved 5 million tons of production from all plants.
1991	Acquired Japanese Industrial Standards (JIS) mark certification.
1995	Acquired ISO 9002 certification.
1997	Fully owned by the Government of Qatar.
1999	Electric Arc Furnace 3 (EAF3) commissioned with a capacity of 622,000MT. Acquired ISO 14001 Environmental Management Certification.
2002	Won accreditation to the ISO 14001 Environmental Management Programme.
2003	Wholly owned and became one of the IQ companies. Marks 25th Silver Anniversary. Successfully implemented ERP e-Business Suite to improve productivity Achieves SASO certification. Achieves 15 million tons production of molten steel and billets.
2007	Unveils new corporate identity with its new brand name Qatar Steel bearing the slogan “We Make Steel Matter”.
2008	Celebrates 30 years in business Named in top four steel producers in the Middle East by MEED
2009	Qatar Steel receives UKCARES Product Conformity in Steel for Reinforcement of Concrete Certificate (BS 4449:2005 Grade B500B) for sizes varying from 10.0mm~40.0mm.
2010	Qatar Steel obtains Dubai Central Laboratory (DCL) Product Conformity in Steel for Reinforcement of Concrete Certificate (BS 4449:2005Grade B500B) for sizes varying from 10.0mm~40.0mm.]

== Environmental commitment ==
Compared to other steel plants the Qatar Steel's most significant advantage is that its production is based on DRI which uses clean raw material. It employs various methods of recycling and re-using production waste, basing its production process on the utilization of clean raw materials and, steel making technology that is the lowest producer of CO_{2} emission per ton.

- Environment Management Program
  Under an Environment Management Program, the company's most significant environmental contribution is centered on diffusing dust emissions, which to a large degree are the results of technology utilized in the 1970s. The revamping of the dust collection system in the existing facilities is within the scope of these projects.
  As a part of waste management, Qatar Steel continues to study various options to re-using / re-cycling its production waste. Palletizing DR product dust and EF dust, recycling of Refractory bricks and extracting iron from slag are some of the programs under progress. The utilization of used tyres as a carbon source in the steel melting process is an achievement in the right direction. This project may be able to contribute to solving or reducing a major community waste problem.
- ISO 14001:2004
  The company migrates to the new environmental ISO 14001:2004 standard as another move towards these globally accepted environment standards. The alignment of environmental objectives, targets and programs with the corporate HSE objective were considered significant achievements during this transition.

== Facilities in Dubai ==
Qatar Steel Company FZE was established in August 2003 to produce steel wire-rod products.

The company operates two primary facilities at its 60,000 Sq. meter Jebel Ali Free Zone site. The facilities have a yearly production capacity of 280,000 tonnes of wire rods and 300,000 tons of bars.

== See also ==
- List of steel producers
