= Halfdan field =

Danish oil field in the North Sea

- Country: Denmark
- Region: North Sea
- Location/blocks: 5505/13
- Offshore/onshore: Offshore
- Coordinates: 55.230115N 5.005754E
- Operators: Total E&P Denmark.
- Owner: TotalEnergies, Nordsofonden, and Noreco.

Field history
- Discovery: 1998
- Start of production: 1999
- Peak of production: 6.085 million cubic metres of oil
- Peak year: 2006

Production
- Estimated gas in place: 6.9×10^{9} m^{3} (240×10^{9} cu ft)
- Producing formations: Chalk

Halfdan is a significant oil and gas field in the south-western part of the Danish sector of the southern North Sea. The field has been in production since 1999. The Sif and Igor fields are satellites to Hallfdan.

== The field ==
The Halfdan field comprises the contiguous Halfdan, Sif and Igor fields in Blocks 5505/13 and 5505/16 of the North Sea. The Sif and Igor fields are respectively to the north and east of the Halfdan field, but are exploited through the Halfdan offshore infrastructure. The south west of the field contains oil of the Maastrichian layers and the north and east area has gas of the Danian era. Key parameters of the fields are given in the table.

Halfdan, Sif and Igor reservoir
Parameter	Value
Reservoir rock	Chalk
Geological age	Danian and Upper Cretaceous
Depth, ft	2030-2100
Discovery	1998
Field delineation, Halfdan	100 km^{2}
Field delineation, Sif	40 km^{2}
Field delineation, Igor	109 km^{2}
Oil density	33° API
Oil reserves	35.9 million m^{3}
Gas reserves	6.9 billion Nm^{3}

== Owners and operators ==
The Halfdan field is currently owned jointly by TotalEnergies, Nordsofonden, and BlueNord. It was formerly operated by Maersk and is currently operated by Total E&P Denmark.

== Production infrastructure ==
The Halfdan, Sif and Igor fields are exploited by three offshore installations Halfdan A, Halfdan B and Halfdan C, which were installed and came into operation sequentially. The A and B installations are staffed multi-platform bridge-linked facilities. And Halfdan C is an unstaffed satellite of the B complex. Key parameters of the installations and platforms are given in the table.

Halfdan Installations
	Halfdan A			Halfdan B				Halfdan C
Block	5505/13			5505/13				5505/13
Name	HDA	HDB	HDC	HBA	HBB	HBC	HBD	HCA
Coordinates	55.230115N 5.005754E			55.537992N 5.030886E				55.557225N 5.134502E
Water depth, m	43	43	43	43	43	43	43	45
Commissioned	2000	2003	2003	2002	2008	2007	2011	2008
Type	Fixed steel	Fixed steel	Fixed steel	Fixed steel	Fixed steel	Fixed steel	Fixed steel	Fixed steel
Function	Wellhead, processing	Accommodation 32 beds	Flare	Wellhead, separation	Riser, wellhead	Accommodation 80 beds	Processing	Wellhead, separation
Wells	35			37				9
Bridges	2: each about 100 metre			3: 100 to 140 metre				0
Substructure weight, t	2800	1000	1150	3050	1800	2000	3500	1100
Topside weight, t	800	2200	500	2500	1380	3000	9300	630
Wells	35			37				9

=== Pipelines ===
In addition to the offshore installations there are a number of pipelines connecting and transferring fluids within the Halfdan field and to adjacent fields which act as oil and gas export routes.

Halfdan and connected pipelines
From	To	Fluid	Length, km	Diameter, inches	Note
HDA	HBA	Gas, oil, water	1.7	12	
HBA	HDA	Gas, oil, water	1.7	14	
HBA	Dan	Gas, oil, water	11	20	
Dan	HDA	Injection water	9	14	
HDC	HBA	Gas	2	24	
HCA	HBB	Gas	7	16	
HCA	HBB	Oil	7	8	
HDA	Dan	HP Gas	9	12	
HDA	Dan	LP Gas	9	12	
HDA	Gorm	Oil & condensate	19	14	Oil export route to shore
HBA	Tyra West	Gas	27	24	Gas export route to shore

Halfdan A and B have their own power supplies but are also interconnected. Halfdan C receives power from Halfdan B complex.

== Oil and gas production ==
Oil and gas from the reservoir are produced via a number of wells. In addition water injection is used to sweep oil towards the oil production wells.

=== Wells ===
- Oil production wells: 38 (Halfdan)
- Gas production wells: 16 (Sif and Igor)
- Water injection wells: 27 (Halfdan)

=== Plant capacity ===
- The capacity of the plant on Halfdan A is: Oil 120,000 BOPD; Gas 120 MMSCFD; Produced water 115,000 BWPD.
- The capacity of the plant on Halfdan B is: Oil 90,000 BOPD; Gas 125 MMSCFD; Produced water 180,000 BWPD.

=== Annual production and injection ===
Halfdan annual oil, gas and water production and water injection 1999-2013
Year	1999	2000	2001	2002	2003	2004	2005	2006	2007	2008	2009	2010	2011	2012	2013
Oil production, 1000 m^{3}	222	1120	2365	3718	4352	4346	6000	6085	5785	5326	5465	5119	4905	4617	4150
Gas production, million normal m^{3}	37	178	522	759	1142	1449	2582	2948	2675	3104	3401	2885	2343	1709	1389
Produced water, 1000 m^{3}	56	237	493	367	612	2099	2825	3460	4086	4766	4814	5519	6149	6139	6099
Water injection, 1000 m^{3}	62	13	649	2532	5162	5759	9710	11026	12107	12727	11485	11945	12277	10912	10921

Halfdan annual oil, gas and water production and water injection 2014-22
Year	2014	2015	2016	2017	2018	2019	2020	2021	2022
Oil production, 1000 m^{3}	3674	3345	2780	2700	2385	2084	1733	1498	1433
Gas production, million normal m^{3}	1309	1334	1191	1209	1203	1008	924	844	808
Produced water, 1000 m^{3}	6574	7344	6709	7315	7190	7421	6879	6858	7452
Water injection, 1000 m^{3}	11403	10760	8555	10032	8316	8823	8957	8716	8513

== Future plans ==
Plans for future development of the field include: the Halfdan Ekofisk infills; HCA gas lift; Halfdan Tor NE infill; and Halfdan Northeast project.

It has been estimated that the field will remain economically viable until 2035.

== See also ==
- Skjold oil field
- Gorm Field
- Tyra field
- Dan oil field
- Siri, Nini and Cecilie oil fields
- Valdemar oil and gas field
- South Arne oil and gas field
- Harald gas field
- Ravn oil field
