= Ravn oil field =

Danish oil field in the North Sea

- Country: Denmark
- Region: North Sea
- Location/block: 5504
- Offshore/onshore: Offshore
- Coordinates: 55°52'55"N 4°00'11"E
- Operators: Wintershall Noodzee
- Owner: Wintershall Noordzee (63.6%), Nordsofonden (36.4%).

Field history
- Discovery: 1986
- Start of production: 2017
- Abandonment: 2020

Production
- Recoverable oil: 9.08 million barrels (~1.24×10^{6} t)
- Recoverable gas: 0.012×10^{9} m^{3} (0.42×10^{9} cu ft)
- Producing formations: Sandstone

Ravn is a marginal oil field in the Danish sector of the North Sea. It started operating in 2017, with oil exported to an installation in the German sector of the North Sea. Operations were suspended in 2020, and decommissioning is currently being planned.

== The field ==
The characteristics of the Ravn field reservoir are as follows.

| Field | Ravn |
| Reservoir | Heno sandstone |
| Geological age | Upper Jurassic |
| Offshore Block | 5504 |
| Reservoir depth | 4,200 m |
| Field delineation | 333 km^{2} |
| Reserves | 9.08 million barrels of oil equivalent |
| Discovered | 1986 |

== Owner and operator ==
Wintershall Noordzee (63.6%), Nordsofonden (36.4%). Wintershall Noodzee (operator).

== Infrastructure ==
The field was developed through a single offshore installation platform.

Ravn installation
| Name | Ravn |
| Coordinates | 55.881867°N 4.002991°E |
| Production start | 2017 |
| Water depth | 48 |
| Installation | 4-legged jacket |
| Access | Helicopter, normally unmanned |
| Function | Wellheads |
| Number of wells | 2 |
| Substructure weight tonnes | 1,132 |
| Topsides weight tonnes | 637 |
| Export | 18 km 8-inch multi-phase pipeline to platform A6-A in German sector |
| Import | 18 km 3-inch lift gas from A6-A |

== Production ==
The oil and gas production profile of the Ravn field is as shown in the table.

Ravn annual oil production (1000 m^{3}) and gas production (million Normal m^{3}) 2017-2022

| Year | 2017 | 2018 | 2019 | 2020 | 2021 | 2022 | Total |
| Oil | 32 | 89 | 88 | 16 | 0 | 0 | 225 |
| Gas | 2 | 5 | 6 | 0 | 0 | 0 | 12 |

== Decommissionimg ==
Operations were suspended in 2020, and decommissioning is currently (2023) being planned.

== See also ==
- Gorm Field
- Tyra field
- Dan oil field
- Halfdan field
- Siri, Nini and Cecilie oil fields
- Valdemar oil and gas field
- Skjold oil field
- South Arne oil and gas field
- Harald gas field
