= Gorm Field =

Natural gas and oilfield in the North Sea

Gorm
- Location within North Sea
- Country: Denmark
- Region: North Sea
- Block: 5504/15; 5504/16
- Offshore/onshore: Offshore
- Coordinates: 55°34′N 4°47′E
- Operator: TotalEnergies

Field history
- Discovery: 1971
- Start of production: 1981

Production
- Producing formations: Danian and Upper Cretaceous chalk

Gorm is a natural gas and oilfield in the Danish Sector of the North Sea. It was discovered in 1971 and is the largest oilfield exploited by Denmark. The production infrastructure consists of five bridge-linked platforms and is operated by BlueNord. The facilities include two wellhead platforms and several processing platforms. The Rolf and Dagmar fields are satellites to Gorm.

== Reservoir ==
The reservoir properties of the Gorm field are as shown.

Properties of Gorm reservoir
Property	Value
Block	5504/16
Production horizon	Upper cretaceous Danian chalk
Field delineation, km^{2}	63
Reservoir depth, feet	6,600 to 7,200
Hydrocarbon column, feet	500
Density °API	33.5
Gas / oil ratio	1789
Sulphur content %	0.2
Porosity %	27-35
Total reserves oil, million barrels	110-600
Total reserves gas, billion cubic feet	353

== Infrastructure ==
=== Installations ===
The installations developed for the Gorm field were as follows. The water depth at the site is 39 metres.

Gorm field installations
Platforms	Coordinates	Function	Type	Legs	Substructure weight, t	Topsides weight, t	Well slots	Installed	Production start	Production to
Gorm A	55.579105N 4.757856E	Drilling & wellhead	Steel jacket	4	1080	1100	9	September 1979	May 1981	Gorm C
Gorm B	55.578531N 4.757625E	Drilling & wellhead	Steel jacket	4	1080	945	9	December 1979	March 1982	Gorm C
Gorm C	55.579641N 4.758695E	Processing & accommodation (97 beds)	Steel jacket	8	3500	10,200	–	July 1980	May 1981	Gorm E
Gorm D	55.579041N 4.750050E	Flare tower	Steel jacket	3	750	220	–	February 1981	–	
Gorm E (owned by DONG oil pipe A/S)	55.580749N 4.759857E	Riser and pumping	Steel jacket	4	1634	3900	–	April May 1982		Gas to Tyra (14 inch pipeline), condensate to onshore (20 inch pipeline)
Gorm F	55.578398N 4.757050E	Well head, processing	Steel jacket		2000	11000		1991		

In 2014 there were 32 oil production wells, one gas injection well, and 14 water injection wells.

=== Pipelines ===
A number of pipelines transport fluids to and from the Gorm field. The Skjold, Rolf and Dagmar fields are satellites of Gorn

Gorm field pipelines
From	To	Fluid	Length, km	Diameter, inches	Note
Skjold B	Gorm F	Oil, gas & water	12	12	
Skjold A	Gorm A	Oil, gas & water	11	12	
Rolf	Gorm E	Oil, gas & water	17	8	
Dagmar	Gorm F	Oil, gas & water	9	8	
Gorm E	Rolf	Gas	17	3	
Gorm F	Skjold A	Injection water	12	12	
Gorm D	Skjold A	Gas	11	6	
Gorm E	Tyra E	Gas	16	18	
Gorm E	Fredericia shore terminal	Oil	330	20	Capacity = 270,000 barrels per day
Gorm E	CALM (see note)	Oil		12	Decommissioned
Gorm E	CALM	Oil		12	Decommissioned

Note. CALM = Catenary Anchor Leg Mooring; buoys used to load ships with oil before the export pipeline was available.

== Production ==
The original design production rate for the process facilities on Gorm C was 60,000 barrels of oil per day (bopd). The design gas injection rate was 84 mmscfd (million standard cubic feet per day). The pumping platform Gorm C had a design throughput of 90,000 bopd.

The production strategy is to maintain reservoir pressure through water injection.

The production data for the Gorm field is shown in the following table. Production and injection numbers are cumulative rates up to 1 January 2014. About 400 barrels per day (64 m^{3}/d) of crude oil from the nearby Rolf oil field are processed on the Gorm platforms.

Gorm field production
Parameter	Value
Oil production wells	32
Gas injection wells	1
Water injection wells	14
Oil production, million m^{3}	60.79
Gas production, billion Nm^{3}	15.74
Produced water, million m^{3}	80.35
Water injection, million m^{3}	137.83
Gas injection, billion Nm^{3}	8.16
Oil reserves, million m^{3}	3.0
Gas reserved, billion Nm^{3}	0.3

In 2014 the annual production was 6.3 million barrels of oil and 3,677 million standard cubic feet of gas (104 million m^{3} gas).

== Incidents ==
An oil leak occurred in the field on 2 March 2011.

== Dagmar and Rolf fields ==
The Dagmar and Rolf fields are satellites to the Gorm installations. The characteristics of the fields are as follows.

Dagmar and Rolf fields
Field	Dagmar	Rolf
Prospect	East Rosa	Mid Rosa
Reservoir	Chalk and Dolomite	Chalk
Geological age	Danian, Upper Cretaceous and Zechstein	Danian and Upper Cretaceous
Coordinates	55.576474°N 4.618248°E	55.605986°N 4.491481°E
Block	5504/15	5504/14 & 15
Reservoir depth	1,400 m	1,800 m
Field delineation	50 km^{2}	22 km^{2}
Reserves		
Discovered	1983	1981

The fields are developed through two offshore installations as shown.

Dagmar and Rolf installations
Field	Dagmar	Rolf
Production start	1991	1986
Water depth	34 m	40 m
Installation	Fixed steel no helideck	Fixed steel
Function	Wellheads no processing	Wellheads no processing
Substructure weight tonnes	500	1,400
Topsides weight tonnes	532	1,900
Number of wells	2	3
Status	Shut in 2006 & 2007	Producing (2022)
Export, well fluids	9 km 8-inch pipeline to Gorm F	17 km 8-inch pipeline to Gorm E
Import, lift gas	-	17 km 3-inch pipeline from Gorm E

The oil production profile of the Dagmar and Rolf fields (in 1000 cubic metres) is as shown.

Rolf and Dagmar annual oil production (1000 m^{3}) 1986-2004
Year	1986	1987	1988	1989	1990	1991	1992	1993	1994	1995	1996	1997	1998	1999	2000	2001	2002	2003	2004
Rolf	469	634	396	395	271	293	304	176	100	130	113	96	92	77	83	51	51	104	107
Dagmar						475	305	67	33	35	23	17	13	10	8	4	6	7	2

Rolf and Dagmar annual oil production (1000 m^{3}) 2005-2022
Year	2005	2006	2007	2008	2009	2010	2011	2012	2013	2014	2015	2016	2017	2018	2019	2020	2021	2022	Total
Rolf	79	89	103	78	76	60	1				78	75	54	47	58	45	45	48	4876
Dagmar	0			0															1005

== See also ==
- Tyra field
- Dan oil field
- Skjold oil field
- Halfdan field
- Siri, Nini and Cecilie oil fields
- Valdemar oil and gas field
- South Arne oil and gas field
- Harald gas field
- Ravn oil field
