= M.E.S. Indian School =

Coordinates: 25°14′8.7″N 51°30′21.3″E

M. E. S. Indian School
- Abu Hamour; Doha; Qatar

Information
- Type: Private school
- Motto: Rabbi Zidni Ilman (O' Lord Advance me in knowledge)
- Established: 1974; 52 years ago
- School board: Central Board of Secondary Education
- Oversight: Middle-East Educational Services
- President: B. M. Sidhique
- Principal: Hameeda Kadar
- Gender: Co-educational
- Age range: 4–19
- Publication: The Clarion
- Website: mesqatar.org

M. E. S. Indian School is an English medium private school for boys and girls in Doha, Qatar that was established in 1974. It is one of the first schools to be established in Qatar. It is affiliated to the Central Board of Secondary Education (CBSE) and follows the latest curriculum from the CBSE.

== MES Indian School - Abu Hamour ==
The Abu Hamour branch of M.E.S Indian School, located in Doha, Qatar, is an extension of the institution.
