= Dan oil field =

North Sea oil field

- Country: Denmark
- Location/blocks: 7.3
- Location: Danish sector North Sea
- Offshore/onshore: Offshore
- Operator: Maersk Oil

Field history
- Discovery: 1971
- Start of development: 1971
- Start of production: 1972
- Peak of production: 10,000 bopd
- Peak year: 1977

Production
- Peak of production (oil): 10,000 barrels per day (~5.1×10^{5} t/a)
- Estimated oil in place: 125 million barrels (~1.74×10^{7} t)
- Recoverable gas: 1,200×10^{9} cu ft (34×10^{9} m^{3})
- Producing formations: Upper Cretaceous chalk

The Dan oil field is a large oil and associated gas field in the Danish sector of the North Sea, about 200 kilometres (120 miles) west of Esbjerg. Oil and gas are produced through a complex of offshore installations. The Kraka and Regnar fields are satellites to the Dan installations.

== The field ==
The Dan field was discovered in May 1971 by the Britannia oil rig in Denmark Block 7.3 of the North Sea. The reservoir is an Upper Cretaceous Danian chalk at a depth of 5,800 to 6,400 feet (1,768 to 1,951 metres). The oil has an API gravity of 30.4 and a gas oil ratio of 600 standard cubic feet per barrel (scf/bbl). The estimated recoverable reserves are 90–125 million barrels (14.3–19.9 million cubic metres) of oil and 1.2–1.3 trillion cubic feet (34–37 billion cubic metres) of gas.

== Development ==
The field was developed in phases through multi-platform installations, summarized as follows:

Dan field installations
Platform	Function	Configuration	Type	Legs	Well slots	Installed	Production start	Production to
Dan A	Wellhead drilling	Bridge linked	Steel Jacket	4	6	September 1971	July 1972	Dan B
Dan B	Processing	Bridge linked	Steel Jacket	4	–	1972	July 1972	Oil to Gorm C; Gas to Tyra
Dan C	Separator and Flare	Bridge linked	Steel Jacket	3	–	1972	July 1972	–
Dan D	Wellhead drilling	Bridge linked	Steel Jacket	4	6	March 1975	1976	Dan B
Dan E	Wellhead drilling	Stand alone	Steel Jacket	4	6	April 1976	1977	Dan B (pipeline)
Dan FA	Wellhead drilling	Bridge linked	Steel Jacket				1986	Dan FC
Dan FB	Wellhead drilling	Bridge linked	Steel Jacket				1986	Dan FC
Dan FC	Processing	Bridge linked	Steel Jacket		–		1986	Oil to Tyra; gas to Gorm
Dan FD	Flare	Bridge linked	Steel Jacket		–	1992		–
Dan FE	Wellhead	Bridge linked						Dan FC
Dan FF	Wellhead and processing	Bridge linked	Steel Jacket					
Dan FG	Processing	Bridge linked	Steel Jacket		–	2004		

Production of condensate (in 1000s of barrels)

== Kraka and Regnar fields ==
The Kraka and Regnar fields are satellites to the Dan installation. The characteristics of the fields are as follows.

Kraka and Regnar fields
Field	Kraka	Regnar
Prospect	Anne	Nils
Reservoir	Chalk	Chalk
Geological age	Danian and Upper Cretaceous	Upper Cretaceous
Coordinates	55.402045°N 5.078377°E	55.385323°N 4.288464°E
Block	5505/17	5505/17
Reservoir depth	1,800 m	1,700 m
Field delineation	81 km^{2}	34 km^{2}
Reserves		
Discovered	1966	1979

The fields are developed through two offshore installations as shown.

Kraka and Regnar field Installations
Field	Kraka	Regnar
Production start	1991	1993
Water depth	45 m	45 m
Installation	Fixed steel no helideck	Subsea steel
Function	Wellheads no processing	Wellhead no processing
Substructure weight tonnes	550	50
Topsides weight tonnes	400	-
Number of wells	8	1
Status	Producing (2022)	No production since 2006
Export, well fluids	9 km 8-inch pipeline to Dan FA	13 km 8-inch pipeline to Dan FA
Import, lift gas	9 km 3-inch pipeline from Dan FA	-

The oil production profile of the Kraka and Regnar fields (in 1000 cubic metres) is as shown.

Kraka and Regnar annual oil production (1000 m^{3}) 1991-2007
Year	1991	1992	1993	1994	1995	1996	1997	1998	1999	2000	2001	2002	2003	2004	2005	2006	2007
Kraka	144	205	390	491	469	340	315	314	404	350	253	157	139	199	211	222	176
Regnar			145	429	86	41	27	43	29	14	33	18	19	19	16	11	0

Kraka and Regnar annual oil production (1000 m^{3}) 2008-2022
Year	2008	2009	2010	2011	2012	2013	2014	2015	2016	2017	2018	2019	2020	2021	2022	Total
Kraka	112	37	67	170	129	101	89	146	116	113	108	104	115	145	79	6,407
Regnar																930

== See also ==
- Tyra Field
- Gorm Field
- Halfdan field
- Skjold oil field
- Siri, Nini and Cecilie oil fields
- Valdemar oil and gas field
- South Arne oil and gas field
- Harald gas field
- Ravn oil field
