= Industries Qatar =

Qatari conglomerate

Industries Qatar Q.S.C.
- Company type: Public
- Traded as: QE: IQCD
- Industry: Petrochemicals; Fertilisers; Steel
- Founded: 3 August 2003; 22 years ago
- Headquarters: Al Dafna, Doha, Qatar
- Key people: Saad Sherida al-Kaabi (chairman & Managing Director)
- Revenue: ▲QR5,970 million (2014)
- Net income: ▼QR6,342 million (2014)
- Total assets: ▼QR36,556 million (2014)
- Total equity: ▼QR33,585 million (2014)
- Parent: QatarEnergy (51%)
- Subsidiaries: Qatar Steel Q.S.C.; Qatar Petrochemical Company Limited Q.S.C. (80%); Qatar Fuel Additives Company Limited Q.S.C. (50%); Qatar Fertiliser Company S.A.Q. (75%)
- Website: www.iq.com.qa

Industries Qatar Q.S.C. (Arabic: صناعات قطر; IQ) is a Qatari conglomerate with subsidiaries and investments in the petrochemicals, fertilisers and steel industries. IQ is a 51% subsidiary of QatarEnergy. Its shares are traded on the Qatar Exchange and is one of the largest publicly traded companies in Qatar by market capitalisation.

The company's principal investments are Qatar Petrochemical Company (QAPCO) (an 80:20 joint venture with TotalEnergies), Qatar Fuel Additives Company (QAFAC) (50% owned, with the remaining shares held by OPIC, International Octane and Taiwan-based LCY Group), Qatar Fertiliser Company (QAFCO) (a 75:25 joint venture with Yara), and Qatar Steel.

== History ==
QAFCO was established in 1969 as a joint venture between the government of Qatar, Norsk Hydro, Davy Power and Hambros Bank to produce ammonia and urea in Qatar. QAPCO and QAFAC were founded in 1974 and 1991 respectively. By 2003, these three companies were held by Qatar Petroleum (QP) while Qatar Steel remained directly owned by the state. In that year, Qatar Steel was transferred to QP. QP subsequently transferred Qatar Steel, along with QAFCO, QAPCO and QAFAC into Industries Qatar, which was then listed on the Qatar Exchange.

Industries Qatar was ranked 37th on Forbes Middle East's Top 100 Listed Companies 2025 list.
