= Valdemar oil and gas field =

Danish oil field in the North Sea

- Country: Denmark
- Region: North Sea
- Location/blocks: 5504/7 and 11
- Offshore/onshore: Offshore
- Coordinates: 55.833765°N 4.561945°
- Operator: Total E&P Denmark
- Owner: TotalEnergies, BlueNord and Nordsofonden

Field history
- Discovery: 1977 Bo; 1985 North Jens
- Start of production: 1993
- Peak of production: 2009

Production
- Producing formations: chalk

The Valdemar oil and gas field is a crude oil and gas production field in the Danish sector of the central North Sea. Production of oil and gas started in 1993, peak oil was achieved in 2009 and peak gas in 2010. Production was suspended in 2019.

== The field ==
The Valdemar oil and gas field is a crude oil and associated gas production field in Blocks 5504/7 and 5504/11 of the Danish sector of the central North Sea. The characteristics of the field reservoir are as follows.

Valdemar field characteristics
Field	Valdemar
Prospect	Bo / North Jens
Reservoir	Chalk
Geological age	Danian, Upper and Lower Cretaceous
Block	5504/7 and 11
Reservoir depth	2,000 m Upper Cretaceous 2,600 m Lower Cretaceous
Field delineation	110 km^{2}
Reserves	Oil 5.9 million m^{3} Gas 2.6 billion Nm^{3}
Discovered	1977 Bo; 1985 North Jens

== Owners and operator ==
The field is jointly owned by TotalEnergies, BlueNord and Nordsofonden.

The field is operated by Total E&P Denmark.

== Infrastructure ==
The field was developed through two offshore installations comprising three platforms as shown.

Name	AA (VAA)	AB (VAB)	BA (VBA)
Prospect	North Jens	North Jens	Bo
Coordinates	55.834308°N 4.561462°E	55.833765°N 4.561945°E	55.804055°N 4.564279°E
Production start	1993	2006	2007
Water depth	43 m	43 m	43 m
Bridge	Bridge link AA to AB		-
Installation	Fixed steel STAR (slim tripod adapted for rig installation) no helideck	Fixed steel STAR no helideck	Fixed steel STAR no helideck
Function	Wellheads	Wellheads, separation	Wellheads
Substructure weight tonnes	650	1,400	1,400
Topsides weight tonnes	453	480	460
Number of wells	21 oil, 2 gas across field		
Status	No production since 2019	No production since 2019	No production since 2019
Export, liquids		20 km pipeline to Tyra East	18 km 16-inch multiphase pipeline to Tyra East via Roar
Export, gas	19 km 12-inch pipeline to Tyra West		
Import, chemicals		From Tyra East	

== Production ==
Production from the Valdemar field was by natural depletion. The oil and gas production profile of the Valdemar field is as shown.

Valdemar annual oil production (1000 m^{3}) and gas production (million Normal m^{3}) 1993-2007
Year	1993	1994	1995	1996	1997	1998	1999	2000	2001	2002	2003	2004	2005	2006	2007
Oil	53	304	166	161	159	95	86	77	181	353	435	491	423	470	881
Gas	29	96	52	57	89	54	49	55	78	109	151	218	208	208	355

Valdemar annual oil production (1000 m^{3}) and gas production (million Normal m^{3}) 2008-2022
Year	2008	2009	2010	2011	2012	2013	2014	2015	2016	2017	2018	2019	2020	2021	2022	Total
Oil	1,268	1,410	909	817	844	777	762	637	716	685	564	391				14,115
Gas	593	510	791	579	515	368	343	291	325	312	267	203				6,905

== See also ==
- Gorm Field
- Tyra field
- Dan oil field
- Halfdan field
- Siri, Nini and Cecilie oil fields
- Skjold oil field
- South Arne oil and gas field
- Harald gas field
- Ravn oil field
