= Siri, Nini and Cecilie oil fields =

Danish oil field in the North Sea

Siri oil field
- Country: Denmark
- Region: North Sea
- Blocks: 5604/20
- Offshore/onshore: Offshore
- Coordinates: 56.482686N 4.911144E
- Operators: DONG E & P A/S

Field history
- Discovery: 1995
- Start of production: 1999
- Peak of production: 2.188 million cubic metres per year
- Peak year: 2000

Production
- Producing formations: Paleocene sandstone structural trap

The Siri oil field and its satellites, Nini and Cecille, are oil producing fields in the Danish sector of the southern North Sea. Operating since 1999 and 2003 they are the most northerly of Denmark's offshore oil assets located close to the Denmark-Norway median line.

== The fields ==
The Siri field comprises a sandstone reservoir of oil with a low gas content. It is in Block 5604/20 in the far north of the Danish sector near the Denmark-Norway median line. The Siri reservoir comprises four areas: Siri Central; Siri North; to the north east Stine segment 2; and Stine segment 1. The field is developed through a single installation (designated SCA) located over the Siri Central formation with subsea wells exploiting Stine1 & 2.

The Nini field is to the north east of the Siri field and is a sandstone oil reservoir. It has been developed through two platforms (Nini A and Nini B also known as Nini East and Nini West) with well fluids piped to Siri SCA installation for processing.

The Cecilie field is located south west of the Siri field, it too is a sandstone oil reservoir. It has been developed by a wellhead platform with well fluids routed to Siri SCA for processing.

Key parameters of the fields are given in the table.

Siri, Nini and Cecilie fields properties
Field	Siri	Nini	Cecille
Reservoir rock	Sandstone	Sandstome	Sandstone
Trap	Structural trap	Structural and stratigraphic trap	Structural and stratigraphic trap
Geological age	Paleocene	Eocene/Paleocene	Paleocene
Depth	2060 m	1700 m	2200 m
Discovery	1995	2000	2000
Field delineation	63 km^{2}	45 km^{2}	23 km^{2}
Oil reserves	1.1 million m^{3}	1.1 million m^{3}	0.2 million m^{3}
Gas reserves	0	0	0

== Owners and operators ==
The licence for the Siri field was originally owned by Dong Energy (50%), Altinex (20%) and Talisman (30%). The operator licence was taken over by Dong Energy from Statoil in 2002. The Siri, Nini and Cecilie fields are currently owned and operated by DONG E & P A/S.

== Production infrastructure ==
The fields have been exploited by several subsea and topside installations, as shown in the table.

Siri, Nini and Cecilie installations
Name	Siri (SCA)	Stine SCB-1	Stine SCB-2	Nini A (Nini West)	Nini B (Nini East)	Cecilie
Block	5604/20	5604/20	5604/20	5605/10 & 14	5605/10 & 14	5604/19 & 20
Coordinates	56.482686°N 4.911144°E	56.505947N 5.040943E		56.640805N 5.321124E	56.674771N 5.412430E	56.402115N 4.759621E
Water depth, m	60	60	60	60	60	60
Commissioned	1999	2004		2003	2010	2003
Type	Fixed steel	Subsea	Subsea	Fixed steel	Fixed steel	Fixed steel
Function	Wellheads, processing, accommodation (60 beds)	Wellhead	Wellhead	Wellheads	Wellheads	Wellheads
Wells, production	6	1	1	8		3 oil, 1 gas
Wells, injection	2	1	0	6		0
Substructure weight, tonnes	2000	160		2000	2000	2000
Topside weight, tonnes	8000	0		700	700	700

The Siri, Nini and Cecilie fields are stranded assets remote from export infrastructure such as pipelines. Oil from SCA is routed to a 50,000 m^{3} storage tank on the seabed. The tank is 50 m x 66 m and 17.5 m high. It is emptied periodically by tanker via a Single Anchor Loading (SAL) buoy mooring system.

=== Pipelines ===
In addition to the offshore installations there are a number of pipelines connecting and transferring fluids within the fields

Siri, Nini and Cecilie and connected pipelines
From	To	Fluid	Length, km	Diameter, inches	Note
SCB-1	SCA	Well fluids	9	8	
SCB-1	SBC-2	Injection water	adjacent		
SCA	SCB-1	Lift gas	9	3	
SCA	SAL	Crude oil		16	
Nini B	Nini A	Well fluids	7	8	
Nini A	SCA	Well fluids	32	14	
Cecilie	SCA	Well fluids	13	12	
SCA	Nini A	Injection water	32	10	
Nini A	Nini B	Injection water	7	10	
SCA	Nini A	Lift gas	32	4	
Nini A	Nini B	Lift gas	7	4	
SCA	Cecilie	Lift gas	13	4	
SCA	Cecilie	Injection water	13	10	

== Oil production ==
The oil produced across the fields is shown in the tables.

Siri, Nini and Cecilie oil production (1000 m^{3}) 1999-2010
	1999	2000	2001	2002	2003	2004	2005	2006	2007	2008	2009	2010
Siri	1,593	2,118	1,761	1,487	925	693	703	595	508	598	326	286
Cecilie	0	0	0	0	166	310	183	116	88	66	38	33
Nini	0	0	0	0	391	1,477	624	377	323	355	159	544

Siri, Nini and Cecilie oil production (1000 m^{3}) 2011-22
	2011	2012	2013	2014	2015	2016	2017	2018	2019	2020	2021	2022
Siri	161	232	131	94	200	206	189	162	124	79	60	53
Cecilie	39	32	17	10	23	39	32	31	28	25	23	23
Mini	569	454	268	336	299	310	208	141	117	89	83	75

Water and recovered gas are co-injected into the Siri and Nini reservoirs to increase oil recovery. An average of 2.98 million m^{3} of water per year is injected.

== The future ==
The Project Greensand consortium has identified the Nini West subsea reservoir as a feasible carbon dioxide (CO_{2}) storage facility. The reservoir is suitable for injecting 0.45 million tonnes CO_{2} per year per well for a 10-year period and that it can safely contain the CO_{2} in compressed form. If successful the project could be extended to the whole Siri field. Work on the project is ongoing.

== See also ==
- Skjold oil field
- Gorm Field
- Tyra field
- Dan oil field
- Halfdan field
- Valdemar oil and gas field
- South Arne oil and gas field
- Harald gas field
- Ravn oil field
