= Woqod =

Oil and gas company of Qatar

Qatar Fuel Company (WOQOD) Q.P.S.C.
- Company type: Public
- Traded as: QE: QFLS
- Industry: Oil and gas
- Founded: 2002
- Headquarters: Doha, Qatar
- Area served: Qatar
- Key people: Saad Rashid Al Muhannadi (CEO)
- Products: Fuels
- Services: Retail sale Wholesale
- Website: www.woqod.com

Qatar Fuel Company Q.P.S.C., d/b/a WOQOD, is a Qatari oil and gas company focused on the distribution and sale of refined petroleum products supplied by QatarEnergy. It is the only fuel retailer in Qatar and is publicly listed on the Qatar Stock Exchange. As of Jan 2022, the company maintained 112 filling stations throughout the country. Aside from filling stations, the company operates vehicle workshops, tire stations and convenience stores. The company also has numerous subsidiaries.

== History ==
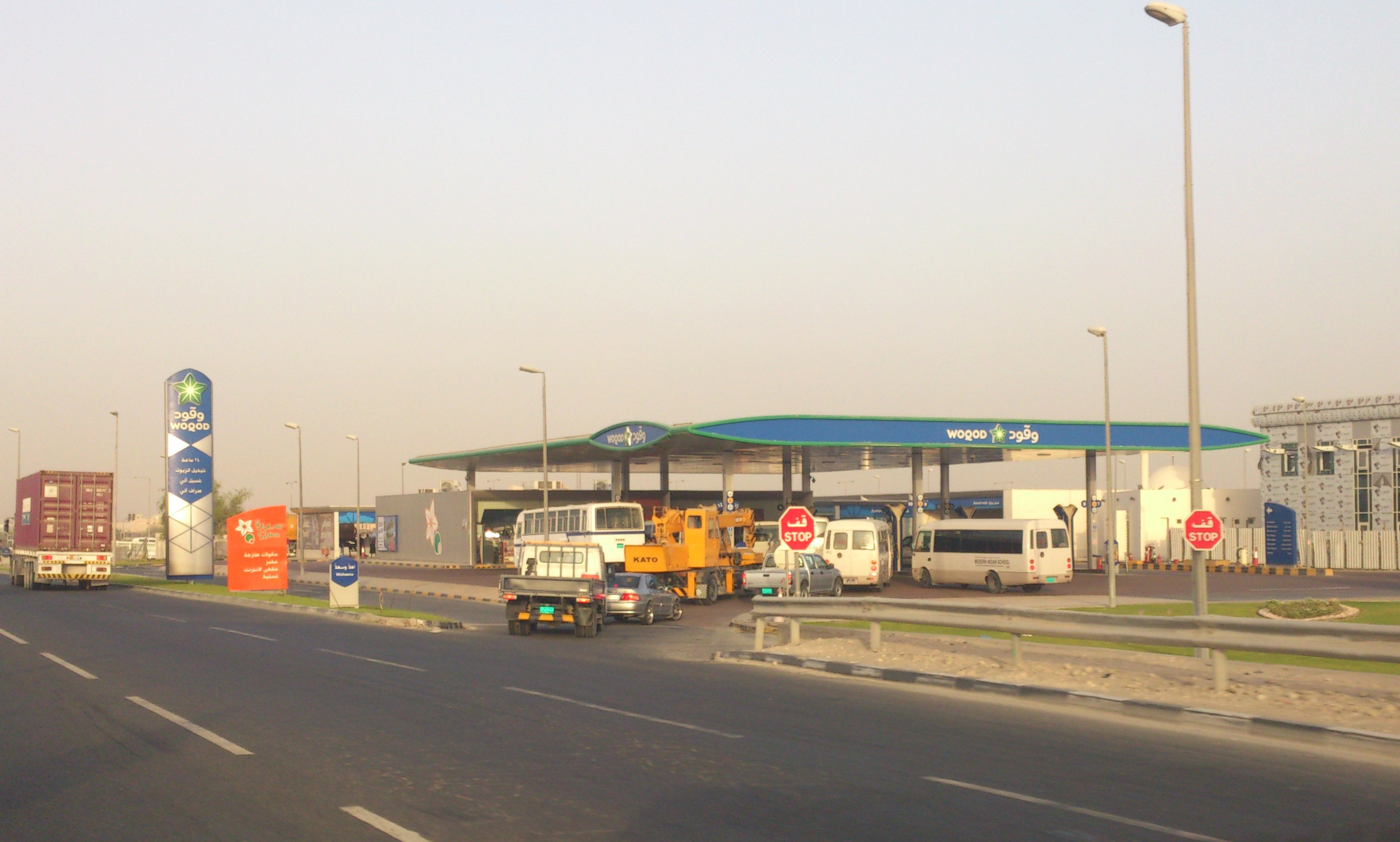
A WOQOD filling station in Al Mamoura

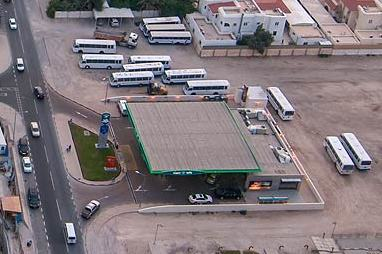
Aerial view of a WOQOD filling station in Onaiza

Qatar Fuel was formally created by virtue of Emiri decree no. 5 issued on 10 February 2002. Its assets were transferred from QatarEnergy's subsidiary National Oil Distribution Company (NODCO), which managed a refined petroleum product supply depot in Abu Hamour. In 2009, Qatar Fuel established a liquefied petroleum gas plant in Doha's Industrial Area.

During an Extraordinary General Assembly held in June 2018, the company made the decision to increase non-Qatari ownership to 49% in order to attract investments. A budget of QR 634 million was allocated for 2018 to be earmarked for the construction of new filling stations and the development of currently existing ones. According to company officials, plans are in place to install 88 filling stations by the end of 2018 with a total of 100 by 2020.

== Shipping ==
The company is involved in shipping bitumen. In 2014, the company reached an agreement with Ashghal (The Public Works Authority) to import 130,000 tonnes to be used in construction works. At the time the agreement was reached, Qatar Fuel had two bitumen tankers, with an additional $6 million ship being purchased in November 2014.

== Sidra stores ==
Beginning in 2006, Qatar Fuel has opened several convenience stores under the name Sidra. The company maintains upwards of 30 Sidra convenience stores, the majority of which are associated with filling stations. In 2014, following a general assembly meeting, it was announced that Qatar Fuel had begun the process of upgrading all of its Sidra stores into supermarkets.

== Subsidiaries ==
Among the company's subsidiaries are Qatar Jet Fuel Company (Q-JET), WOQOD Vehicle Inspection (FAHES), WOQOD Marine Services and WOQOD International for Foreign Investment.

=== FAHES ===
Qatar Fuel operates vehicle inspection centers under its FAHES brand. Vehicle inspection services were initially offered since 2003 at the FAHES center in the Industrial Area of Doha. The first FAHES center outside the Industrial Area was opened in Wadi Al Banat in December 2014, with the second center coming in January 2015 in Mesaimeer.
