= Harald gas field =

Oil field located in Denmark

- Country: Denmark
- Region: North Sea
- Location/block: 5604/21 & 22
- Offshore/onshore: Offshore
- Coordinates: 56.345239°N 4.272022°E
- Operator: Maersk, TotalEnergies EP Danmark, Maersk Oll og Gas A/S
- Owner: Maersk, TotalEnergies EP Danmark, Maersk Oll og Gas A/S

Field history
- Discovery: 1980 (Lulu); 1983 (West Lulu)
- Start of production: 1997

Production
- Current production of gas: 1.69×10^{9} m^{3}/a (60×10^{9} cu ft/a)
- Year of current production of gas: 1998
- Producing formations: Chalk (Harald East); Sandstone (Harald West)

The Harald field is a gas and associated condensate production field in the Danish sector of the central North Sea. Production of gas and liquids started in 1997, and peak gas was in 1998. The Lulita field is a satellite of the Harald field.

== The field ==
The characteristics of the Harald field reservoir are as follows.

Field	Harald
Prospect	Lulu and West Lulu
Reservoir	Chalk (Harald East); Sandstone (Harald West)
Geological age	Danian and Upper Cretaceous (Harald East); Middle Jurassic (Harald West)
Offshore Block	5604/21 & 22
Reservoir depth	2,700 m (Harald East); 2,650 m (Harald West)
Reservoir thickness	75 m (Harald East); 100 m (Harald West)
Field delineation	56 km^{2}
Reserves	Gas: 23.9 billion Nm^{3;}; Condensate: 0.2 million m^{3}
Discovered	1980 (Lulu); 1983 (West Lulu)

== Owner and operator ==
Maersk, TotalEnergies EP Danmark, Maersk Oil og Gas A/S.

== Infrastructure ==
The field was developed through a single offshore installation comprising two bridge linked platforms.

Harald installations
Name	Harald A	Harald B
Coordinates	56.345239°N 4.272022°E	56.344143°N 4.27192°E
Production start	1997	1997
Water depth	64	64
Installation	Fixed steel	Fixed steel
Access	Bridge to B	Helicopter
Function	Wellhead, processing	Accommodation for 16
Substructure weight tonnes	3800	1700
Topsides weight tonnes	6000	1300
Number of wells	2 (Harald East) 2 (Harald West)	-
Export	Unprocessed condensate and processed gas to Tyra East. There is a connection into the 24-inch South Arne to Nybro gas pipeline	-

== Production ==
An 8-inch multi-phase pipeline transports fluids from the Norwegian Trym gas field to Harald A for processing.

Production of the Harald field is by gas expansion, plus water influx.

Harald acts as the processing facility for the Lulita field.

The gas and condensate production profile of the Harald field is as shown in the tables.

Harald annual condensate production (1000 m^{3}) and gas production (million Normal m^{3}) 1997-2010
Year	1997	1998	1999	2000	2001	2002	2003	2004	2005	2006	2007	2008	2009	2010
Condensate	1,092	2,741	2,876	2,811	2,475	2,019	1,563	1,232	1,091	927	781	690	400	592
Gas	794	1,690	1,332	1,081	866	578	425	314	237	176	139	114	65	70

Harald annual condensate production (1000 m^{3}) and gas production (million Normal m^{3}) 2011-2022
Year	2011	2012	2013	2014	2015	2016	2017	2018	2019	2020	2021	2022	Total
Condensate	573	541	174	274	389	334	276	195	179				24,227
Gas	95	79	25	21	21	24	16	10	8				8,180

== The Lulita field ==
The Lulita field is a satellite of the Harald field. The accumulation is oil with a gas cap, and is a structural fault trap in a Middle Jurassic sandstone. The reservoir is at a depth of 3,525 m, with a field delineation of 4 km^{2}. The field was discovered in 1992 and came onstream in 1998. The production is based on natural depletion. The reservoir is produced through two subsea wells in a water depth of 65 m, flowlines deliver the wellhead fluid to the Harald installation where dedicated equipment produces oil, gas and water streams.

The oil and gas production profile of the Lulita field is as shown in the tables.

Lulita annual oil production (1000 m^{3}) and gas production (million Normal m^{3}) 1998-2010
Year	1998	1999	2000	2001	2002	2003	2004	2005	2006	2007	2008	2009	2010
Oil	143	224	179	66	24	20	19	35	68	55	47	24	36
Gas	69	181	160	27	6	5	5	13	38	33	30	15	18

Lulita annual oil production (1000 m^{3}) and gas production (million Normal m^{3}) 2011-2022
Year	2011	2012	2013	2014	2015	2016	2017	2018	2019	2020	2021	2022	Total
Oil	36	32	17	26	18	31	25	23	24				1,170
Gas	20	19	11	18	11	24	23	16	15				759

== See also ==
- Gorm Field
- Tyra field
- Dan oil field
- Halfdan field
- Siri, Nini and Cecilie oil fields
- Valdemar oil and gas
- Skjold oil field
- South Arne oil and gas field
- Ravn oil field
