= South Arne oil and gas field =

Oil fields located in Denmark

- Country: Denmark
- Region: North Sea
- Location/blocks: 5604/29 &30
- Offshore/onshore: Offshore
- Coordinates: 56.07835°N 4.22886°E
- Operators: Hess (until 2021), Ineos (since 2021)
- Owner: Hess; DONG; Noreco; and Danoil (initially); Ineos (since 2021)

Field history
- Start of production: 1999
- Peak of production: 2,558,000 cubic metres oil/year

Production
- Producing formations: Chalk

The South Arne (Danish: Syd Arne) field is a major crude oil and associated gas production field in the Danish sector of the central North Sea. Production of oil and gas started in 1999, and peak oil and gas was in 2000.

== The field ==
The characteristics of the South Arne field reservoir are as follows.

Field	South Arne
Reservoir	Chalk
Geological age	Danian and Upper Cretaceous
Offshore Block	5604/29 &30
Reservoir depth	2,800 m
Reservoir pressure and temperature	434 bar and 90°C.
Field delineation	93 km^{2}
Reserves	Oil 12.9 million m^{3} Gas 2.6 billion Normal m^{3}
Discovered	1969

== Owners and operators ==
The field was originally owned jointly by Hess 57.48%; DONG 34.58%; Noreco 6.56%; and Danoil 1.58%. It was operated by Hess. In 2021 Hess Denmark sold its interests in South Arne to Ineos E&P for $150 million.

== Infrastructure ==
The field was initially developed through a single offshore installation (SA), two further field installations (WHPE and WHPN) were commissioned in 2013. Details are summarised below.

South Arne installations
Name	South Arne (SA)	WHPE Wellhead platform East (SA WHPE)	WHPN Wellhead platform North (SA WHPN)
Coordinates	56.07835°N 4.22886°E	56.07823°N 4.230876°E	56.09574°N 4.219251°E
Production start	1999	2013	2013
Water depth	60 m	60	60
Installation	Concrete gravity base and steel lattice drilling tower	Fixed steel	Fixed steel
Access	Helicopter	Bridge link to South Arne	Helicopter
Function	Wellhead, process, accommodation (57 beds)	Wellheads	Wellheads
Substructure weight tonnes	112,800	2,224	2,333
Topsides weight tonnes	8,955	1,932	1,762
Number of wells	14 oil production, 7 water injection	12	6
Export, liquids	To subsea oil storage then by single anchor leg mooring (SAL) to tanker	To South Arne	Pipeline Bundle to WHPE (production P/L, lift gas and water injection)
Export, gas	285 km 24-inch pipeline to Nybro	To South Arne	Pipeline Bundle to WHPE (production P/L, lift gas and water injection)

The subsea oil tank has a capacity of 87,000 m^{3} (547,230 barrels). It is 110 m by 90 m by 18 m high. The single anchor leg mooring (SAL) is located 2 km (56.09247°N 4.25615°E) from the South Arne installation.

=== Hejre tie back ===
There are plans to tie-in the Hejre platform into South Arne WHPE. This would be via a 30 km 10-inch or 12-inch multiphase pipeline. South Arne has sufficient capacity to process the Hejre fluids.

== Production ==
Production facilities comprise a single three-stage oil/gas/water separator train capable of processing 50,000 barrels of oil per day (8,065 m^{3}/day), 2 million m^{3} of gas per day, and 100,000 barrels of water per day (16,129 m^{3}/day), The gas compression is a single four-stage train.

Production from the South Arne field is aided by water injection for pressure support. Some produced water is injected into the reservoir, the remainder is treated and discharged overboard. Injection water is treated to remove sulphate ions prior to injection.

The oil and gas production profile of the South Arne field is as shown in the tables.

South Arne annual oil production (1000 m^{3}) and gas production (million Normal m^{3}) 2013-2022
Year	2013	2014	2015	2016	2017	2018	2019	2020	2021	2022	Total
Oil	700	1,023	1,030	946	774	570	565	479	408	347	29,802
Gas	167	238	307	370	281	187	167	132	108	108	7,665

South Arne annual oil production (1000 m^{3}) and gas production (million Normal m^{3}) 1999-2012
Year	1999	2000	2001	2002	2003	2004	2005	2006	2007	2008	2009	2010	2011	2012
Oil	757	2,558	2,031	2,313	2,383	2,257	2,371	1,869	1,245	1,139	1,164	1,066	1,004	803
Gas	167	713	774	681	544	461	485	366	234	225	271	248	238	194

== See also ==
- Gorm Field
- Tyra field
- Dan oil field
- Halfdan field
- Siri, Nini and Cecilie oil fields
- Valdemar oil and gas field
- Skjold oil field
- Harald gas field
- Ravn oil field
