= Bangladesh MHM School & College =

Bangladesh M.H.M. School & College

Location
- Abu Hamour, Doha, Qatar. Doha; Qatar
- Coordinates: 25°13′25″N 51°29′37″E

Information
- Type: Private expatriate school
- Motto: Knowledge is power
- Established: 1979
- Founder: Brigadier Mohammad Mashoor-ul-Haque
- President: H.E MD Jashim Uddin
- Director: Anwar Khurshed
- Staff: 180
- Gender: Males and females
- Age: 4 to 18+
- Enrollment: 3000
- Language: English, Arabic and Bangla
- Houses: 4
- Colors: House colors: Blue, maroon, green, yellow
- Publication: The Mirror

Bangladesh Mashoor-ul-Haque Memorial High School and College, commonly known as Bangladesh M. H. M. School, is a non-government institution operated by the Bangladesh Embassy in Qatar. It was established in 1979.

The institution follows the national curriculum of Bangladesh under the Board of Intermediate and Secondary Education (BISE) of Dhaka.

== History ==
It was established in 1979.

In 2005, the chairperson of the BISE of Dhaka, Prof. Shaheda Obaed, stated that the managing committee setup is not legal under BISE rules and should be abolished. The BISE also stated that no teachers may be fired without BISE approval; there was controversy after the principal of MHM fired two popular teachers.

The school was renovated in 2006.

== Transport ==
This school does not uses its own transport for the comfort of its students and facilities. school maintains a fleet of school buses. As of 2020 the school had over 35 buses, Three of which were recently acquired.

== Student body ==
As of 2020 the school had around 1700 to 2000 students. It serves the Bangladeshi expatriates in Qatar .
