= QatarEnergy =

Qatari state-owned oil company

- Type: State-owned enterprise
- Industry: Oil and gas
- Founded: 1974; 52 years ago
- Headquarters: Doha, Qatar
- Key people: Abdullah bin Hamad Al Thani (Chairman); Saad Sherida al-Kaabi (President & CEO)
- Products: Liquefied natural gas (LNG); Petrochemicals; Gas to liquids (GTL); Helium; Fertilizers; Steel; Aluminum
- Revenue: ▲US$52 billion (2022)
- Net income: ▲US$42.4 billion (2022)
- Total assets: ▲US$162 billion (2022)
- Owner: Government of Qatar
- Subsidiaries: QatarEnergy LNG; Industries Qatar; QAPCO; Gulf International Services; QChem
- Website: www.qatarenergy.qa

QatarEnergy (Arabic: قطر للطاقة) is the state-owned national petroleum and natural gas company of Qatar. The company operates all oil and gas related activities in Qatar, including exploration, production, refining, transport, and storage. The President and CEO is Saad Sherida al-Kaabi, who is also the minister of state for energy affairs.

The company's operations are directly linked with state planning agencies, regulatory authorities, and policy making bodies. Together, revenues from oil and natural gas amount to 60% of the country's GDP. As of 2018 it was the third largest oil and gas company in the world by oil and gas reserves. In 2022, the company had total revenues of US$52 billion, a net income of US$42.4bn, and total assets of US$162 billion. In 2021, QatarEnergy was the fifth largest gas company in the world.

== History ==
=== Establishment ===
Wells completed (Note: 1940,1941: 1942: 1947-1949: 1950: 1951: 1952: 1953: 1954: 1955: 1956: 1957: 1958: 1959: 1960:)
Year	Oil	Dry	Feet
1940	1		
1941	1		
1942	0	1	
1947 - 1949	9		
1948	3	0	16,200
1949	? (Note: These numbers don't add up. According to, there were 9 producers at the end of 1949; according to there were 9 in September 1949)		
1950	5	0	41,647
1951	5 (Note: 6 wells drilled in total including 1 observation well)	0	44,173
1952	9 (Note: Kharib No. 1 found nothing in the middle of the peninsula.)		
1953	6	2 (Note: Kharaib No. 2 found nothing in the middle of the peninsula.)	50,835
1954	4	0	30,017
1955	6	3	54,720
1956	1	4	39,868
1957	5	0	36,518
1958	3	0	18,070 (Note: Cumulative footage drilled to end of 1958 was 442,832ft)
1959	1		13,261
1960	2	2	30,344 (Note: 1 producer and 1 dry (wildcat Fuwairat No. 1); 13,344ft drilled onshore)

After World War I and the collapse of the Ottoman Empire, Qatar fell within the British sphere of influence and the first onshore oil concession in the country was awarded on 17 May 1935 to British Petroleum's predecessor, the Anglo-Iranian Oil Company (AIOC). Because of its obligations under the Red Line Agreement, AIOC on 3 October 1936 transferred the concession to an associate company of the Iraq Petroleum Co., Petroleum Development (Qatar) Ltd. (Note: incorporated August 1936; renamed Qatar Petroleum Co. Ltd (QPC) on 24 June 1953) which would operate the concession. In October 1938, Dukhan No. 1 was spudded and in January 1940 struck oil flowing at 5,000bpd at a depth of 5,685ft. Three wells were drilled, 1 dry (struck water in May 1942) and 2 producers (ca. 5,000bpd each; #2 completed March 1941). However, World War II delayed development, the wells were plugged out of fear of them falling into the hands of Axis forces. Drilling resumed at the end of 1947 (at year's end Dukhan No. 4 was at 5,000 ft; the 2 wells plugged during the war were reopened in 1948) and the first crude was exported in December 1949 with the completion of a 73-mile 14-inch pipeline (69.7 mile 100,000bpd pipeline, consisting of 17.9 miles 12 3/4-inch and 51.8 miles of 14 1/2-inch pipe; the pipe manufactured in France, the pipeline designed by H. S. Austin who had been in charge of the Kirkuk-Haifa oil pipeline). The line led from the field on the west coast across the peninsula to the loading dock on the east coast at Umm Said, where two twin 16-inch 4,200 ft sea loading lines reached into deep water. The French tanker President Meny departed with the first load of oil on 31 December 1949. At the time there were at Umm Said 5 93,000bbl tanks, 5 130,000bbl tanks and 5 tanks of 148,000bbl each (1,855,000bbl total).

The first offshore concessions were granted in 1949 to the International Marine Oil Company (IMOC), which was a subsidiary of Superior Oil and the London-registered Central Mining & Investment Co. Superior was previously active in offshore operations in the Gulf of Mexico and in Venezuela. It was the third relatively small independent American company to get involved in the Persian Gulf after the American Independent Oil Co and Pacific Western Oil Co, which were active in the neutral zone. In early 1950 a controversy was settled between IPC and Superior+Central Mining in which IPC's claim to the seabed to which they felt entitled under their original concession was in part granted with IPC gaining the rights to everything within a 3 mile belt around the peninsula while Superior's concession covered everything beyond 3 miles to a distance of 12 miles. IMOC did exploratory work in 1950 and 1951 with discouraging results and turned back the concession in 1951. In 1952, after IMOC had withdrawn, the Shell Co.-Qatar (SCQ) acquired exploration rights to most offshore territory with a concession dated 29 November 1952. In 1960 and 1963, the Idd Al-Shargi and Maydan Mahzam fields were discovered, respectively. Bul Hanine, the largest offshore field, was discovered in 1970 and began producing in 1972.

Shell employed the first offshore drilling platform (1,200 tons) in the Eastern Hemisphere in the waters to the east of Qatar. The first well, Matbach No. 1 was spudded at a depth of 32 ft of water in February 1955 and was abandoned at 6,706 ft in August 1955. The second test, Idd el Shargi No. 1 was abandoned in December 1956 at 11,883 ft. As the platform was being moved to Doha for modifications it got wrecked on 27 December – 30 December 1956, with several lives lost. A total of $21 million was invested in this endeavor at that point. The company built a new 209 ft-by-105 ft 5,930-ton platform, the Seashell, capable of drilling to 17.000 ft, in the Netherlands for $5 million. After commissioning in Doha Bay in December 1959, Shell struck oil with the new platform with Idd el Shargi No. 2 in April 1960 at about 8,000 ft, then drilled Hadet Shibeeb No. 1 (abandoned as a dry hole in September 1960) and then struck oil with Idd el Shargi No. 3, after which the Seashell was moved in March 1961 to the Idd el Shargi No. 4 location.

Qatar production by field, by year (x 1,000 barrels)
Year	Dukhan	Shargi	Mahzam	Hanine	Bundug
1949	750				
1950	12,342				
1951	18,030				
1952	25,342				
1953	31,046				
1954	36,479				
1955	41,958				
1956	45,318				
1957	50,835				
1958	63,362				
1959	61,401				
1960	63,088				
1961	64,386				
1962	67,897				
1963	70,100				
1964	68,912	8,859			
1965	72,312	11,813	1,094		
1966	69,781	12,284	23,755		
1967	70,990	14,405	32,979		
1968	70,586	14,578	39,054		
1969	73,309	13,963	42,374		
1970	69,519	16,376	46,485		
1971	81,052	14,677	61,058		
1972	88,818	15,402	55,302	17,034	
1973	91,507	13,868	50,135	52,713	
1974	81,489	8,480	47,395	51,742	
1975	65,445	5,013	39,150	50,174	118
1976	85,567	5,060	33,078	50,226	7,469
1977	70,100	3,000	33,078	49,172	6,970
1978	84,047	3,505	29,108	53,037	4,256
1979	84,169	3,650	36,031	60,225	1,286
1980	81,900	6,994	29,998	58,862	68

=== Worker strikes ===
Early strikes focused on wages and conditions, and the emir encouraged strikes when negotiating new contracts to pressure concessions from the oil company.

In August 1952, a coalition of workers presented their demands to Ahmad Al Thani, the son of emir Ali Al Thani. Their demands centered on improved working conditions, less foreigners in high-ranking positions, and increased wages. Ahmad rejected these demands, causing the workers to present their grievances to the British. But while considering the ongoing conditions in country's labour sector, the International Labour Organization (ILO) issued new reports in November 2022, detailing the results of the Technical Cooperation Programme between the Government of Qatar and the ILO since it was launched in April 2018. The annual and four-year progress reports cover the substantial efforts that have been made in the areas of labour migration governance, the enforcement of the labour law and access to justice, and strengthening the voice of workers and social dialogue. These changes have improved the working and living conditions for hundreds of thousands of workers, though additional efforts are needed to ensure that all workers can benefit.

Former logo of the company before its rebranding

=== Nationalization of oil sector ===
In 1973, the state seized a 25 percent stake in onshore concessions of QPC and offshore concessions of SCQ. As part of the agreement, the government stake would increase by 5 percent every year until it reached 51 percent in 1981. However, in early 1974, the initial agreement was repealed after QPC agreed to a new agreement which would allow the state to increase its share in both companies to 60 percent.

In December 1974, the government officially announced its intent to acquire SCQ's and QPC's remaining shares. A government decree passed in 1975 declared government ownership of the remaining shares. Negotiations throughout the following years resulted in the government assuming full ownership of QPC's onshore concessions in September 1976 and the SCQ's offshore activities in February 1977, thus fully nationalizing the oil sector.

In 1991, Qatar Petroleum initiated an upgrade program for oil production facilities. The program included bringing the Diyab structure (Dukhan) online and enhanced oil recovery, particularly at the Dukhan field. QP expects to boost capacity at Dukhan from 335,000 bbl/d (53,300 m^{3}/d) in 2006 to 350,000 bbl/d (56,000 m^{3}/d) in 2008. QP is carrying out similar work at several smaller fields, including the offshore Bul Hanine and Maydam Mahzam. Prospects for new discoveries are limited. QP carried out much exploration activity during the early 1980s but exploration declined as the oil glut of the mid-1980s gathered pace. Since then, QP has encouraged foreign operators to apply for exploration licenses. Although the number of wells drilled grew significantly towards the end of the 1980s, there was little success. Most new exploration and production (E&P) is done offshore by international oil companies, including ExxonMobil, Chevron, and Total. While substantial E&P is underway, there have not been any major oil discoveries in Qatar during the last decade. Most anticipated new oil production will come from Maersk Oil (Denmark), which operates the Al Shaheen field. Maersk reached an agreement with Qatar Petroleum in December 2005, under which the company intends to drill more than 160 production and water injection wells and establish three offshore platforms. The total oil production from Al Shaheen is planned to be gradually increased from 240,000 bbl/d (38,000 m^{3}/d) at the beginning of 2006 to 300,000 bbl/d (48,000 m^{3}/d) by the end of 2009. When completed, Qatar would have more than 1,100,000 bbl/d (170,000 m^{3}/d) in crude production capacity.

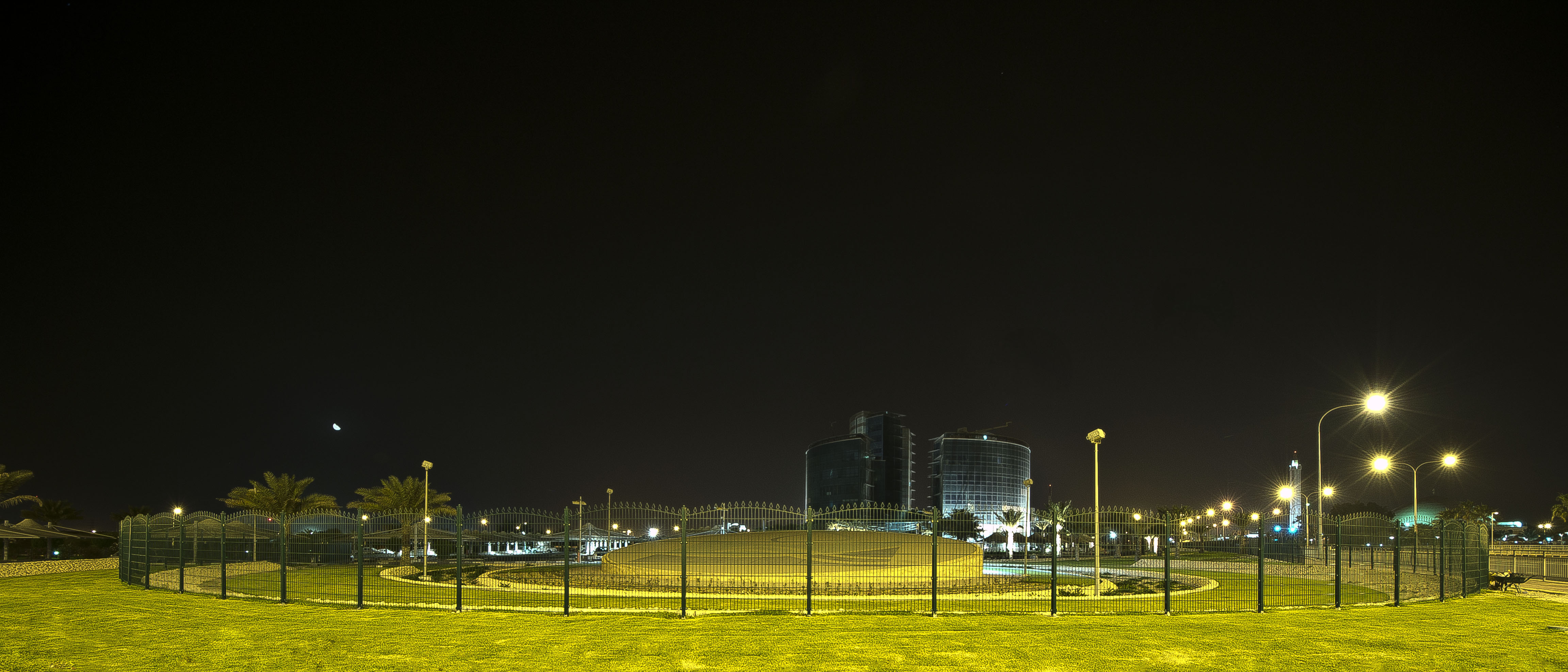
QatarEnergy's headquarters in Mesaieed, 2012

In August 2019, French multinational integrated oil and gas company Total confirmed signing deals over transferring some of its assets in Kenya, Guyana and Namibia to Qatar Petroleum. With the deals, QP will hold a 30% interest in Block 2913B and 28.33% in Block 2912 of Namibia. QP will also have 40% of the company holding Total's existing 25% interests in the Orinduik and Kanuku blocks of Guyana and 25% interest in Blocks L11A, L11B and L12 of Kenya.

On 4 March 2026, the company announced force majeure, due to the ongoing 2026 Iran war. The attacks on its Ras Laffan industrial city, caused it to halt production of LNG and associated products.

=== Pipeline operations ===
QatarEnergy operates Qatar's oil pipeline network, which transports supplies from oil fields to the country's lone refinery and export terminals. It operates an expansive offshore pipeline network that brings crude oil from offshore oil fields to Halul Island, where oil can be processed for export. Onshore, most oil is sent to Umm Said for refining or export. Qatar has three primary export terminals: Umm Said, Halul Island, and Ras Laffan. Qatar typically exports around 600,000 bbl/d (95,000 m^{3}/d) of crude and about 20,000 bbl/d (3,200 m^{3}/d) of refined petroleum products. Most exports go to Asia, with Japan as the single largest receiver (about 380,000 bbl/d (60,000 m^{3}/d) of crude in 2006).

=== Refining operations ===
Refining is carried out by two refineries - QatarEnergy Refinery in Umm Said and Laffan Refinery in Ras Laffan. Besides Qatar Petroleum has two joint ventures with South African Sasol (Oryx GTL) and British Shell plc (Pearl GTL) which are producing synthetic petroleum products (GTL-naphtha, GTL-diesel) from natural gas using Gas-to-Liquids technology.

Qatar's first refinery was built in Umm Said in 1953. The first revamp of the Refinery was completed in 1974. By the early 1980s, growth in local consumption was such that Qatar began importing refined products. In 1983, a 50,000 bbl/d (7,900 m^{3}/d) refinery came online at Umm Said. Currently, Umm Said Refinery has a refining capacity of 137,000 bbl/d (21,800 m^{3}/d).

Laffan Refinery (RL1) came on-stream in September 2009. The Refinery has a processing capacity of 146,000 barrels (23,200 m^{3}) per stream day and utilizes the field condensate produced at South Pars / North Dome Gas-Condensate field. After the revamp of the refinery is completed (RL2) it will have the processing capacity of 292,000 bbl/d (46,400 m^{3}/d).

== North Field LNG project ==
On 8 February 2021, the world's largest LNG supplier, Qatar Petroleum (now QatarEnergy), signed an EPC-contract with Chiyoda and Technip for the North Field East (NFE) expansion project to increase QE's annually LNG output by 40% until 2026.

For the $28.7 billion NFE expansion project, QatarEnergy has partnered with five global energy companies that have acquired 25% stake in the project. These include Shell, TotalEnergies and ExxonMobil, each with 6.25%, and Eni and ConocoPhillips, each with 3.125% stakes. In a first phase, LNG export capacity is expected to increase from 77 million tons per year to 110 million tons per year by 2026.

On 20 June 2022, Minister of State for Energy Saad Sherida al-Kaabi said at a press conference at the QatarEnergy that the expected production increase from this project will be 32.6 million tonnes annually. Ethane produced from the project would be 1.5 million tonnes per year, LPG 4 million tonnes per year, 250.000 barrels of condensate and 5.000 tonnes of helium per day.

In a second phase, the North Field South (NFS) project, Shell and TotalEnergies have each acquired 9.375% and ConocoPhillips 6.25% stakes. QatarEnergy plans to increase LNG production with the NFS project to 126 million tons per year beginning in 2028.

In April 2023, Sinopec acquired a 5% stake in an 8 million tonnes per year LNG train. In October 2023, QatarEnergy announced that it would provide 1 million tons a year of LNG from Qatar's North Field expansion project for 27 years to Eni. The long-term sale and purchase agreement will begin in 2026, where supplies will be delivered to the floating storage and regasification port unit in Piombino, Tuscany.

In the coming years, the Qatar government aims to significantly boost LNG production capacity, increasing it by 64 percent, reaching 126 million tons per year from the current 77 million. This will be further enhanced when production increases through the North Field Expansion (NFE) between 2025 and 2027. QatarEnergy is interested in increasing LNG production capacity by 49 mtpa (from 77 mtpa to 126 mtpa). QatarEnergy has inked LNG sale and purchase agreements with its joint venture partners for up to 18 mtpa, 38% of the capacity increase.

In September 2023, QatarEnergy ordered 17 LNG carriers to be built at HD Hyundai Heavy Industries for $3.9 billion. In February 2024, they selected Nakilat to own and operate 25 LNG carriers in the second batch of their LNG fleet expansion. In April 2024, the contract to build 18 LNG carriers was given to China State Shipbuilding Corporation.

== Dolphin Project ==
Qatar Petroleum is part of the Dolphin Gas Project, which connects the natural gas networks of Oman, the United Arab Emirates, and Qatar with the first cross-border natural gas pipeline in the Persian Gulf region. The project is being developed by Dolphin Energy, a consortium owned by Mubadala Development on behalf of the Abu Dhabi government (51 percent), Total (24.5 percent), and Occidental Petroleum (24.5 percent). The Dolphin Project made significant progress in 2006. Construction was completed on all the project's upstream and downstream components by year-end except the gas processing plant located at Ras Laffan. A company spokesperson announced in March 2007 that it tested receiving and distribution facilities in the UAE, and expected to begin operations in June 2007. The 260-mile (420 km) long Dolphin Energy Pipeline currently sends 400 million cubic feet (11 million cubic metres) per day of natural gas supplies from the North field to markets in the UAE and Oman.

== Gas-to-liquids ==
GTL projects received significant attention in Qatar the last several years, and Qatar's government originally set a target of developing 400,000 bbl/d (64,000 m^{3}/d) of capacity by 2012. However, cancellations and delays substantially lowered this. In February 2007, ExxonMobil canceled its Palm GTL project, which was slated to produce 154,000 bbl/d (24,500 m^{3}/d). The company will instead develop the Barzan Gas Project, scheduled to supply 1.5 billion cubic feet (42 million cubic metres) per day by 2012. The Oryx GTL plant is a joint venture of QP and Sasol-Chevron GTL, and has a 34,000 bbl/d (5,400 m^{3}/d) capacity. The plant was commissioned in June 2006, but technical problems prevented the consortium from loading the first export until April 2007. In February 2007, Royal Dutch Shell held a groundbreaking ceremony for its Pearl GTL Project. The Pearl plant will be 51 percent-owned by QP, though Shell will operate the project with a 49 percent stake. The facility is expected to use natural gas feedstock to produce 140,000 bbl/d (22,000 m^{3}/d) of GTL products. The project will be developed in phases, with 70,000 bbl/d (11,000 m^{3}/d) capacity expected by 2010 and a second phase expected in 2011. The Pearl project will be the first integrated GTL operation in the world, meaning it will have upstream production integrated with the onshore conversion plant.

== International business ==
=== Europe ===
==== Germany ====
QatarEnergy signed an agreement with a group of German companies to provide energy. As per HE the Minister of State for Energy Affairs, Saad bin Sherida al-Kaabi, will sign liquefied natural gas (LNG) supply deals with European customers this year summer, that accompany expansion of the project. Annalena Baerbock praised the bilateral relations and also called for expanding global cooperation in the renewable energy sector. Baerbock also thanked Qatar for its repatriation operation in Afghanistan and the progress made by the State of Qatar in the field of human rights, adding that was a role model in this field, particularly due to its cooperation with the International Labor Organization.

==== Hungary ====
Hungary and Qatar have signed a gas exportation deal as Europe diversifies its energy sources. Hungary will begin receiving shipments of LNG from Qatar starting in 2027, following an agreement between the two countries. The agreement is a political one, with talks between QatarEnergy LNG and Hungary's MVM Group to determine the quantity, pace, and shipment route of the supplied gas. Hungary's demand for LNG has surged due to sanctions imposed by the European Union on Russia after the war on Ukraine. Qatar reclaimed its position as the largest LNG exporter in 2022 with 80 million tons of LNG. The Gulf country plans to supply 40% of all new LNG entering the global market by 2029.

==== Italy ====
In October 2023, QatarEnergy signed LNG supply deal with Italy's Eni for 27 years. Affiliates of QatarEnergy and Eni signed a long-term sale and purchase agreement for up to 1 million tons per year (mtpa) of liquefied natural gas (LNG) from Qatar's North Field expansion project.

==== France ====
On 11 October 2023, France's TotalEnergies has agreed to buy liquefied natural gas from Qatar for 27 years, cementing the European nation's commitment to fossil fuels beyond 2050. According to two long-term agreements, QatarEnergy, the country's largest energy provider, will send up to 3.5 million tons of LNG to France each year.

=== Asia ===
==== Bangladesh ====
In June 2023, QatarEnergy and Petrobangla signed a 15-year contract for the supply of 1.8 million tonnes of LNG per year starting in 2026. Qatar is trying to secure buyers for supply from expansion projects by providing shorter and less expensive liquefied natural gas contracts. The world's largest LNG expansion project is being built by QatarEnergy, which also signed the agreement with Bangladesh. It seeks to increase output by more than 60% by the year 2027.

==== China ====
China National Petroleum Corporation (CNPC), the largest gas importer in the country, is in the late stages of finalizing a huge long-term LNG import deal with Qatar. The QatarEnergy-Sinopec agreement was also the first long-term LNG off-take agreement from the NFE Expansion project. Qatar's North Field East and North Field South (NFS) projects are expected to come online in 2026 and 2027, respectively. QatarEnergy signed an agreement with a group of German companies to provide energy.

In June 2023, QatarEnergy signed a 27-year deal with China National Petroleum Corporation for 4 million metric tons of LNG to be delivered yearly. This is the second agreement that Qatar has made with a Chinese company in less than a year. In November 2022, Sinopec and QatarEnergy made a similar deal. Both CNPC and Sinopec also have an equity stake in the Qatar North Field eastern expansion which amounts to about 5% of an LNG train of 8 million metric tons of year.

==== India ====
A long-term deal was made in August 2023 between QE and GAIL (India) Ltd. for more than 1 million metric tons of LNG per year for 20 years. On 6 February 2024, QatarEnergy signed a supply deal with Petronet LNG for 7.5 million metric tons a year of LNG from 2028 to 2048. The agreement was to renew an existing deal with Petronet that expires in 2028 for the same amount of yearly LNG deliveries.

==== Japan ====
In July 2023, Prime Minister Fumio Kishida of Japan and Sheikh Tamim bin Hamad Al Thani of Qatar, agreed to increase LNG supplies in the future and therefore change the relationship between the two countries to be strategic and specifically emphasizing on energy, economy, security and defence. Previously existing LNG contracts expired between the two countries back in 2021 and 2022. In November 2022, QatarEnergy signed a charter contract with Japan's Mitsui O.S.K. Lines (MOL) for three LNG carriers to be built by Hudong–Zhonghua Shipbuilding and delivered by 2027. In February 2024, QE signed a deal with Mitsui & Co. for the supply of 11 million barrels of condensate to be delivered yearly for the next 10 years starting April 2024.

==== Kuwait ====
In January 2020, Qatar Petroleum signed a 15-year agreement with Kuwait to supply 3 million tonnes of liquefied natural gas (LNG) per year.

==== Lebanon ====
In January 2023, QatarEnergy joined TotalEnergies and Italy's Eni in a three-way consortium to explore oil and gas in two maritime blocks off the coast of Lebanon. In January 2026 a deal was signed with the Lebanese energy ministry to carry out seismic surveys in Block 8. It is reported that while TotalEnergy and ENI will take a stake of 35%, QatarEnergy will only take a stake of 30%.

==== Qatar ====
In August 2023, QE and Woqod made a sales and purchase agreement for petroleum products and LPG which will extend their current agreement for a further 5 years, until 2028.

==== United Arab Emirates ====
In July 2023, QatarEnergy and the Emirates National Oil Company (ENOC) signed a contract to supply 120 million barrels of condensate over 10 years.

==== Taiwan ====
In June 2024, QatarEnergy made a 27 year LNG sales and purchase agreement with CPC of Taiwan for 4 metric tonnes per annum (mtpa) of LNG.

=== North America ===
==== Canada ====
In March 2023, QatarEnergy signed an agreement to acquire stakes in two Canadian exploration blocks offshore Newfoundland and Labrador from ExxonMobil. After initially acquiring a 40% stake in Licence EL 1165A from Exxon in 2021, QE acquired stakes of 28% in Licence EL 1167 and 40% in Licence EL 1162.

==== United States ====
QatarEnergy signed a 15-year contract with Koch Fertilizer LLC, a fertilizer producer based in the United States, to deliver approximately 0.74 million tons of urea per year starting in July 2024. This agreement enables QatarEnergy, a major player in the global energy market, to supply urea, which is primarily used for agricultural purposes, to markets in the United States and other countries.

=== Africa ===
==== Namibia ====
QatarEnergy and the Ministry of Mines and Energy of Namibia signed a Memorandum of Understanding (MoU) in early April 2023 to improve energy cooperation. A signing ceremony was held at QatarEnergy's headquarters in Doha where CEO of QatarEnergy, Saad Sherida Al Kaabi and Tom Alweendo, Minister of Mines and Energy of Namibia, signed the MoU. QE already holds interests in three exploration licences offshore Namibia.

==== Egypt ====
In May 2024, QatarEnergy signed an agreement for stakes in two exploration sites in the Cairo and Masry concessions off the coast of Egypt. The agreement is a long-term partnership with ExxonMobile, Egyptian Natural Gas Holding Company and the Egyptian Ministry of Petrolium and Mineral Resources.

=== South America ===
==== Republic of Suriname ====
In July 2024, QatarEnergy and Chevron signed an agreement for 20% working interest in block 5 off the coast of Suriname.

==== Brazil ====
In June 2023, QatarEnergy joined together with Petronas, Petrobras and TotalEnergies for a Production Sharing Contract (PSC) for the ultra-deep water exploration block at Agua Marinha located in the Campos Basin near the coast of Brazil. They will operate the PSC with a 20% interest, the same as Petronas while Petrobas and TotalEnergies will have 30% interest.

==== Uruguay ====
In May 2026, QatarEnergy acquired participating interests in Uruguay's offshore exploration blocks OFF-2, OFF-4, and OFF-7 from BG International Limited, a subsidiary of Shell plc. Under the agreements, QatarEnergy obtained stakes ranging from 18% to 30% across the three blocks, marking its first entry into Uruguay’s upstream sector and expanding its presence in South America.

== Subsidiaries ==
=== Qatar Petrochemical Co. ===
Qatar was the first Persian Gulf state to build its own petrochemical industry. The Qatar Petrochemical Co. (QAPCO) was established on 9 November 1974, by Emiri Decree No. 109, as a joint venture between QP (84 percent) and CdF (Chimie de France) and began production of ethylene, low-density polyethylene, and sulfur in 1981. In August 1990, QP's interest in QAPCO was reduced to 80 percent, with the remaining 20 percent split equally between Enimont (Italy), and Elf Aquitaine (France) through its Atochem subsidiary. The importance of reliable gas supplies was demonstrated in the early years of QAPCO, which were marred by shortages of ethane feedstock arising from fluctuations of associated gas production along with movements of oil prices. QAPCO's facilities consist of an ethylene plant producing 840,000 metric tons per annum (MTPA), three low-density polyethylene (LDPE) plants with 780,000 MTPA and a sulphur plant with 70,000 MTPA. Current shareholders are Industries Qatar (80 percent) and TotalEnergies (20 percent).

=== Qatar Fertiliser Co. ===
The Qatar Fertiliser Co. (QAFCO) was founded in 1969 as a joint venture between the Qatari government, Norsk Hydro Norway, Davy Power and Hambros Bank, to produce ammonia and urea. The company is now owned by Industries Qatar (75 percent) and Yara International (25 percent). QAFCO inaugurated its first plant in 1973 with a design daily capacity of 900 tons of ammonia and 1000 tons of urea. The QAFCO complex in Mesaieed City comprises four completely integrated trains; each train is made up of two units, one for production of ammonia and the other for urea, besides a urea formaldehyde unit. QAFCO total annual production capacity now is 2.0 MMT of ammonia and 2.8 MMT of urea, making QAFCO the world's largest single site producer of urea. A new plant expansion was scheduled to be completed in early 2011 (QAFCO 5), using Snamprogetti and Haldor Topsoe design. The increase in ammonia production will be 4600 metric ton/day.

=== Qatar Chemical Co. ===
The Qatar Chemical Co. is a Qatari company owned by Mesaieed Holding Company Company(MPHC) 49 percent, Chevron Phillips Chemical International Qatar Holdings LLC (Chevron Phillips Chemical Qatar) 49 percent, and Qatar Petroleum (QP) 2 percent. MPHC is majority owned by QP. The Q-Chem facility is a world-class integrated petrochemical plant capable of producing high-density polyethylene (HDPE) and medium-density polyethylene (MDPE), 1-hexene, and other products. Over US $1 billion was invested to engineer, construct, and commission the Q-Chem facility, which began operations in late 2002. The Q-Chem complex in Mesaieed Industrial City comprises an ethylene unit (capable of producing 500,000 metric tons per annum (mtpa)), a polyethylene facility (capable of 453,000 mtpa), and a 1-hexene unit (capable of 47,000 mtpa). Q-Chem assets also include a sulfur recovery and solidification unit, a bagging and storage warehouse, a nitrogen unit, a water treatment plant, seawater cooling system, dock facilities and various administrative buildings.

=== Qatar Vinyl Co. (QVC) ===
Qatar Vinyl Company was established in 1997 and is located in Mesaieed Industrial City approximately 40 km South of Doha. The location of the plant is advantageous in terms of land, infrastructure, general utilities, safety, security and telecommunication. The plant has access to port infrastructure with sufficient capacity to accommodate vessels up to 55,000 tonnes for the import of salt and export of caustic soda, EDC and VCM.

The facilities were constructed by Krupp Uhde GmBH and Technip Italy.

Project completion was achieved approximately 30 months after signing of the EPC Contract, with start up of the facilities taking place during the second quarter of 2001. The initial workforce numbered around 180 employees. Qatar Vinyl Co. (QVC) shareholders are Mesaieed Petrochemical Holding Company (55.2 percent), QAPCO (31.9 percent) and QatarEnergy (12.9 percent).

=== Other subsidiaries ===
- Qatar Liquefied Gas Co. Ltd. (QatarEnergy LNG; other shareholders are ExxonMobil, Total, Mitsui, Marubeni)
- Qatar Fuel Additives Co. Ltd. (QAFAC; other shareholders are OPIC Middle East Corp., International Octane Ltd. and LCY Investments Corp.)
- Qatar Petroleum International (QPI) (100 per cent Owned)
- Qatalum- 50-50 joint venture between Qatar Petroleum and Norsk Hydro
- Qatofin Company Limited (Joint venture between Qatar Petrochemical Co. (QAPCO), TotalEnergies and QatarEnergy).
- Fereej Real Estate Co. QSC - Property investment, Facilities management and PM Services
- North Oil Company - 70% JV with Total that operates Al Shaheen Oil Field

== 2026 Production shutdown due to military attack ==
On 2 March 2026, the third day of the Iran war, the Qatari Ministry of Defense announced that Ras Laffan Industrial City and Mesaieed Industrial Area were struck by two Iranian drones. QatarEnergy soon announced that it has ceased all production of natural gas and its associated products, reportedly on order by Energy Minister Saad Sherida al-Kaabi. It later announced that it was declaring Force Majeure on its contracts with buyers, and internal sources speaking to Reuters said that it would soon be shutting down gas liquefication, and that restarting it would take weeks. These announcements caused increases in world gas prices, which analysts said was a part of the Iranian government's plan to apply pressure on the world to stop the war. On 6 March, al-Kaabi warned that if the war continues other Gulf energy producers may be forced to halt exports and declare Force Majeure, and that "this will bring down economies of the world". This announcement caused a jump in global oil prices.

On 6 March, it was reported that according to satellite imagery analysis by both Bloomberg and the Energy Economics and Society Research Institute in Tokyo, Ras Laffan, the main gas facility in Qatar, appears to have not been damaged before the "unprecedented shutdown" which sent fuel prices higher.

== Notes ==
Source	Reference	Date
Energy Information Administration	Qatar: Country Analysis	2011
Energy Information Administration	Iran: Country Analysis	2010
USGS	Northern Qatar Arch Extension - Zagros Fold Belt Province	2004
International Energy Agency	World Energy Outlook	2009
International Energy Agency	Natural Gas Market Review 2009	2009
International Energy Agency	Overseas Investments by China's National Oil Companies	2011
Qatar Petroleum	Annual Report	2009
Niels Fabricius	The Qatar Shell Gas to Liquids Project	2004
Oil and Gas Directory Middle East	Qatar	2009
