= NOGAT Pipeline System =

NOGAT
- Map of NOGAT

Location
- Country: North Sea, Netherlands
- Direction: north-south
- Start: Dutch continental shelf
- To: Den Helder

General information
- Type: natural gas
- Partners: NOGAT B.V. (GDF Suez, Total S.A., Energie Beheer Nederland, Venture Production
- Operator: GDF Suez
- Commissioned: 1992

NOGAT (Northern Offshore Gas Transport) is a natural gas pipeline system which connects Dutch continental shelf with an onshore gas plant and terminal at Den Helder, the Netherlands. The system has been operational since 1992. The Danish continental shelf pipeline system is connected to the NOGAT through the Tyra West – F3 pipeline and the German continental shelf pipeline system is connected to the NOGAT through A6-F3 pipeline.

NOGAT is owned by NOGAT BV, in which the 45% interest is held by Energie Beheer Nederland B.V. (EBN), a Dutch state-owned company, 48.3% is owned by GDF Suez, 5% by Total S.A. and 1.8% by Venture Production. The pipeline was originally operated by Nederlandse Aardolie Maatschappij BV (NAM), but after acquiring the NAM's stake in the pipeline, GDF Suez took over the operator's function.
