= Noreco =

Norwegian petroleum company

BlueNord ASA
- Company type: Public limited Company (ASA)
- Industry: Oil and gas
- Founded: 2005
- Founder: local industry leaders
- Headquarters: Oslo, Norway
- Key people: Riulf Rustad (Chairperson of the Board), Cecilie O. Lindseth (Managing Director)
- Revenue: NOK 2,423.5 million (2008)
- Operating income: ▲NOK 823.5 million (2008)
- Net income: ▲NOK 120.2 million (2008)
- Number of employees: 8 (2025)
- Website: Homepage

BlueNord ASA, formerly known as Norwegian Energy Company ASA or Noreco is an independent international petroleum company based in Norway. The company was established in January 2005 by Norway's local industry leaders. In December 2005, was awarded 3 production licences. In 2007, the company acquired Altinex ASA and in 2008, Talisman Oil Denmark. The main objective of the company is to explore, develop and produce oil and gas in the North Sea. The company operates in Norway, Denmark and United Kingdom.

In May 2023, the company changed its name from Norwegian Energy Company ASA to BlueNord ASA.

== See also ==
- Oselvar oil field
