= Maersk Oil =

Danish oil and gas company

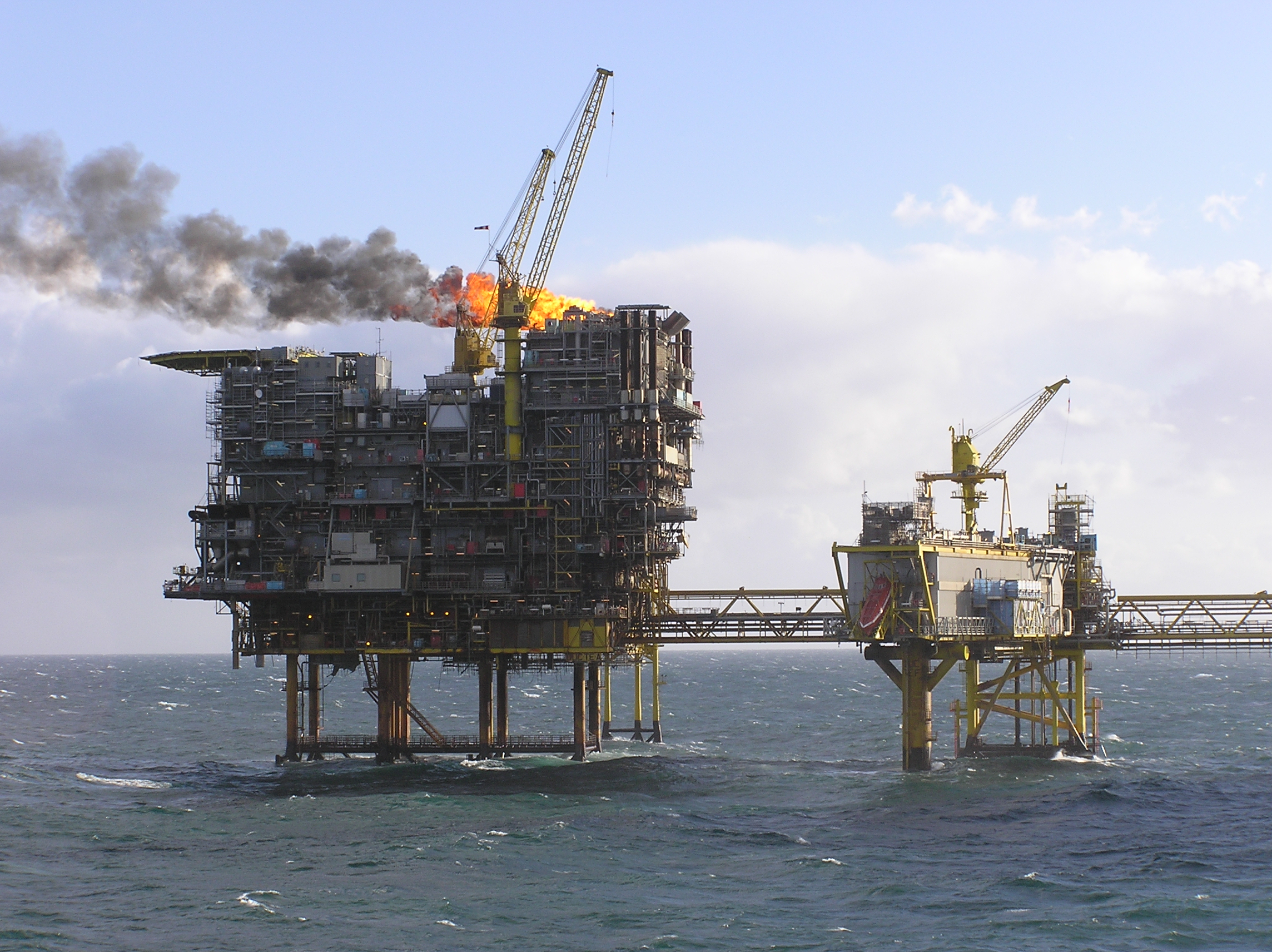
- North Sea oil and gas platform Tyra East, operated by Maersk Oil.
- Native name: Mærsk Olie og Gas A/S
- Formerly: Dansk Boreselskab
- Company type: Private
- Industry: Oil and Gas
- Founded: Copenhagen, Denmark 1962
- Founders: Arnold Peter Møller; Mærsk Mc-Kinney Møller
- Headquarters: Esplanaden 50, Copenhagen, Denmark
- Number of locations: Angola; Greenland; Denmark; Algeria; Kazakhstan; United Kingdom; United States; Norway; Brazil; Kenya; Ethiopia; Kurdistan Region of Iraq
- Area served: Worldwide
- Key people: Jakob Bo Thomasen (CEO); Graham Talbot (CFO); Gretchen Watkins (COO)
- Production output: 550,000 of BOE (2015)
- Services: Oil and Gas Exploration; Oil Production; Natural Gas Production
- Revenue: ▼US$5,639 million (2015); US$8,737 million (2014)
- Net income: ▼US$435 million (2015); US$1,035 million (2014)
- Total assets: ▼US$8.681 million (2015); US$10,792 million (2014)
- Number of employees: 2,800 (2017); 4.400 (2015); 4,400 (2014)
- Parent: TotalEnergies

Maersk Oil (Danish: Mærsk Olie og Gas A/S) was a Danish oil and gas company owned by the A. P. Moller-Maersk Group. with a maximum operated production of 550,000 barrels of oil equivalent per day. Production came from Denmark, the UK, Qatar, Kazakhstan, the US Gulf of Mexico, Algeria and Brazil. The company had exploration activities in Angola, Norway, Greenland, Kurdistan Region of Iraq and in the producing countries.

== History ==
The company was established in 1962 when Maersk Group was awarded a concession for oil and gas exploration and production in the Danish sector of the North Sea. In 1986, Maersk Oil took over the operation of the Dansk Undergrunds Consortium's fields in the Danish section of the North Sea.

On 31 August 2015, the UK Oil And Gas Authority approved a consortium headed by Maersk Oil going ahead with production at the Culzean oil and gas field about 150 miles southeast of Aberdeen, Scotland in the North Sea. The high pressure, high temperature field holds the equivalent of about 300 million barrels of oil and, when it reaches peak production in 2020 or 2021, is expected to produce enough gas to meet 5% of the UK's needs. Maersk Oil said that it and its other consortium partners, JX Nippon and BP (Britoil) would invest about £3 billion (about $4.5 billion) in the field's development.

On 21 August 2017 A.P. Møller – Mærsk A/S announced the signing of an agreement to sell Mærsk Olie og Gas A/S to TotalEnergies for US$7.45 billion in a combined share and debt transaction. The transaction was subject to regulatory and competition approval and was closed on 8 March 2018, when Maersk Oil became a part of Total.

On 20 September 2017, A.P. Moeller-Maersk A/S agreed to sell its tankers unit to the A.P. Moller Holding A/S subsidiary APMH Invest A/S, which was the controlling shareholder of A.P. Moller-Maersk. Maersk had owned the tanker business since 1928, which at the time of the sale, had a fleet of 161 vessels to transport refined oil products.

== See also ==
- List of oil and gas fields of the North Sea § Denmark
