= Kupferschiefer =

Copper-bearing shale deposit in Central Europe

- Stratigraphic range: Late Permian; 258.9–255.7 Ma
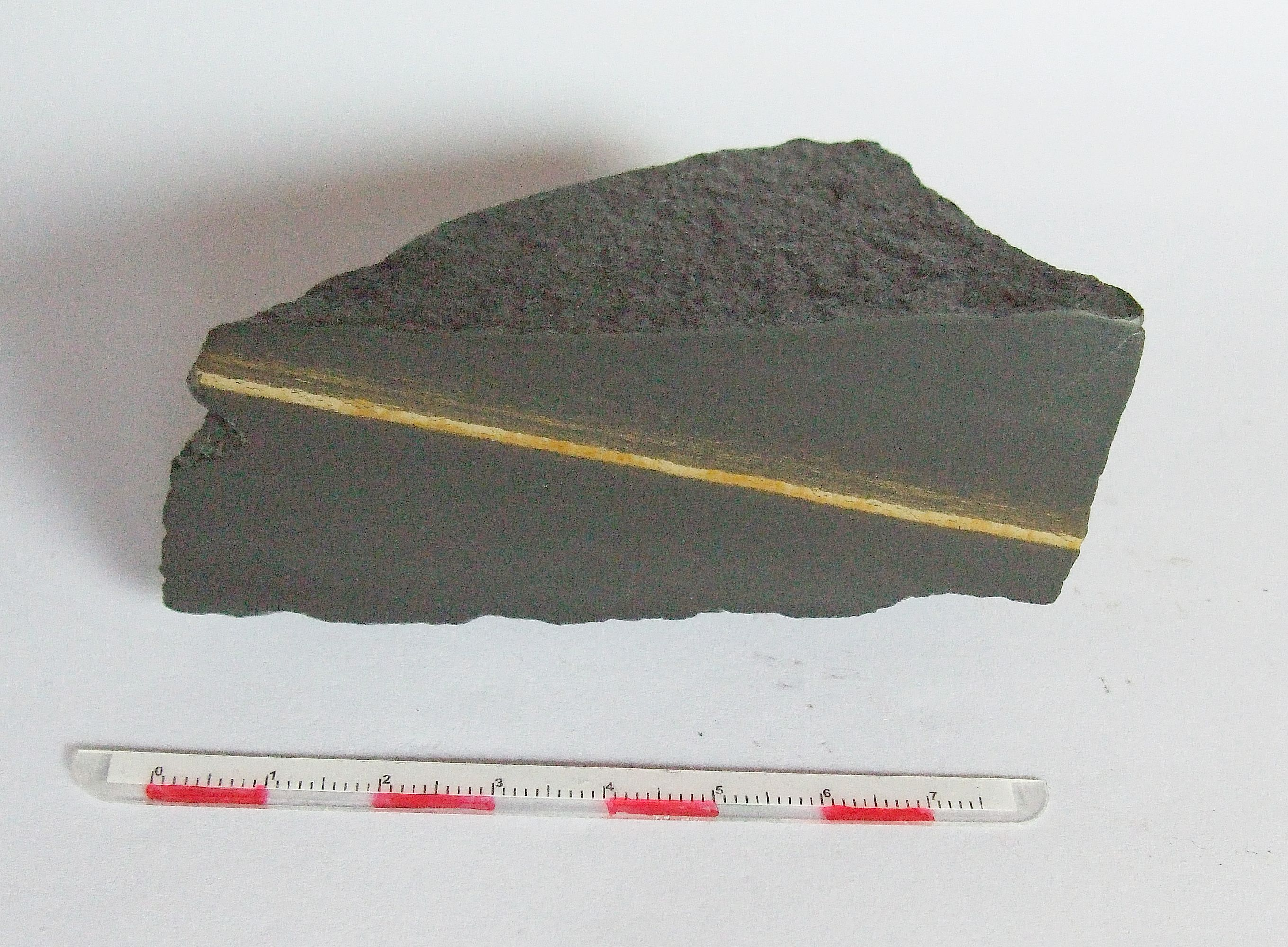
- Sample of shale with chalcopyrite vein from the Kupferschiefer
- Type: Member
- Unit of: Werra Formation
- Underlies: Zechstein Limestone
- Overlies: Rotliegend Group
- Area: 600,000 km^{2} (230,000 sq mi)
- Thickness: Typically 30 to 60 centimetres (12 to 24 in); Max. 2 m (6.6 ft)

Lithology
- Primary: Black shale, marl
- Other: Mudstone, limestone, copper, zinc, lead, silver, gold, platinum

Location
- Coordinates: 51.0°N 10.0°E
- Approximate paleocoordinates: 15.3°N 22.6°E
- Region: North-central Europe
- Country: Denmark; Germany; Lithuania; Netherlands; Poland; Russia (Kaliningrad)
- Extent: Southern Permian Basin

Type section
- Named for: "Kupfer" = copper, "Schiefer" = shale
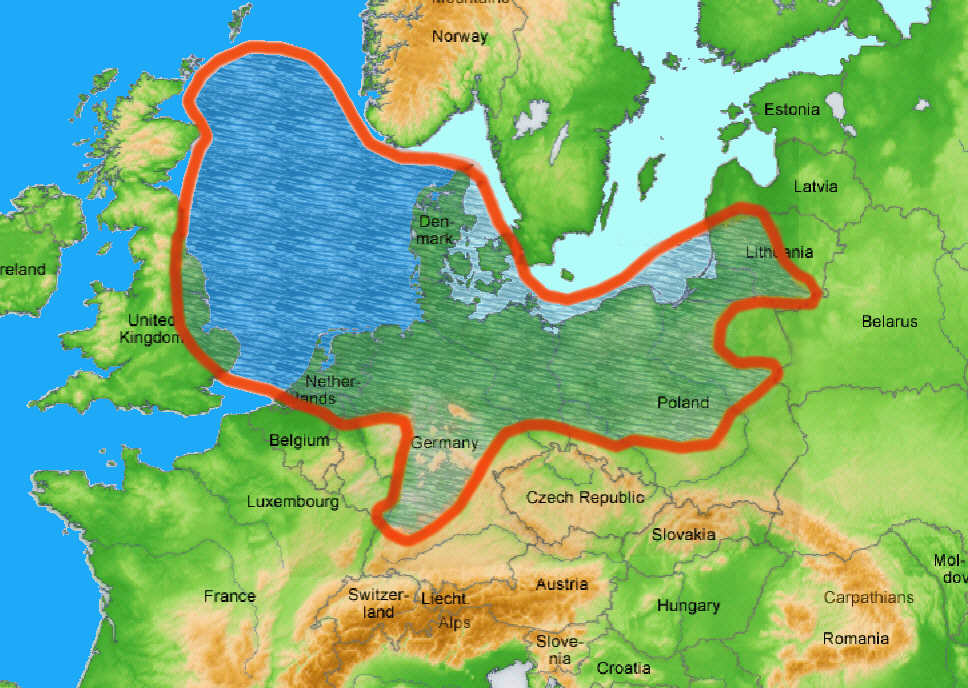
- Extent of the Zechstein sea, where the Kupferschiefer was deposited

The Kupferschiefer (German for Copper Shale, Copper Schist or Copper Slate) or Kupfermergel (Copper Marl), (T1 or Z1) is an extensive and remarkable sedimentary unit in Central Europe. The relatively monotonous succession is typically 30 to 60 centimetres (12 to 24 in) and maximum 2 metres (6.6 ft) thick, but extends over an area of 600,000 square kilometres (230,000 sq mi) across the Southern Permian Basin. The Kupferschiefer can be found in outcrop or in the subsurface straddling six countries, including parts of the southern North Sea. The lateral equivalent outcropping in England is called Marl Slate.

Despite its distinctive nature, the Kupferschiefer is not ranked as a formation but is officially declared a sub-unit of the Werra Formation, the lowest formation of the Zechstein Group, overlying the Rotliegend Group. The unit has been dated to 257.3 ± 1.6 Ma, placing it in the Wuchiapingian stage of the Late Permian.

The Kupferschiefer comprises black shales, bituminous marls, mudstones and limestones deposited mostly in an open marine setting, with the borders of its extension deposited in a shallow marine environment. At time of deposition, the area what is now northern Europe was covered by an enclosed sea; the Zechstein sea, characterized by anoxic conditions.

The Kupferschiefer is renowned for hosting one of the most important copper deposits in the world, which were mined at least since 1199 AD. Other mineral resources found in the unit include zinc, vanadium, lead and silver.

The Kupferschiefer is also an important lagerstätte; having provided fossils of early Archosauromorph reptiles, the ancestors to modern crocodiles and extinct dinosaurs, as well as pareiasaurs, many fossil fish, including Coelacanthus granulatus, Dorypterus hoffmanni and Palaeoniscum freieslebeni, flora and other fossils. Famous finds from the unit include Parasaurus geinitzi, Protorosaurus speneri, Weigeltisaurus jaekeli and Glaurung schneideri.

== Description ==
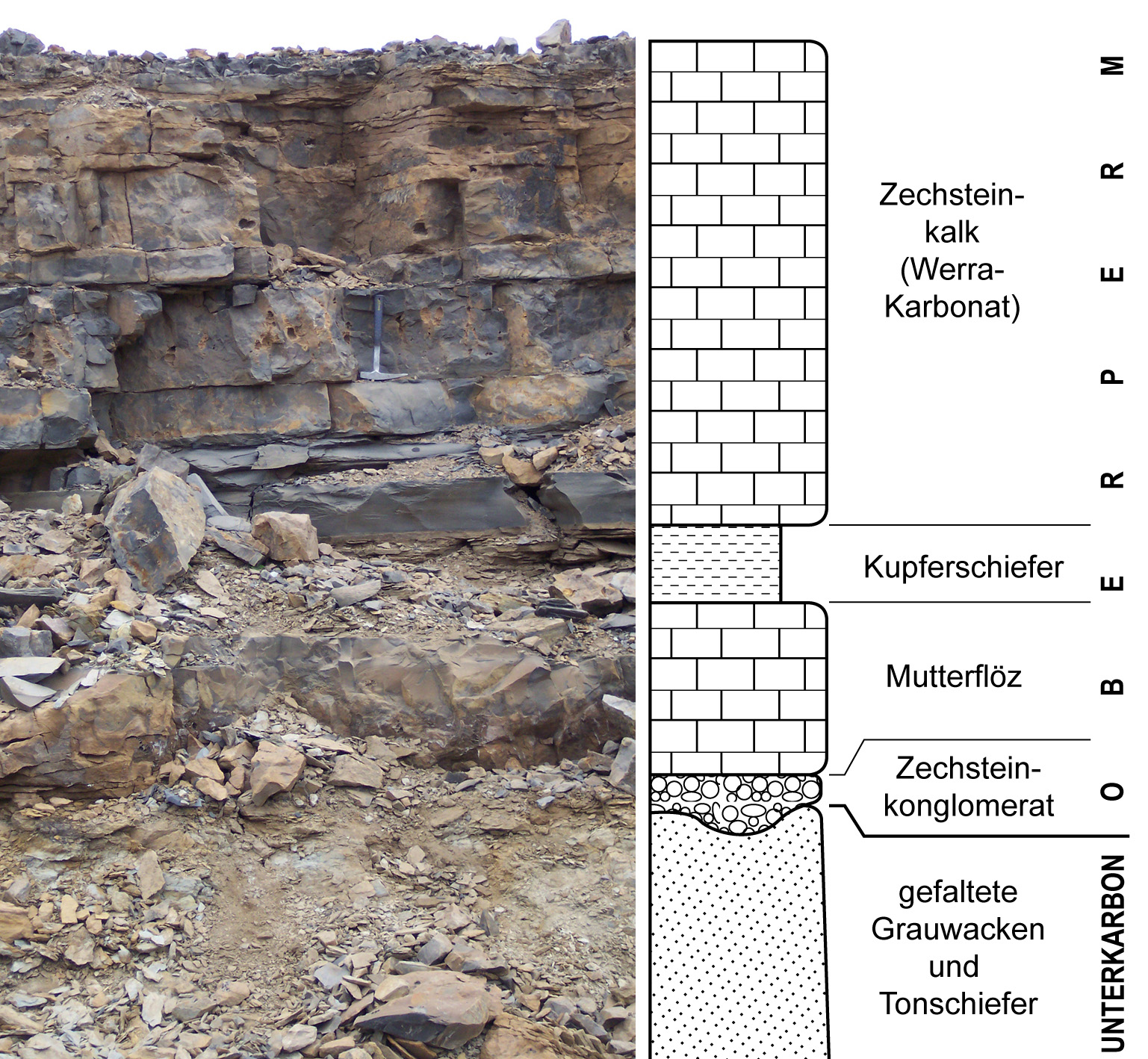
Stratigraphic succession including the Kupferschiefer in the Kamsdorf mine near Saalfeld, Thuringia

The Kupferschiefer is a regional stratigraphic unit stretching across an area of 600,000 square kilometres (230,000 sq mi) in the Southern Permian Basin of north-central Europe. The unit is typically 30 to 60 centimetres (12 to 24 in) thick. In the Rossenray 2 shaft, the unit reaches a maximum thickness of 2 metres (6.6 ft). The Kupferschiefer unconformably overlies various formations of the Rotliegend Group and the Varsican basement and forms the basal unit of the Zechstein Group. In some parts of the Zechstein Basin, the Kupferschiefer is underlain by the Mutterflöz Limestone, an organic-lean thin limestone unit. Despite its distinctive nature, the Kupferschiefer is not ranked as a formation but is officially declared a sub-unit of the Werra Formation, the lowest formation of the Zechstein Group. The Kupferschiefer is overlain by the Zechstein Limestone sub-unit of the Werra Formation.

The unit has been dated to 257.3 ± 1.6 Ma, placing it in the Wuchiapingian stage of the Late Permian. The age of the unit corresponds to the Ilinskoe part of the Sokolki Assemblage Zone of European Russia and the Tropidostoma Assemblage Zone of the Karoo Basin of South Africa.

The Kupferschiefer contains up to 30% organic matter, with variations across its extent. The basinal facies shows values of between 5 and 25% TOC, while the marginal facies present values up to 7% TOC and swell facies are much poorer in organic matter with values below 1%.

=== Basin history ===
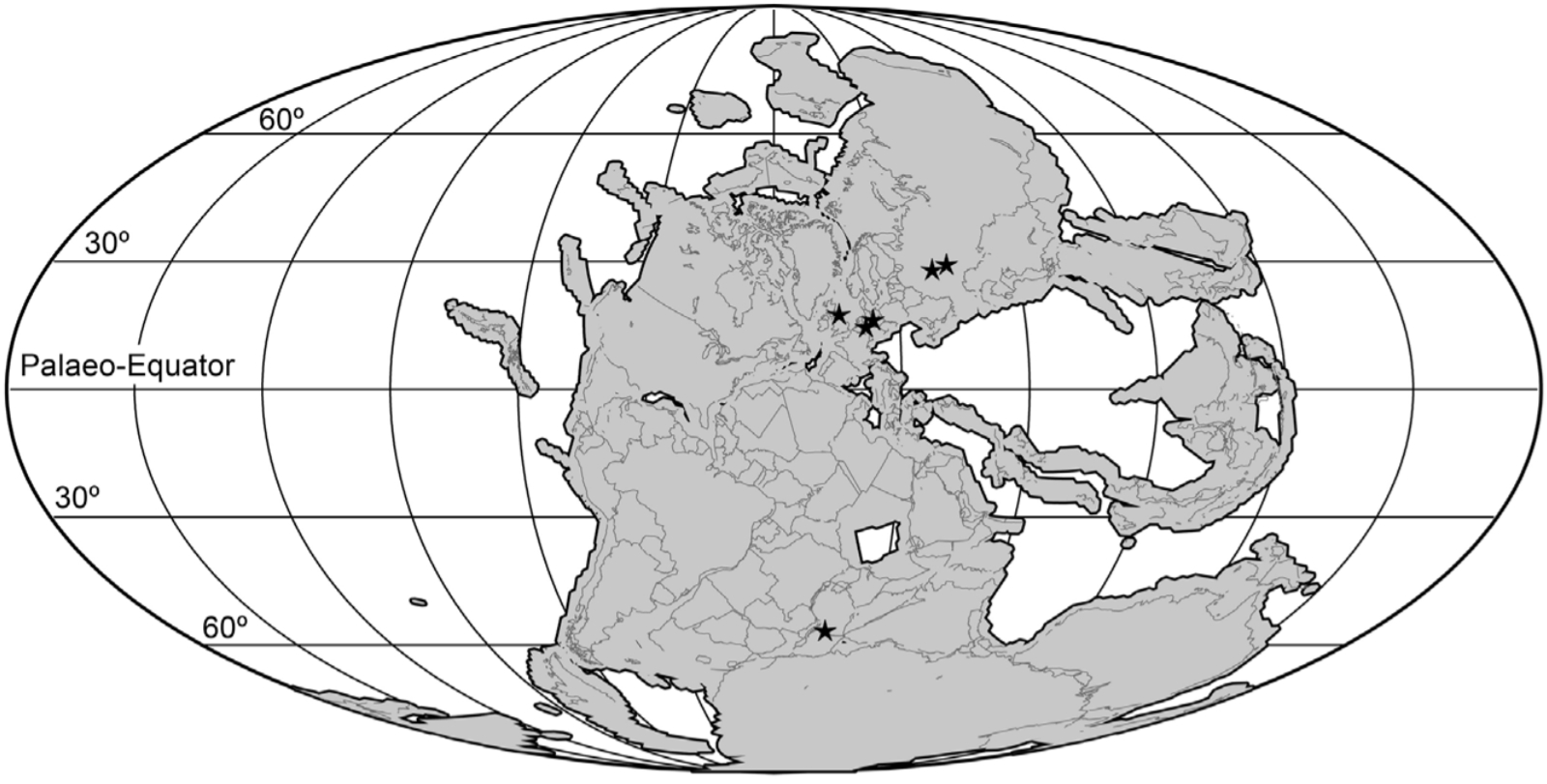
Paleogeography of the Late Permian (260 Ma), with Archosauromorpha fossil locations indicated. Note the Zechstein sea is not shown as an inland sea.

=== Depositional environment ===
The Kupferschiefer was deposited in a highstand setting, in a deep enclosed basin, covered by the Zechstein sea that was present on the paleocontinent Laurussia, the northern part of Pangea. The basin possibly had periodic connections to the Paleo-Tethys Ocean. Sedimentation rates during Kupferschiefer deposition were low, estimated at 5 millimetres (0.20 in) per thousand years.

The climate of the Late Permian was extremely variable, with polar icecaps present near the south pole and hot and arid conditions prevailing in the tropic and paleotemperate regions of the northern and southern hemispheres. The Zechstein sea in the Late Permian was located at paleolatitudes around 15 to 16 degrees north. Large areas of Pangea were covered by deserts and arid conditions also prevailed near the Zechstein sea of the time.

Apatite oxygen isotope analysis has revealed that the Late Permian was characterized by a drastic increase in global temperatures, accompanied by a strong rise of eustatic sea level. The rise in oxygen isotope values was possibly related to an increase in volcanic activity. The Permian-Triassic extinction event, the biggest extinction event in geologic history, is thought to have been caused mostly by large volcanic provinces of the Siberian Traps.

== Mining ==
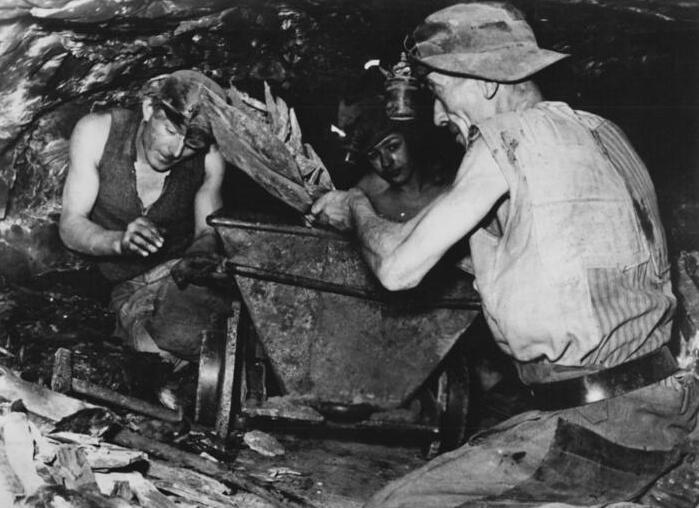
Miners extracting copper in Mansfeld

Prehistoric finds of slag and bronze from smelting sites on top of or immediately adjacent to outcropping Kupferschiefer ores at Wettelrode, Mohrungen, and Bottendorf in Central Germany evidence Early to Middle Bronze Age mining of the Kupferschiefer ores. The medieval mining history of the Kupferschiefer ores is documented in written sources since at least 1199 A.D. from the Mansfeld district in Central Germany. The Counts of Mansfeld developed several copper mines, smelters, and a mint at the town of Eisleben, where copper and silver coins were minted from the metals of the Kupferschiefer ores.

=== Germany ===
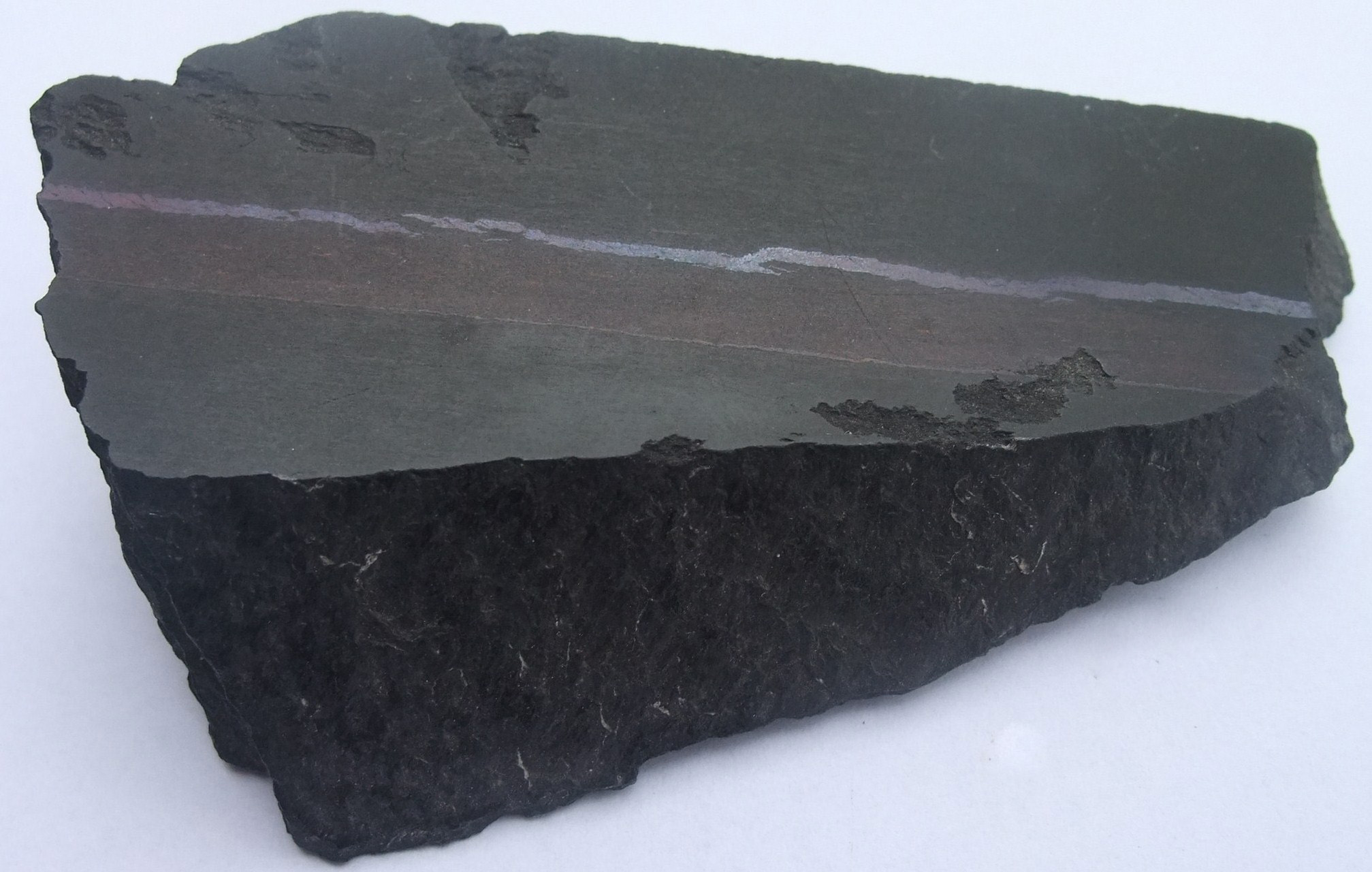
Kupferschiefer from Mansfeld with a vein of bornite

The main mining district of the Kupferschiefer in Germany was Mansfeld Land, which operated from at least 1199 AD, and has provided 2,009,800 tonnes of copper and 11,111 tonnes of silver. The Mansfeld mining district was exhausted in 1990.

Eisleben in the Mansfeld Land is the type locality of two minerals; the nickel-arsenate maucherite, and betekhtinite, a copper-lead-iron sulfide. The latter mineral has a co-type locality in the Ernst-Thälmann shaft, that operated from 1906 to 1962 and produced 260,000 tons of copper; about 10% of the overall production from the Mansfeld area.

Many minerals have been found in the Sangerhausen district of Saxony-Anhalt, which produced 619,200 tonnes of copper and 3,102 tonnes of silver as of 2012, with 860,000; respectively 4,650 tonnes as remaining proven reserves.

In the Spremberg-Graustein-Schleife mining area, stretching across the Brandenburg district Spree-Neiße and Görlitz in Saxony, the Kupferschiefer is estimated to contain 130 million tonnes of ore, of which 1,486,000 tonnes of copper, with a copper content of 1.47%. The mining district is about 15 by 3 kilometres (9.3 mi × 1.9 mi) and the copper-bearing beds lie at a depth between 980 and 1,580 metres (3,220 and 5,180 ft).

The Kupferschiefer contains up to 3% copper, 10 ppm of platina and up to 3000 ppm gold.

The "Im Lochborn" mine, mining from the Kupferschiefer, located in Bieber, Hessen is the type locality of the mineral bieberite, a cobalt sulfate named after the location. The mineral rösslerite, a magnesium arsenate, also has the mine as type locality.

=== Poland ===
Two main Kupferschiefer mining areas in Poland are the North-Sudetic trough, with 212,894 tonnes of copper and 756.7 tonnes of silver mined as of 2012 and an estimated remaining reserves of 1,460,000 tonnes of copper, and the Fore-Sudetic monocline, with more than 20,000,000 tonnes of copper and more than 14,085 tonnes of silver mined since 1949. Main mining districts in Poland are the Głogów industrial district, the Lubichów and Grodziec fields, and the Konrad, Lena, Lubin, Nowy Kosciół, Polkowice, Rudna and Sieroszowice mines. The latter mine is the type locality for the silver-quicksilver amalgame, eugenite. The Polkowice mine is the type locality for two rare lead and germanium-bearing sulfide minerals; polkovicite, named after the mine, and morozeviczite.

== Paleontological significance ==
The Kupferschiefer has provided unique fossils of an early reptile; Protorosaurus speneri belonging to the Archosauromorpha, as well as Pareiasauria, fish, an insect and fossil flora.

As of 2014, at least 28 Protorosaurus speneri specimens are known from the Kupferschiefer in the states of Thuringia and Hesse in central Germany. The type locality for the species is Glücksbrunn, Heidelberg, near Schweina in Thuringia. The type locality for Parasaurus geinitzi is Walkenried in Lower Saxony. Fossils of both species were found containing quartz pebbles in their guts.

Fossil fish of the species Palaeoniscum freieslebeni are abundantly found in different locations in the Kupferschiefer. The species epithet of the "Eisleben Shale Fish", or "Kupferschiefer Herring" refers to Johann Karl Freiesleben, the Berghauptmann (mining inspection director) of Saxony. Other fish found in the Kupferschiefer include Coelacanthus granulatus, Hopleacanthus richelsdorfensis, Acentrophorus glaphyurus, Menaspis armata, Muensterichthys buergeri, Platysomus striatus, and two species of Janassa and Wodnika.

=== Fossil content ===
Group	Fossils	Image	Notes
Archosauromorpha	Protorosaurus speneri		
Weigeltisauridae	Weigeltisaurus jaekeli		
Weigeltisauridae	Glaurung schneideri		
Pareiasauria	Parasaurus geinitzi		
Fish	Palaeoniscum freieslebeni		
Fish	Coelacanthus granulatus		
Fish	Hopleacanthus richelsdorfensis		
Fish	Janassa bituminosa, J. korni		
Fish	Menaspis armata		
Fish	Wodnika althausi, W. striatula		
Fish	Acentrophorus glaphyurus		
Fish	Dorypterus hoffmanni		
Fish	Eurysomus macrurus		
Fish	Globulodus elegans		
Fish	Muensterichthys buergeri		
Fish	Platysomus striatus		
Fish	Pygopterus humboldti		
Fish	Reticulolepis exsculpta		
Fish	Acrolepis sp.		
Fish	Ctenacanthus richelsdorfensis		
Insects	Protereisma rossenrayensis		
Nautiloids	Peripetoceras freieslebeni		
Nautiloids	Pteronautilus seebachianus		
Bivalves	Aviculopinna prisca		
Bivalves	Bakevellia sp.		
Macroflora	Neocalamites mansfeldicus		
Macroflora	Sphenobaiera digitata		
Macroflora	Baiera mansfeldensis		
Macroflora	Esterella gracilis		
Macroflora	Bhenania reichelti, Calipteris martinsi, Pseudovoltzia liebeana, Quadrocladus orobiformis, Q. solmsi, Sphenopteris kukukiana, Ullmannia bronni, U. frumentaria		
Pollen	Crustaesporites globosus, Illenites cf. bentzi, I. cf. unicus, Jugasporites delasaucei delasaucei, J. delasaucei moersensis, Lueckisporites richteri, L. virkkiae, Nuskoisporites dulhuntyi, Pityosporites granulatus, P. schaubergeri, P. zapfei, Platysaccus papilionis		

== Geologic maps ==
Zechstein in blue

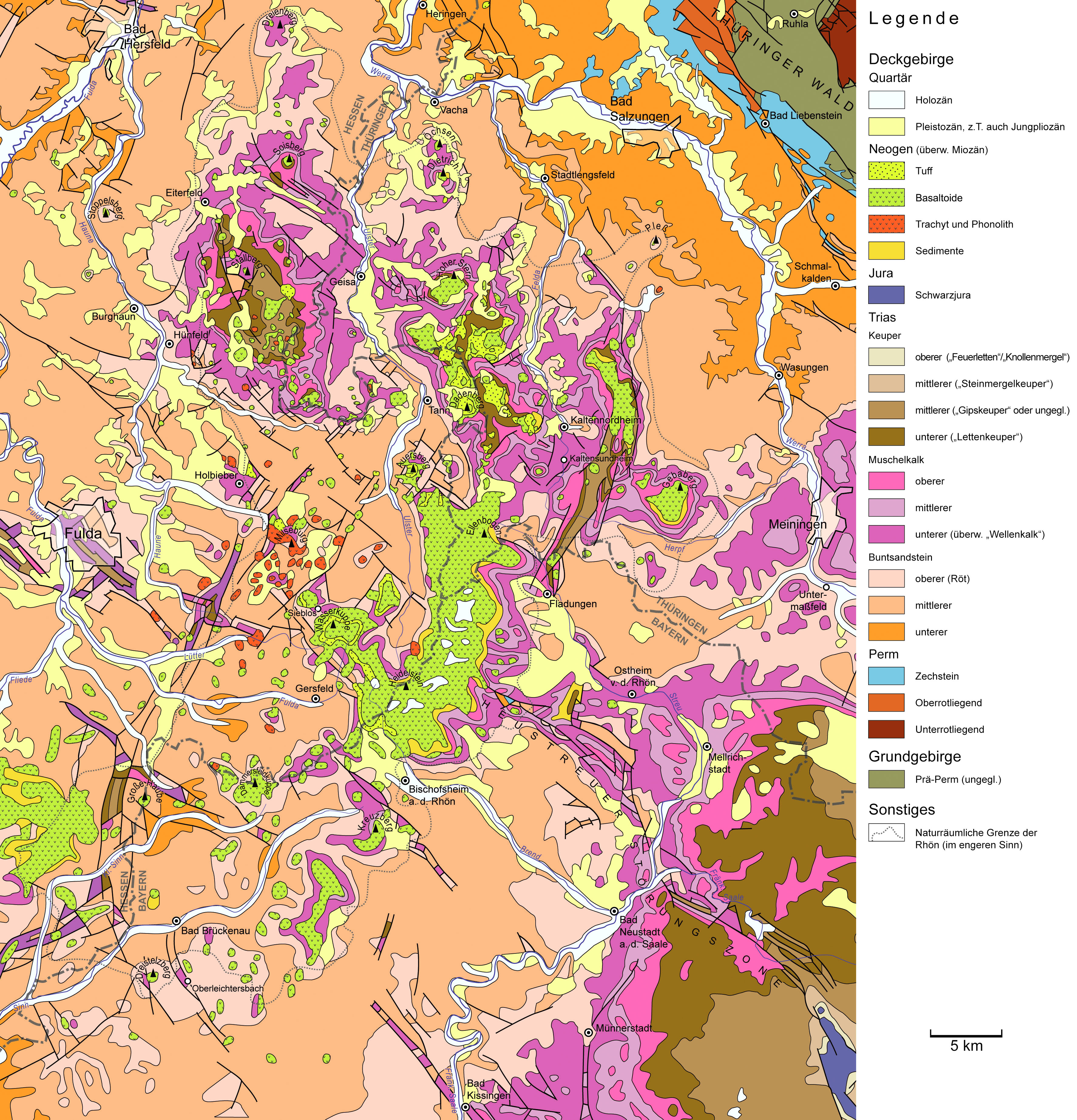
Rhoen

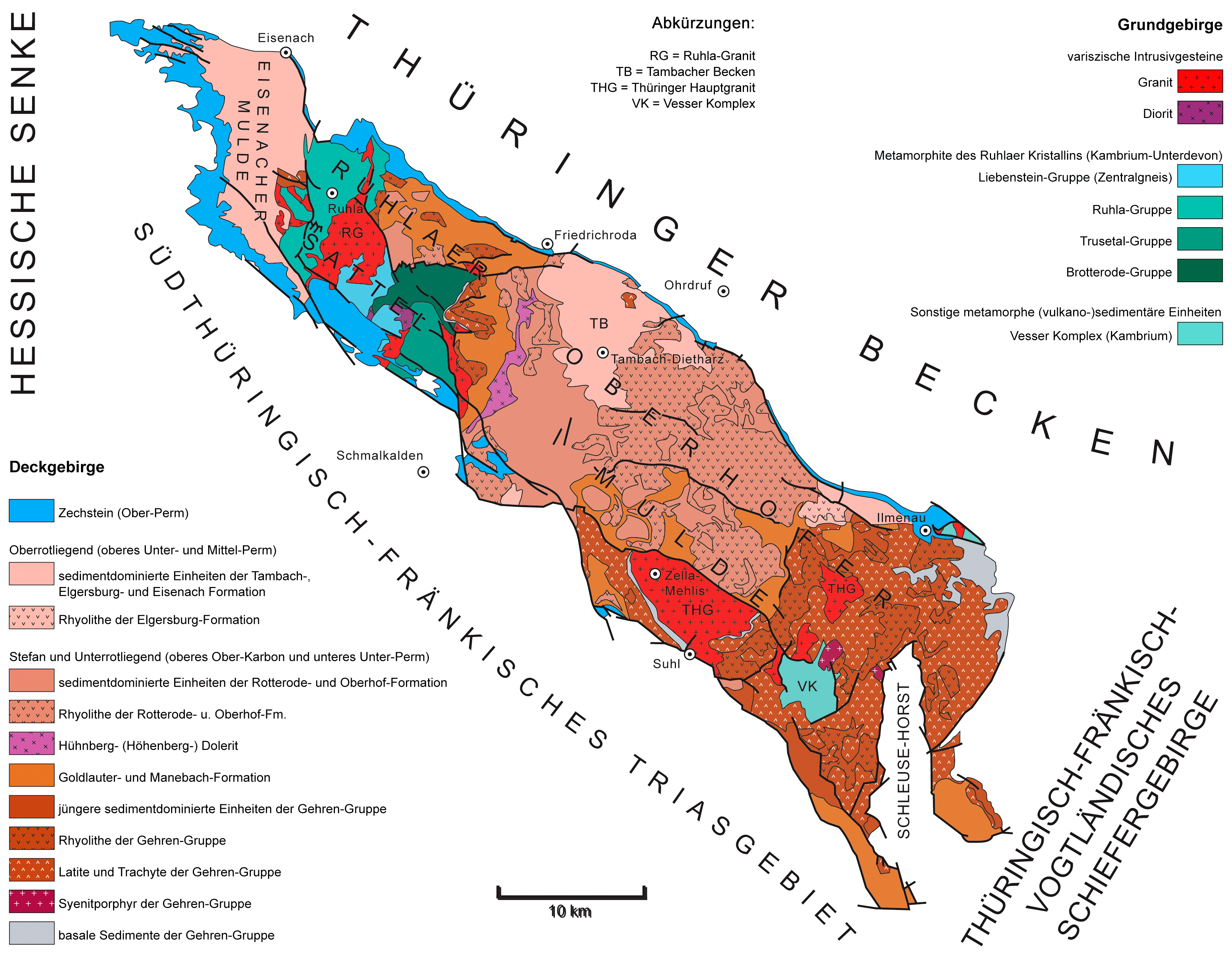
Thuringian Forest

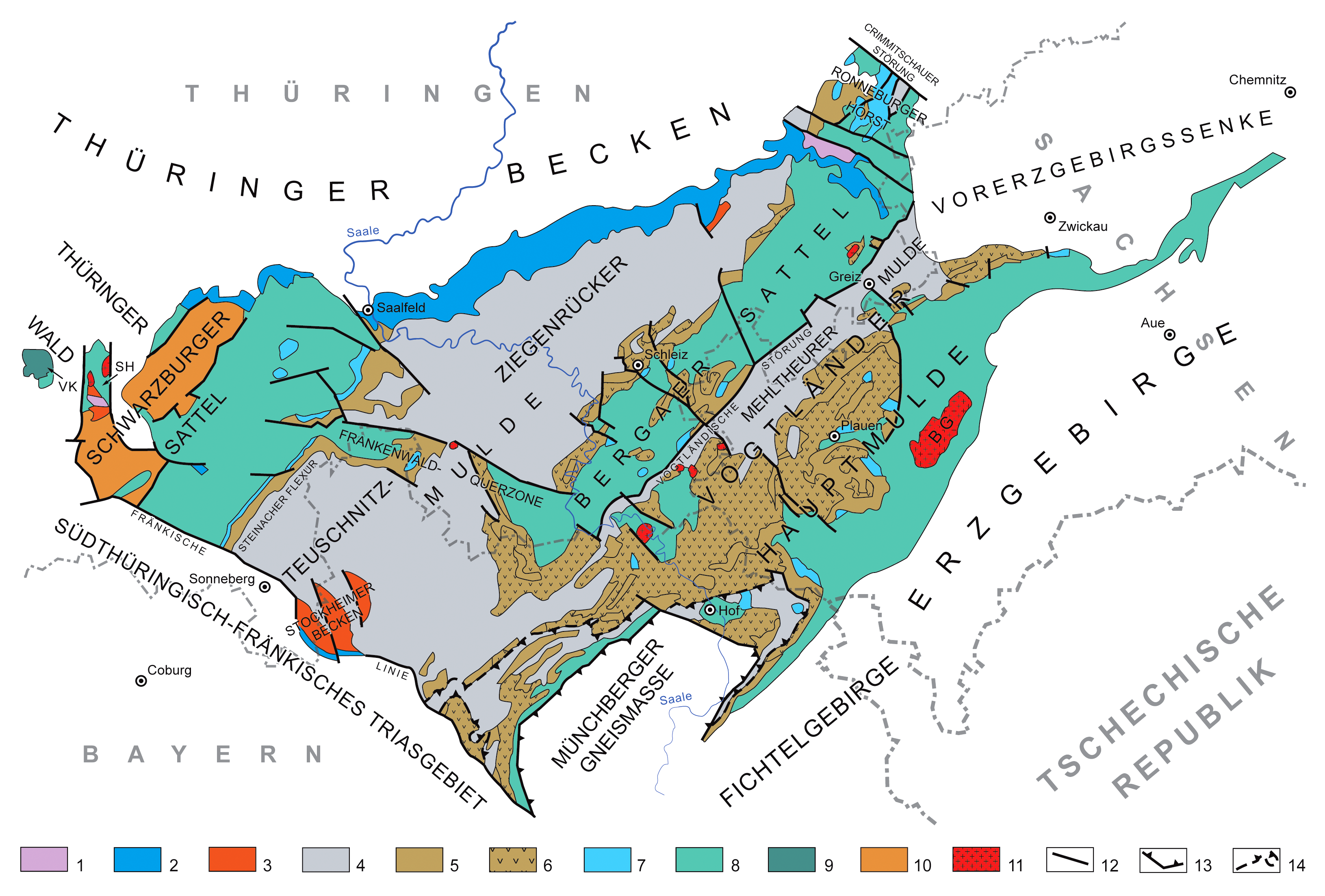
Thuringian-Franconian mountains

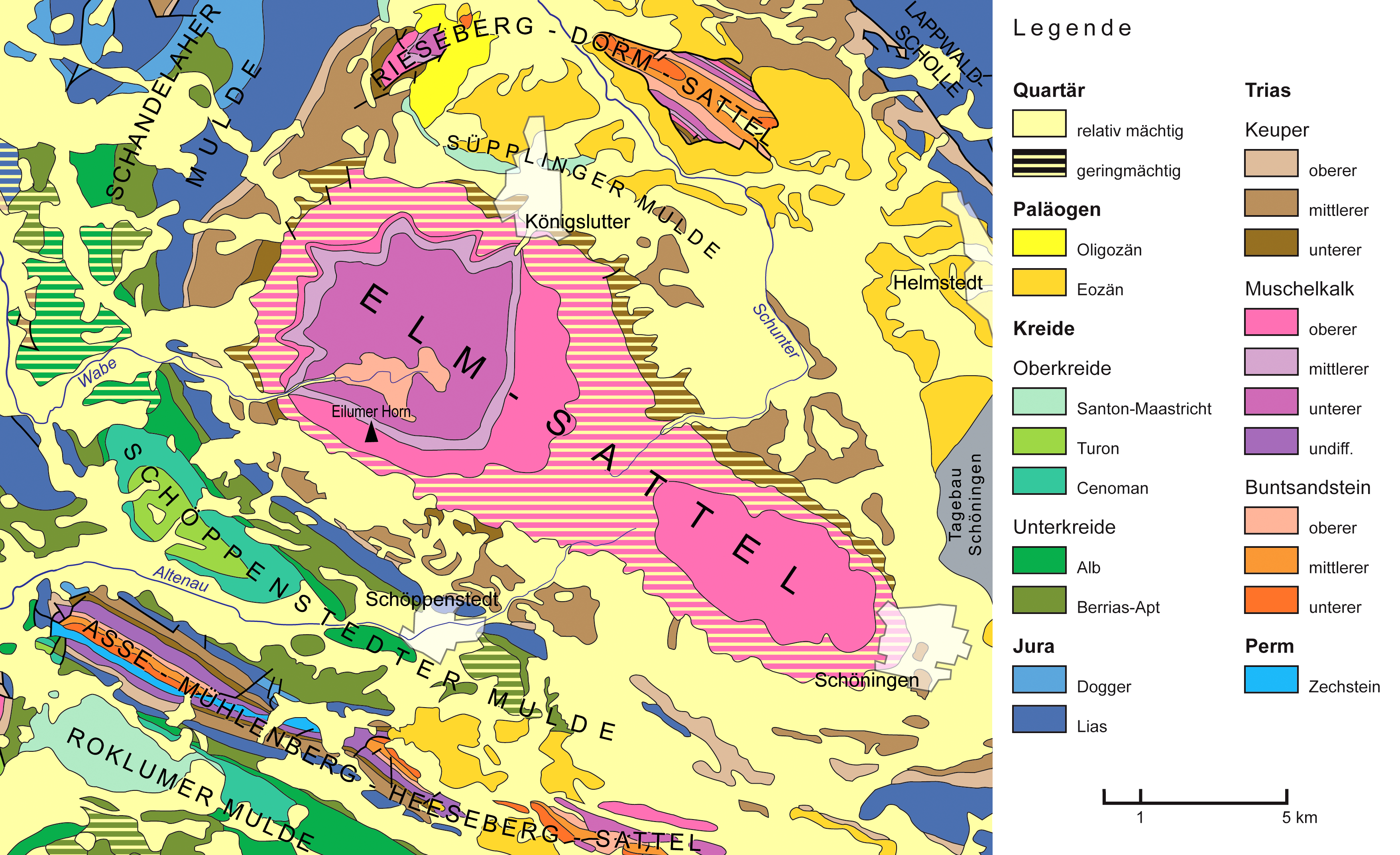
Eastern Brunswick

== See also ==
- List of fossiliferous stratigraphic units in Denmark
- List of fossiliferous stratigraphic units in Germany
- List of fossiliferous stratigraphic units in the Netherlands
- List of fossiliferous stratigraphic units in Poland
- Rio do Rasto Formation, contemporaneous fossiliferous formation of the Paraná Basin, Brazil
- Copperfields Mine of Canada
- Copper Country of Michigan
- Chuquicamata of Chile
- Copperbelt Province of Zambia
- Old Adaminaby and Lake Eucumbene of Australia
