= K14-K18 gas fields =

Series of gas fields in the North Sea

- Country: Netherlands
- Region: North Sea
- Location/blocks: K14, K15, K16, K17, K18
- Offshore/onshore: Offshore
- Operators: NAM, Wintershall

Field history
- Discovery: 1970 - 2005
- Start of production: 1977

Production
- Producing formations: Rotliegendes / Zeckstein

The K14-K18 gas fields are significant natural gas producing areas in the Netherlands sector of the North Sea, about 120 km north west of Den Helder. These five contiguous fields started producing gas in 1977 and are still operational.

== The fields ==
The K14-K18 gas fields are located in the Southern North Sea. They extend over the Netherlands Offshore Blocks K14, K15, K16, K17 and K18. The gas reservoirs have the following properties:

K14-K18 field gas reservoir parameters
Block	K14	K15-A	K15-B	K16	K17	K18-FB	K18 Golf
Producing horizon	Rotliegendes sandstone	Rotliegendes sandstone	Rotliegendes sandstone	Zechstein 3 carbonates	Slochteren Formation	Slochteren Formation	Rotliegendes sandstone
Depth, metres	3,025	3,325	3,900	2,001	2,686	4,217	3,750
Type of gas		High calorific value (CV)	Low CV & 24% CO_{2}	38.19 MJ/m^{3}, 10.05 % nitrogen	34.69 MJ/m^{3}, 10.6 % nitrogen	35.8 MJ/m^{3}, 10.79 % nitrogen	
Recoverable reserves	424 billion cubic feet	353 billion cubic feet	671 billion cubic feet	0.5 billion m^{3}	2.3 billion m^{3}	0.5 to 1.0 billion m^{3}	
Discovery	1970	1974	1975	1987	1980	1992	2005
Initial operator	Nederlandse Aardolie Maatschappij BV (NAM)	NAM	NAM	ELF Petroland (exploration)	NAM	Conoco (exploration)	Wintershall Noordzee BV

== Development ==
The K14-K18 reservoirs were developed over an extended period by a number of offshore installations across the five Blocks.

=== K14 and K15 installations ===
The initial installations in blocks K14 and K15 were:

K14 and K15 Field Initial Offshore Installations
Installation	K14-FA1	K14-FA1-C	K15-FA1	K15-FB1
Function	Drilling, production, accommodation	Compression	Drilling, production	Drilling, production, accommodation
Type	Steel jacket	Steel jacket	Steel jacket	Steel jacket
Coordinates	53°16’10”N 03°37’39”E	Bridge link to K14-FA1	53°14’53”N 03°59’41”E	53°16’35”N 03°22’28”E
Water depth, metres	26	26	27.4	26
Designer	Crest / MarCon	De Groot	Shell / Crest	Crest
Jacket fabrication	De Groot	THC	De Groot	NAPM
Deck fabrication	De Groot	De Groot	De Groot	De Groot
Jacket weight, tonnes	500	?	1,245	?
Legs	10	8	10	10
Piles	10	8	10	10
Deck weight, tonnes	940	Deck 2,250; modules 3,750	1,300	?
Accommodation	24	100	24	22
Well slots	9	Nil	6	9
Production throughput	7.4 million m^{3}/day	600 MMSCFD	7.4 million m^{3}/day	10 million m^{3}/day
Installation	February 1977	1985	December 1978	1982

Gas production from these platforms was to the following pipelines.

K14 and K15 pipelines
From	To	Length	Diameter	Notes
K14-FA1	WGT line	0.14 km	24”	Sidetap
K15-FA	WGT line	0.06 km	24”	Sidetap
K15-FB	Callantsoog	72 km	24”	

=== K14, K15 and K17 installations ===
The fields were developed further from the mid-1980s through five satellite installations.

K14, K15 and K17 installations
Installation	K14-FB1	K15-FC-1	K15-FG-1	K15-FK-1	K17-FA-1
Function	Satellite	Satellite	Satellite	Satellite	Satellite
Type	Steel jacket	Steel jacket	Steel jacket	Steel jacket	Monotower
Coordinates	53.16084 3.31354	53.25382 3.76408	53.30723 3.94825	53.21879 3.92062	53.06473 3.53866
Water depth, metres	26.7	26.1	25	25.6	25.6
Startup	1985	1989	1990	2002	2005

Gas from the K14-FB1 installation is routed to the K14-FA1 installation. Gas from the K15 installations is routed to the K14-FA1 installation. Gas from the K17 Monotower is routed to the K14-FB1 installation.

=== K18 installations ===
The K18 Golf gas field is a military restricted zone which necessitated development by subsea satellites.

K18 Golf Field installations
Installation	K18 G1	K18 G2	K18 G4
Function	Satellite	Satellite	Satellite
Type	Subsea	Subsea	Subsea
Coordinates	53.0923 3.5747	53.0923 3.5747	53.1023 3.5813
Water depth, metres	20.9	27.5	27.5
Startup	2011	2014	2014

The output projection was 375.7 million normal cubic meters per year. Gas is routed to the K14-FA1 installation.

The Kotter oil field is in Block K18, however there is no export route for the gas and the K18-FB gas accumulation has not been developed.

=== K16 Field ===
The K16 Field is a stranded asset with no nearby gas transport infrastructure. The field has not been developed.

== See also ==
- Helder, Helm and Hoorn oil fields
- Kotter and Logger oil and gas fields
- L4-L7 gas fields
- L10 gas field
- K13 gas field
- K7-K12 gas fields
