= List of fossiliferous stratigraphic units in Poland =

Group or Formation	Period	Notes
Alum Shale Formation	Cambrian	
Babica Beds Formation	Paleogene	
Baltów Coral Limestones Formation	Jurassic	
Basal Conglomerate Formation	Permian	
Besano Formation	Paleogene	
Beyrichienkalk Formation	Silurian	
Blaziny Oolite Limestones Formation	Jurassic	
Bodzanow Formation	Cretaceous	
Borshchov and Chortkov horizons Formation	Devonian	
Boruszowice Formation	Triassic	
Carboniferous Formation	Carboniferous	
Ceratiten Formation	Triassic	
Ciechocinek Formation	Jurassic	
Cieszyn (Teschen) Formation	Jurassic	
Czarna Shale Formation	Cambrian	
Czarnorzeki Beds Formation	Paleogene	
Czorsztyn Formation	Jurassic	
Drawno Beds Formation	Triassic	
Drzewica Formation	Jurassic	
Dubie Formation	Devonian	
Dursztyn Formation	Cretaceous, Jurassic	
Dziewki Formation	Devonian	
Folkeslunda Limestone	Ordovician	
Furkaska Formation	Triassic	
Gliwice Formation	Neogene	
Glowaczów Formation	Jurassic	
Gniew Formation	Poland	
Gogolin Formation	Triassic	
Gorazdze Formation	Triassic	
Gory Pieprzowe Shale Formation	Cambrian	
Greensand Formation	Cretaceous	
Grey Pelite Formation	Permian	
Grodziszcze Formation	Cretaceous	
Grodziszcze Conglomerates Formation	Cretaceous	
Grzegorzowice Formation	Devonian	
hardground Formation	Cretaceous	
Holy Cross Mountains Formation	Jurassic	
Holy Cross Mountains Group/Bahamite sequence Formation	Jurassic	
Holy Cross Mountains Group/Mt. Lysa Formation	Jurassic	
Ivane Horizon Formation	Devonian	
Jasna Gora Formation	Jurassic	
Jaworki Formation	Cretaceous	
Kadyny Formation	Poland	
Kadzielnia Formation	Devonian	
Kamieniec Shale Formation	Cambrian	
Kapusnica Formation	Cretaceous	
Karchowice Formation	Triassic	
Karchowice Beds Formation	Triassic	
Kcynia Formation	Jurassic	
Kielce facies Group/Dziewki Formation	Devonian	
Kielce facies Group/Kowala Formation	Devonian	
Kielce Platform Formation	Devonian	
Klonowka Shale Formation	Cambrian	
Kopieniec Formation	Jurassic	
Kowala Formation	Devonian	
Lecze Formation	Poland	
Leine Group/Grey Pelite Formation	Permian	
Leine Group/Main Anhydrite Formation	Permian	
Leine Group/Platy Dolomite Formation	Permian	
Leitha Limestone	Neogene	
Lissauer Breccia Formation	Triassic	
Lower Buntsandstein Formation	Triassic	
Lower Kock Beds Formation	Devonian	
Lower Muschelkalk Formation	Triassic	
Lukow Formation	Triassic	
Lychow Formation	Neogene	
Lysa Formation	Cretaceous	
Lysogory facies Group/Kowala Formation	Devonian	
Lysogory facies Group/Sosnowka Formation	Devonian	
Main Limestone Formation	Devonian	
marly chalk Formation	Cretaceous	
Middle Muschelkalk Formation	Triassic	
Mogilno Formation	Cretaceous	
Muschelkalk Formation	Triassic	
Muschelkalk Formation	Triassic	
Nawodzice sands Formation	Neogene	
Nerinea limestone Formation	Jurassic	
Niechobrz Formation	Neogene	
Niwki Formation	Jurassic	
Ocieseki Sandstone Formation	Cambrian	
Opoka Formation	Cretaceous	
Ostrava Formation	Carboniferous	
Pieniny Limestone Formation	Cretaceous	
Pinczow Formation	Neogene	
Pinczow Limestone Formation	Neogene	
Platy Dolomite Formation	Permian	
Podlasie Beds Formation	Silurian	
Poznan Formation	Neogene	
Przy Granicy Quarry Formation	Carboniferous	
Przysucha Formation	Jurassic	
Rezepin Beds Group/Winnica Mudstone Complex Formation	Silurian	
Rogozno Formation	Cretaceous	
Ropianka Formation	Jurassic	
Rotliegend Group/Ludwikowice Formation	Carboniferous	
Rudawa Group/Raclawka Formation	Devonian	
Samsonów Formation	Triassic	
Scaphiten-Pläner Formation	Cretaceous	
Set A Group/Kowala Formation	Devonian	
Skloby Formation	Jurassic	
Slowiec Sandstone Formation	Cambrian	
Smegorzow Coquina Formation	Jurassic	
Strassfort Group/Platy Dolomite Formation	Permian	
Suchacz Formation	Poland	
Swarzow Limestone Formation	Jurassic	
Szczawno Formation	Carboniferous	
Szydłówek Formation	Devonian	
Tatra Eocene Formation	Paleogene	
Telatyn Formation	Devonian	
Terrigenious Series Formation	Permian	
Tomanová Formation	Triassic	
Top Terrigenious Series Formation	Permian	
Top Terrigenous Series Formation	Permian	
Tremadoc Chalcedonite Formation	Ordovician	
Unnamed Formation	Carboniferous	
Upper Anhydrite Formation	Permian	
Upper Kock Beds Formation	Devonian	
Usarzow Sandstone Formation	Cambrian	
Uvigerina costai Formation	Neogene	
Vistula Formation	Poland	
Weglin Formation	Neogene	
Weglinek Formation	Neogene	
Wellenkalk Formation	Triassic	
Werra Group/Copper Shale Formation	Permian	
Werra Group/Lower Anhydrate Formation	Permian	
Werra Group/Lower Anhydrate A1d Formation	Permian	
Werra Group/Terrigenious Series Formation	Permian	
Werra Group/Upper Anhydrite Formation	Permian	
Werra Group/Zechstein Limestone Formation	Permian	
Wierzbica Oolite and Platy Limestones Formation	Jurassic	
Wilkowice Beds Formation	Triassic	
Wisniowka Sandstone Formation	Cambrian	
Wióry Formation	Triassic	
Wloclawek Formation	Cretaceous	
Wocklumeria Limestone Formation	Devonian	
Wolica Formation	Triassic	
Wysoka Turnia Limestone Formation	Cretaceous	
Zabijak Formation	Cretaceous	
Zacler Formation	Carboniferous	
Zagaje Formation	Jurassic	
Zalesia Formation	Ordovician	
Zaleze beds Formation	Carboniferous	
Zawiszyn Formation	Cambrian	
Zawodzie Formation	Jurassic	
Zbaszynek Beds Formation	Triassic	
Zechstein Formation	Permian	

== See also ==
- Lists of fossiliferous stratigraphic units in Europe
