= Kotter and Logger oil and gas fields =

Former oil deposits in the Netherlands

Kotter oil field
- Location within North Sea
- Country: Netherlands
- Region: Southern North Sea
- Location/block: K18
- Offshore/onshore: Offshore
- Coordinates: 53°04′56″N 03°57′57″E
- Operator: Conoco, Wintershall
- Owner: Conoco, Wintershall

Field history
- Discovery: 1980 (oil), 1992 (gas)
- Start of production: 1984
- Abandonment: 2015

Production
- Current production of oil: 25,000 barrels per day (~1.3×10^{6} t/a)
- Producing formations: Cretaceous/Jurassic sandstone

The Kotter and Logger oil and gas fields are mid-size fields located in the Netherlands sector of the North Sea, about 40 km west of Den Helder and 107 km north west of Amsterdam. The Kotter and Logger oil fields produced oil from 1984/5 to 2015.

== The fields ==
The Kotter oil and gas fields are located in Block K18 of the Netherlands sector of the southern North Sea. The oil reservoir is a Cretaceous/Jurassic sandstone at a depth of 7,500 feet (2,300 metres) and comprises two accumulations in Vieland and Delfland sands. The gas reservoir is an Upper Rotliegendes sandstone at a depth of 4,217 to 4,337 metres, below Zechstein salt.

The Logger oil field is in the adjacent Block L16 and is also a Cretaceous/Jurassic sandstone lying at a depth of 7,215 feet (2,199 metres), it has a thickness of 10 to 30 metres.

The Kotter oil field was discovered by Conoco in August 1980, the Logger oil field in March 1982, and the Kotter gas field in 1992, both also discovered by Conoco.

The properties of the reservoir/ wellhead fluids are:

Wellhead fluid properties
Oil fields			Kotter Gas field	
Oil property	Kotter	Logger	Gas composition and property	Value
API gravity	32°	34°	Methane	86.62%
Gas Oil Ratio	45 scf/bbl	48 scf/bbl	Carbon dioxide	10.79%
Viscosity	4.93 cP		Nitrogen	1.02%
Sulfur	Low	Low	Hydrogen sulfide	Nil
Oil in place		29 million barrels	Gross calorific value	35.8 MJ/m^{3}

== Development ==
The Kotter and Logger oil fields were developed though a number of platform installations.

Offshore installations
Installation	Block	Configuration	Water depth	Function	Type	Legs	Well slots	Installed	Production start	Production to
Kotter Production Platform	K18	Bridge linked	27 m	Processing, accommodation (50 crew)	Steel jacket	8	–	May and July 1984	September 1984	Helder A by 27.4 km 12-inch diameter pipeline
Kotter Drilling Platform	K18	Bridge linked	27 m	Drilling and wellheads	Steel jacket	6	24	April and June 1984	September 1984	Kotter Production
Logger Drilling Production Platform	L16	Bridge linked	33 m	Drilling, wellheads and production	Steel jacket	4	?	July and August 1985	September 1985	Kotter Production by a 19 km 8-inch diameter pipeline
Logger Utilities Platform	L16	Bridge linked	33 m	Utilities and accommodation (28 crew)	Steel jacket	4		July and August 1985	September 1985	

Oil from Logger was exported to Kotter. Oil from Kotter was exported to the Helder A platform and the combined flow sent to Amsterdam. Produced gas from both oil fields was flared. The K18-FB gas field adjacent to Kotter is a stranded asset with no gas transportation infrastructure and remains undeveloped. The Logger installation had a water injection capability of up to 4 injection wells. Injection water was transferred from Kotter to Logger through a 19 km 6-inch pipeline.

The Kotter production facility was originally designed for these throughputs.

Oil production	25,000 bopd
Water production	49,000 bbl/d
Liquids production	54,000 bbl/d
Produced water	50,000 bbl/d
Water injection	60,000 bbl/d at 180 bar

The Logger installation had a production capacity of 10,000 bbl/d of oil.

The K18 Golf facility aimed to produce 1.0 to 1.4 million cubic metres of gas per day.

The Kotter and Logger fields were originally owned and operated by Conoco until they were taken over by Wintershall. Production ceased in 2015 and the wells and installations were decommissioned and decontaminated. The platforms and jackets were removed from the field in 2019.

== See also ==
- Helder, Helm and Hoorn oil fields
- K7-K12 gas fields
- K13 gas fields
- K14-K18 gas fields
- L10 gas field
- L4-L7 gas fields
