= K13 =

K13 or K-13 may refer to:

- K-13 (film), a 2019 Indian Tamil psychological mystery thriller
- K-13 (Kansas highway)
- K-13 (missile), a Soviet air-to-air missile
- K13 gas fields, in the North Sea
- HMS K13, a submarine of the Royal Navy
- Keratin 13
- Nissan Micra (K13), a Japanese subcompact car
- Schleicher ASK 13, a two-seater training glider commonly referred to as the K13
- Sonata in F, K. 13, by Wolfgang Amadeus Mozart
- Suwon Air Base, established during the Korean War
- K-13, a fictional ski run in the South Park episode "Asspen"

== See also ==
- K-13 (k-to-13), a variant of K–12 education with a grade 13
