= On the State of Mining and Metallurgy in the Principalities of Bayreuth and Ansbach in the Year 1792 =

On the State of Mining and Metallurgy in the Principalities of Bayreuth and Ansbach in the Year 1792 (Über den Zustand des Bergbaus und Hüttenwesens in den Fürstentümern Bayreuth und Ansbach im Jahre 1792) is an early work by Alexander von Humboldt (1769–1859). In this publication, Humboldt provides a report on the condition of mining and metallurgical operations in the Principalities of Bayreuth and Ansbach (see also Ansbach-Bayreuth).

It is listed as one of Humboldt’s major works and was published in 1959 by Akademie-Verlag in Berlin, edited and introduced by Herbert Kühnert in collaboration with Oscar Oelsner.

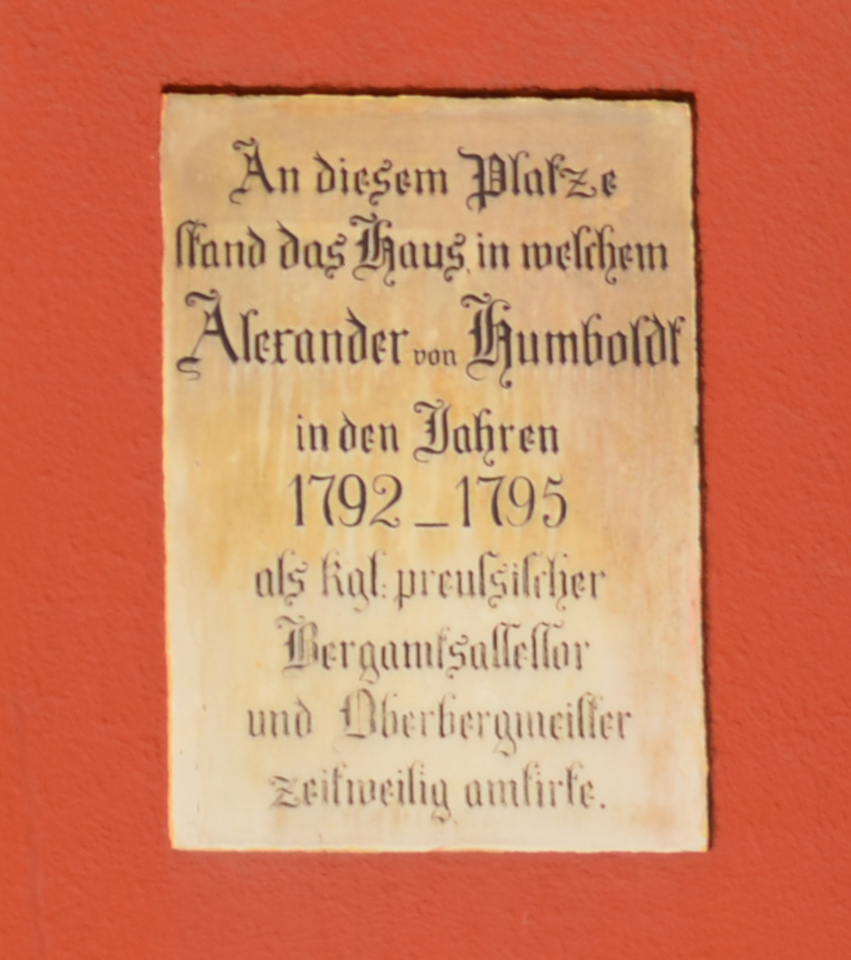
Inscription commemorating Alexander von Humboldt in Goldkronach

== Introduction ==
After completing his studies at the Büsch Academy in Hamburg, a commercial school, the young Humboldt submitted a job application in May 1791 to the Prussian Chief Mining Officer Friedrich Anton von Heynitz for a position in the mining administration. He completed his mining studies at the Freiberg Mining Academy in just eight months. During this time, he performed practical mining duties underground and participated in various study groups, including with Abraham Gottlob Werner.

The state minister Karl August von Hardenberg, who resided in Bayreuth, commissioned the newly appointed Mining Assessor Alexander von Humboldt to conduct a survey of the mines and smelters in the newly acquired Prussian provinces.

On June 4, 1792, Humboldt wrote from Berlin to Johann Carl Freiesleben (in translation):

I may leave for Bayreuth and the Fichtel Mountains in just three weeks. I have the honorable task of conducting a geognostic and mining survey of the natural characteristics of both margraviates. I have initially been given only eight weeks to travel through the area and provide the minister with a general overview. What happens next—whether I stay permanently (and become Chief Mining Officer!!) or go to Silesia—is entirely uncertain.

His assessment of the alum shale mining near the Heldenmühle close to Crailsheim was scathing (in translation): “The extraction of this alum shale seam is more irregular and unmining-like than anything I have yet seen in both principalities [Bayreuth and Ansbach].” He proposed (in translation): “4. The new adit as well as the proposed crosscut should be driven into the field as far as there is any hope of finding alum shale, and then mining should proceed from the back to the front, not the other way around, so that (even if the roof collapses) the space for haulage [and the escape route] remains accessible.”

In the local history of the “Alexander von Humboldt town” Goldkronach (in the Bayreuth district), Humboldt’s role in reactivating gold mining is remembered. Mining had been disrupted by the Thirty Years' War and never fully resumed afterward.

== Structure ==
The work is divided as follows:

Preface
On the geological structure of the mountains in the Franconian principalities and mining in general
On mining and metallurgy in the district of Lauenstein and in the mining offices of Naila, Goldkronach, and Wunsiedel
On the peat bogs in the Principality of Bayreuth
On the porcelain factory in Bruckberg near Ansbach
On the vitriol and alum works in Crailsheim and the mine at Heldenmühle
On the shortcomings of the iron industry in Franconia
On the geological structure of the mountains and the saltworks in Gerabronn
On the condition of the saltworks in Schwäbisch Hall

== Literature ==
- Alexander von Humboldt: Über den Zustand des Bergbaus und Hüttenwesens in den Fürstentümern Bayreuth und Ansbach im Jahre 1792. Eingeleitet und bearbeitet von Dr. Herbert Kühnert in Verbindung mit Prof. Dr. Oscar Oelsner. Akademie Verlag, Berlin 1959 (= Freiberger Forschungshefte. Herausgegeben vom Rektor der Bergakademie Freiberg. Kultur und Technik, Reihe D 23). – Online
- Douglas Botting: Alexander von Humboldt. Biographie eines großen Forschungsreisenden. Prestel, München 1974 (4. Auflage 1989)
