= K7-K12 gas fields =

Natural gas fields in the North Sea

- Country: Netherlands
- Region: North Sea
- Location/blocks: K7, K8, K9, K10, K11, K12
- Offshore/onshore: Offshore
- Operator: NAM, Gaz de France, Pennzoil, Wintershall, Engie E&P Nederland, Neptune Energy

Field history
- Discovery: 1969
- Start of production: 1978

Production
- Producing formations: Rotliegendes sandstone

The K7-K12 gas fields are significant natural gas producing areas in the Netherlands sector of the North Sea, about 130 km west of Den Helder. These six contiguous fields started producing gas in 1978 and are mostly still operational in 2021.

== The fields ==
The K7-K12 gas fields are located in the Southern North Sea. They extend over the Netherlands Blocks K7, K8, K9, K10, K11 and K12. The gas reservoirs have the following properties:

K7-K12 field gas reservoir properties
Block	K7	K8	K9	K10	K11	K12
Producing horizon	Rotliegendes	Rotliegendes		Rotliegendes	Rotliegendes	Rotliegendes
Depth, metres	3,150	3,300		2,770 3,080	3,160	
Type of gas	High calorific value (CV)	High CV			High CV	High CO_{2}
Recoverable reserves, billion cubic feet	247	720			189	200
Discovery	1969	1970		1973 and 1979	1971	1976
Initial operator	Nederlandse Aardolie Maatschappij BV (NAM)	Nederlandse Aardolie Maatschappij BV (NAM)	Gaz de France	Pennzoil	NAM	Placid
Subsequent operators			Neptune Energy, Engie E&P Nederland	Wintershall	Gaz de France	Gaz de France

== Development ==
The K7-K12 reservoirs were developed by a number of offshore installations across the Blocks.

K7-K12 Field Offshore installations
Field	Coordinates	Water depth	Installation designation	Function	Type	Legs	Well slots	Installed	Production start	Production to
K7	53°34’22”N 03°18’18”E	36.1	K7-FA1 Drilling	Wellhead	Steel jacket	4	9	April 1982 Deck	October 1982	Production platform, bridge linked
K7	53°34’22”N 03°18’18”E	36.1	K7-FA1 Production	Processing, accommodation	Steel jacket	6	Nil	April 1982 Deck		K8-FA1
K7	53.55142N 3.26727E		K7-FD1	Satellite	Steel jacket	4		1998		
K7	53.50125N 3.37038E		K7-FB1	Satellite	Steel jacket	4		2003		
K8	53°30’00”N 03°22’13”E	31.2	K8-FA1	Drilling, production, accommodation	Steel jacket	10	12	July 1977 Deck	March 1978	K14-FA1
K8			K8-FA1-P	Accommodation	Steel jacket			2001		
K8	53°30’55N 03°22’13”E	31	K8-FA2	Drilling,	Steel jacket	4	9	October 1977	September 1979	K8-FA1
K8	53°32’32N 03°25’25”E	35	K8-FA3	Satellite	Steel jacket	6	9	May 1985	1985	K7
K9	53.52193N 3.99382E	29.6	K9ab-A	Satellite	Steel jacket				1987	
K9	53.55295N 3.78426E	28.4	K9ab-B	Satellite	Steel jacket				1999	
K9	53.65442N 3.87426E	38.	K9c-A	Satellite	Steel jacket				1987	
K10	53.363714N 3.253964E	25, 29	K10-BD Wellhead	Wellhead	Steel jacket	6	12	July 1982 Deck	January 1983	Production platform, bridge linked
K10	53.363714N 3.253964E	25, 29	K10-BP Production	Processing, accommodation	Steel jacket	6	Nil	August 1982		K13-C
K10	53.404257N 3.288094E	29	K10-C	Satellite	Steel jacket	4	6	July 1982	August 1983	K10-B
K11	53°26’58N 03°20’34”E	29.4	K11-FA1	Wellhead drilling	Steel jacket	4	3	1980	Mar 1980	K8-FA1
K12	53°28’36N 03°47’19”E	29.5	K12-A	Wellhead	Steel Jacket	4	6	July 1983	September 1983	L10-A
K12	53°27’33N 03°54’21”E	27.4	K12-C	Satellite wellhead	Steel jacket	4	6	September 1984	October 1984	
K12	53.34304N 3.89692E	26.5 27.4	K12-BD	Satellite wellhead	Steel jacket				1983	
K12	53.34238N 3.8973	26.5 27.4	K12-BP	Production	Steel jacket				1981	
K12	53.460784N 3.905925E	26.5 27.4	K12-CC	Compression	Steel jacket			1994		Bridge link to K12-BP
K12	53.42354N 3.88651E	29.5	K12-D	Satellite wellhead	Steel jacket				1985	
K12	53.35712N 3.98373E	26	K12-G	Satellite	Steel jacket			2001		
K12	53.25221N 3.31354 E	26	K12-K	Wellhead platform	Steel jacket			2006	2007	
K12	53.4218N 3.825E, 53.34694N 4.9475E	?, 26, 46	K12-S1, K12-S2, K12-S3	Subsea wellheads	Subsea wellhead	–		1991, 2002, 2003		

The principal pipelines in the fields are:

K7-K12 Fields pipelines
Start	End	Length, km	Diameter, inches	Fluid
K7-FA1	K8-FA1	9.4	18	Gas
K8-FA1	K14-FA1	30.9	24	Gas
K8-FA2	K8-FA1	3.8	10	Gas
K8-FA3	K7	9	12	Gas
K10-B	K13-C	7.4	20	Gas
K10-C	K10-B	5.2	10	Gas
K10-C	K10-B	5.2	2	Methanol
K11-FA1	K8-FA1	6	6	Gas
K12A	L10A	30	14	Gas
K12A	L10A	30	2	Methanol
K12C	K12A/L10A line sidetap	0.4	10	Gas
K12C	K12A/L10A line sidetap	0.4	2	Methanol
K12B	L10A	22		Gas
K12B	L10A	22		Methanol
K12C	K12C	4.5	10	Gas
K12C	Sidetap	4.3	2	Methanol

== Production ==
Peak production from the fields was as follows:

K7-K12 Fields Production
Field	Production million m^{3}/day
K7-FA1	6
K8-FA1	9.2
K8-FA2	6
K8-FA3	3.5
K11-FA1	1.1
K12-A	2.7
K12-C	2.7

== Decommissioning ==
The K10 and K11 installations are now closed and have been decommissioned.

== See also ==
- Helder, Helm and Hoorn oil fields
- Kotter and Logger oil and gas fields
- L4-L7 gas fields
- L10 gas field
- K12-B
- K13 gas fields
- K14-K18 gas fields
