= Freieslebenite =

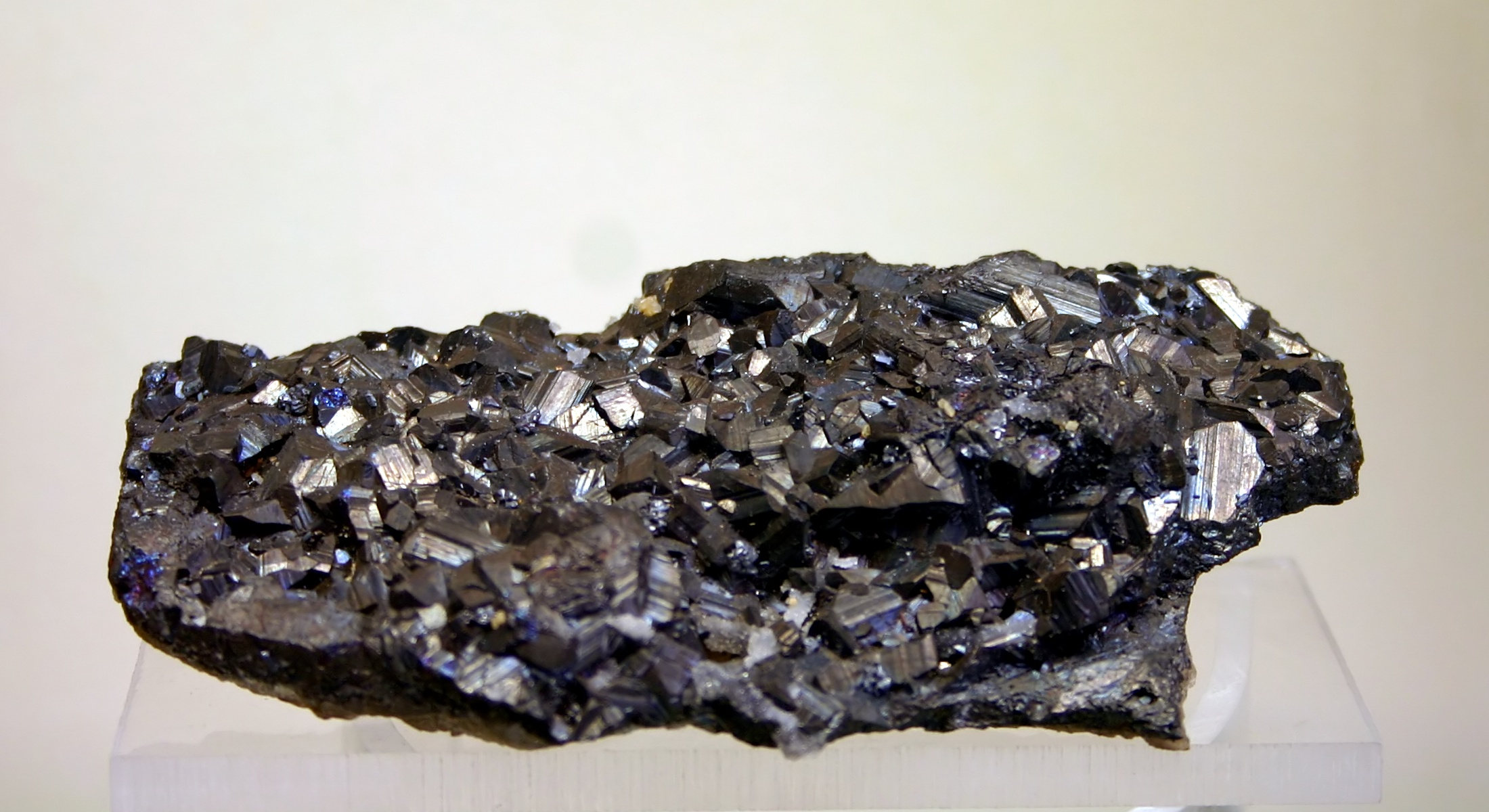
- Freieslebenite from Hiendelaencina, Spain. Exposed in the Mineralogical Museum, Bonn, Germany

General
- Category: Sulfosalt minerals
- Formula: AgPbSbS_{3}
- IMA symbol: Flb
- Strunz classification: 2.JB.15
- Crystal system: Monoclinic
- Crystal class: Prismatic (2/m) (same H-M symbol)
- Space group: P2_{1}/n
- Unit cell: a = 7.518(1) b = 12.809(4) c = 5.940(1) [Å] β = 92.25(1)°; Z = 4

Identification
- Color: Pale steel-gray to silver-white or lead-gray
- Crystal habit: Striated, prismatic crystals, inclusions and exsolutions in galena and other silver minerals
- Twinning: Twin plane {010}
- Cleavage: {110} Indistinct
- Fracture: Brittle-conchoidal
- Mohs scale hardness: 2.5
- Luster: Metallic
- Streak: Whitish-gray
- Diaphaneity: Opaque
- Specific gravity: 6.20–6.23
- Pleochroism: Very weak

Freieslebenite is a sulfosalt mineral composed of antimony, lead, and silver. Sulfosalt minerals are complex sulfide minerals with the formula: A_{m}B_{n}S_{p}. The formula of freieslebenite is AgPbSbS_{3}.

Freieslebenite was discovered in approximately 1773 in the Himmelsfurst mines of Freiberg, Saxony, Germany. The mineral was initially called Schilf-Glaserz; however, in 1845 it was given the current name Freieslebenite after the Mining Commissioner of Saxony, Johann Carl Freiesleben (1774–1846).

== Structure ==
Freieslebenite is a superstructure of a PbS-type substructure. The crystal structure is monoclinic with a space group P2_{1}/a, with a = 7.518(1), b = 12.809(4), c = 5.940(1) Å, β = 92.25(1)° and Z = 4(Ito, 1973). Sb has a trigonal-pyramidal coordination of S atoms, this structure isolates the SbS3 pyramids from themselves. The Sb–S distances are 2.431, 2.453 and 2.480(4) Å. Six S atoms are coordinated with Pb in a distorted octahedral arrangement. The Pb–S distances range from 2.806 to 3.167(4) Å. Ag has three nearest S neighbors at the distances 2.522, 2.575 and 2.687(4) Å. The AgS3 group is almost planar. A fourth S atom is at a distance of 2.928(4) Å from Ag, the Ag–S being closely perpendicular to the AgS3 plane (Cascarano et al., 1987). The crystal structure of freieslebenite was determined by Wuensch and Nowacki in 1967. Wuensch and Nowacki determined the crystal structure of freieslebenite using three-dimensional counter data, systematic consideration of all possible arrangements permitted by the subcell-supercell relationship and the method of key shifts (Ito, 1973).

== Physical properties ==
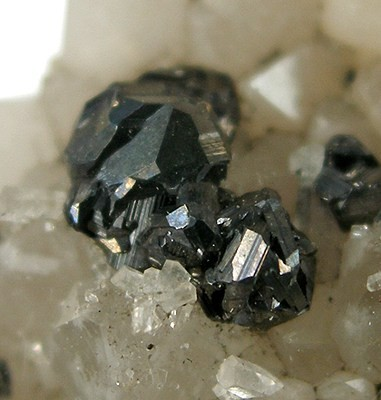
Cluster of twinned freieslebenite crystals on quartz matrix from Neue Hoffnung Gottes Mine, Bräunsdorf, Freiberg District, Erzgebirge, Saxony, Germany (Size: 5.6 × 4.4 × 1.9 cm)

Freieslebenite has a metallic luster and is opaque in transparency. The general colors for freieslebenite are gray, silver and white. It has a whitish-gray streak with a hardness of 2.5 on the Mohs scale. It has an imperfect cleavage and an irregular fracture. The density of freieslebenite is 6.20–6.23 g/cm^{3}.

== Geologic occurrence ==
The occurrence of freieslebenite is commonly found in hydrothermal locations. A major finding of freieslebenite was located in the Hiendelaencina mining district in Spain (Frias, 1991). Freieslebenite can also be located in North and South America and throughout Asia and Europe. Deposits of freieslebenite can generally be located in proximity with minerals argentite, siderite, freibergite, polybasite, and aramayoite.

== See also ==
- List of minerals
- List of minerals named after people
