= L10 gas field =

Gas field in the North Sea

- Country: Netherlands
- Region: North Sea
- Location/block: L10
- Offshore/onshore: Offshore
- Coordinates: 53°24′14″N 04°12′07″E
- Operators: Placid International Oil Limited; Gaz de France Suez; Neptune Energy
- Owner: Placid International Oil Limited; Gaz de France Suez; Neptune Energy

Field history
- Discovery: February 1970
- Start of development: 1972
- Start of production: 1976

Production
- Producing formations: Rotliegendes sandstone

The L10 gas field is a major natural gas producing field and hub in the Netherlands sector of the North Sea, about 65 km west of Den Helder. The field started producing gas in 1976 and was still operational in 2021.

== The field ==
The L10 gas field is located in the Southern North Sea. The field was discovered by Placid International Oil Limited in February 1970. The gas reservoir is an Upper Rotliegendes sandstone at a depth of 3,772 to 3,800 metres. The properties of the gas are:

L10 field typical gas properties
Gas composition and property	Value
Methane	84.75 %
Carbon dioxide	2.73 %
Nitrogen	6.1 %
Hydrogen sulfide	Nil
Gross calorific value	39.19 MJ/m^{3}

== Development ==
The L10 gas reservoir was developed by a number of offshore installations across the L10 Block. The L10-A complex is the hub of the field, it receives gas from its bridge-linked riser platform, from L Block satellite platforms, and from the adjacent Block 12.

L10 Field Offshore installations
Installation	Coordinates	Water depth	Platform	Function	Type	Legs	Well slots	Installed	Production start	Production to
L10-A Complex	53°24’14”N 04°12’07”E	28 m	L10-A Drilling Platform	Drilling, wellheads, accommodation	Steel jacket	10	12	November 1972	1976	Bridge linked to L10-AP
L10-A Complex	53°24’14”N 04°12’07”E	28 m	L10-A Production Platform	Processing	Steel jacket	8	–	1974	1976	Uithuizen by 178 km 36-inch pipeline
L10-A Complex	53°24’14”N 04°12’07”E	28 m	L10-A Riser Platform	Risers	Steel jacket	4	–			Bridge linked to L10-AP
L10-A Complex	53°24’14”N 04°12’07”E	28 m	L10-AC Compression Platform	Compression				1987	1987	Bridge linked to L10-AP
L10 -B Complex	53°27’28”N 04°13’59”E	27 m	L10-B Wellhead Platform	Drilling, wellhead, production	Steel jackets	4	6	1974	July 1975	L10-A by 7.0 km, 14-inch pipeline
L10 -B Complex	53°27’28”N 04°13’59”E	27 m	L10-BB Wellhead Platform	Wellhead	Steel platform	3	4	July 1980		Bridge linked to L10-B
L10-C Platform	53°23’38”N 04°12’08”E	26.5 m	L10-C Platform	Drilling, production	Steel jacket	4	6	1974	August 1975	L10-A by 1.1 km 10-inch pipeline
L10-D Platform	53°24’35”N 04°12’54”E	27.4 m	L10-D Platform	Wellhead	Steel jacket	4	6	1977	July 1977	L10-A by 1.15 km 10-inch pipeline
L10-E Complex	53°25’57”N 04°14’13”E	29 m	L10-E Platform	Wellhead	Steel jacket	4	6	1977	1977	L10-A by 4.1 km 10-inch pipeline
L10-E Complex	53°25’57”N 04°14’13”E	29 m	L10-EE Platform	Wellhead	Steel platform	3	4	September 1984	1984	L10-B to L10-A pipeline by 0.08 km 10-inch pipeline
L10-F Platform	53°23’13”N 04°15’39”E	26 m	L10-F Platform	Wellhead	Steel jacket	4	6	July 1980	January 1981	L10-A by 4.2 km 10-inch spur pipeline
L10-G Platform	53°29’28”N 04°11’48”E	27 m	L10-G Platform	Wellhead	Steel jacket	4	6	July 1984	August 1984	L10-B by 5 km 10-inch pipeline
L10-K Platform	53°29’38”N 04°16’14”E	27 m	L10-K Platform	Wellhead	Steel jacket	4	6	September 1984	1984	L10-B by 4.8 km 10-inch pipeline
L10-L Platform	53.337542N 4.377599E	27.1 m	L10-L Platform	Wellhead				1988	1988	L10-A
L10-M Platform			L10-M Platform	Wellhead	Steel platform	4		2000	2000	L10-A
L10-S Subsea completions			L10-S1, S2, S3, S4	Wellhead	subsea	–	4	1988 (S1), 1997 (S2, S3, S4)	1988, 1997	L10-AP by 6-inch flowlines

The L10-A complex also receives gas from K12-C/CC, K12-D, K12-G and K12-K platforms.

Gas from the field is transported through the 178 km, 36-inch diameter Noordgastransport pipeline from the L10-A Complex to Uithuizen. The design capacity of the 36-inch pipeline is 33 million cubic metres per day.

The field was initially operated by Placid International Oil Limited, then Gaz de France Suez, then by Neptune Energy.

== Decommissioning ==
In June 2020 Neptune Energy announced that it had decommissioned three platforms in the L10 Field. These were the satellite platforms L10-C, L10-D and L10-G.

In December 2020 Neptune Energy began a feasibility study into whether depleted gas fields near L10-A, L10-B and L10-E could be used to sequester carbon dioxide. The capacity of the reservoirs is around 120-150 million tonnes of CO_{2} and the annual injection rate would be about 5-8 million tonnes per year.

== See also ==
- Helder, Helm and Hoorn oil fields
- Kotter and Logger oil and gas fields
- K13 gas fields
- L4-L7 gas fields
- K7-K12 gas fields
- K14-K18 gas fields
