= Permian Basin =

Permian Basin is in geology the name of two large intercontinental basins that were formed in the Permian period:

- Permian Basin (North America), a basin in the subsurface of the south of the United States, in west Texas and southeast New Mexico
- Permian Basin (Europe), a basin in the subsurface of northern Europe, centred on the North Sea
