= Stumpflite =

Rare platinum mineral

General
- Category: platinum mineral
- Formula: Pt(Sb,Bi)
- Strunz classification: Pt(Sb,Bi)
- Crystal system: Orthorhombic
- Crystal class: Dipyramidal (mmm); H-M symbol: (2/m 2/m 2/m)
- Space group: Pbam (no. 55)
- Unit cell: 83.08 Å³ (Calculated from Unit Cell)

Identification

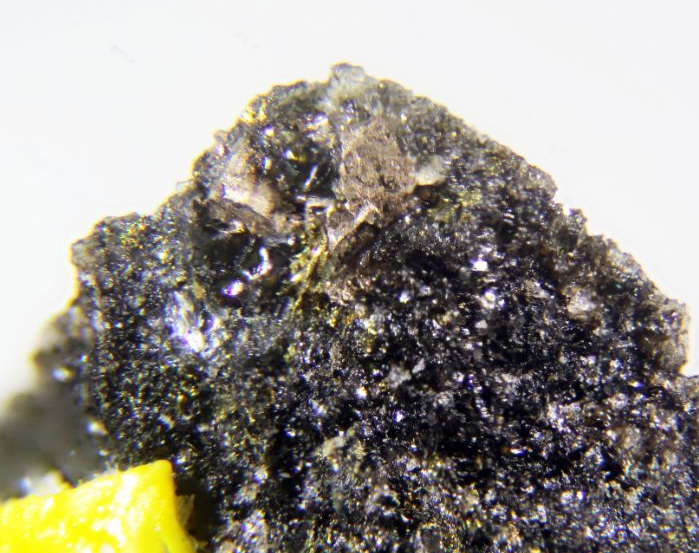

Stumpflite is a rare platinum mineral. It crystallizes in the orthorhombic crystal system.

== History ==
Its occurrence was first confirmed in the Driekop mine, Transvaal, South Africa.

== Etymology ==
The mineral is named in honor of Eugen Friedrich Stumpfl (27 November 1931, Munich, Germany - 12 July 2004, Innsbruck, Austria), professor of mineralogy, Mining Institute, Leoben (Austria), for his studies of noble metal compounds.

It was discovered in 1972 by Zdeněk Johan and Paul Picot.

== Physical properties ==
It has a silver white color. And it is metallic and isometric.

== Occurrence ==
It is mostly found in platinum concentrates from an ultramafic pipe deposit intergrown with geversite.
