= Auk oilfield =

Scottish oil reservoir

- Location within North Sea
- Country: Scotland
- Location: North Sea
- Block: 30/16
- Offshore/onshore: offshore
- Coordinates: 56°24′00″N 02°04′00″E
- Operator: Repsol

Field history
- Discovery: October 1970
- Start of production: 1975

Production
- Estimated oil in place: 88.5 million barrels (~1.21×10^{7} t)

The Auk Oilfield is situated 249 kilometres (155 mi) east, southeast of Aberdeen, Scotland, in block number 30/16.

== Reservoir ==
It was discovered in October 1970 in a water depth of 182 metres. The oil reservoir is a Rotliegendes sandstone overlaid with Zechstein carbonates and ls located at a depth of 2,316 metres (7,598 ft). Estimated ultimate recovery is 88.5 million barrels (14.07×10^{6} m^{3}) of oil. The oil has an API gravity of 38 degrees and a gas-oil-ratio of 155 scf/bbl.

== Infrastructure ==
The Auk 'A' platform was a steel, 8 legged jacket designed by Shell and constructed at Methil, Scotland. The jacket weighs 3,414 tonnes, it was installed in July 1974 and supported a topside weight of around 8,000 tonnes.

== Operator ==
It was operated by Shell, in 50% partnership with Esso until October 2006 when it was bought by Talisman Energy, and is now licensed by Repsol.

The field is named after the Auk a family of sea birds. Myles Bowen, Shell's exploration manager in 1970, had a keen interest in ornithology and began the naming convention of birds. There is an (entirely fanciful) legend that it was to be called A UK, as the first British oilfield, until somebody realised that the sixth field would be called F UK and Shell's policy was rapidly changed to name their fields after sea birds. Shells sixth UK oilfield is called Fulmar.

== Production ==
Production started in December 1975 from the Auk 'A' platform.

The topsides facilities included capability to drill, produce meter and pump oil. There were 10 well slots with 6 initially drilled. The plant has a capacity of 80,000 barrels of oil per day, Production start up was in December 1975. Initially production was to an ELSBM and then to the Fulmar Alpha platform in August 1986.The Exposed Location Single Buoy Mooring (ELSBM) has a height of 74 metres and stands in a water depth of 86 metres. It comprises a helideck, a mooring trunk, a mooring rope reel turntable buoyancy compartments and a ballast compartment. It is anchored to the seabed by eight 13.5 tonne anchors and 600 metre chains. It is supplied with oil through two 10 inch diameter hoses.

Associated gas from the reservoir was separated and used to power electrical generation with the excess being flared.

Oil production (in thousands of barrels)

== See also ==
- Energy policy of the United Kingdom
- Energy use and conservation in the United Kingdom
