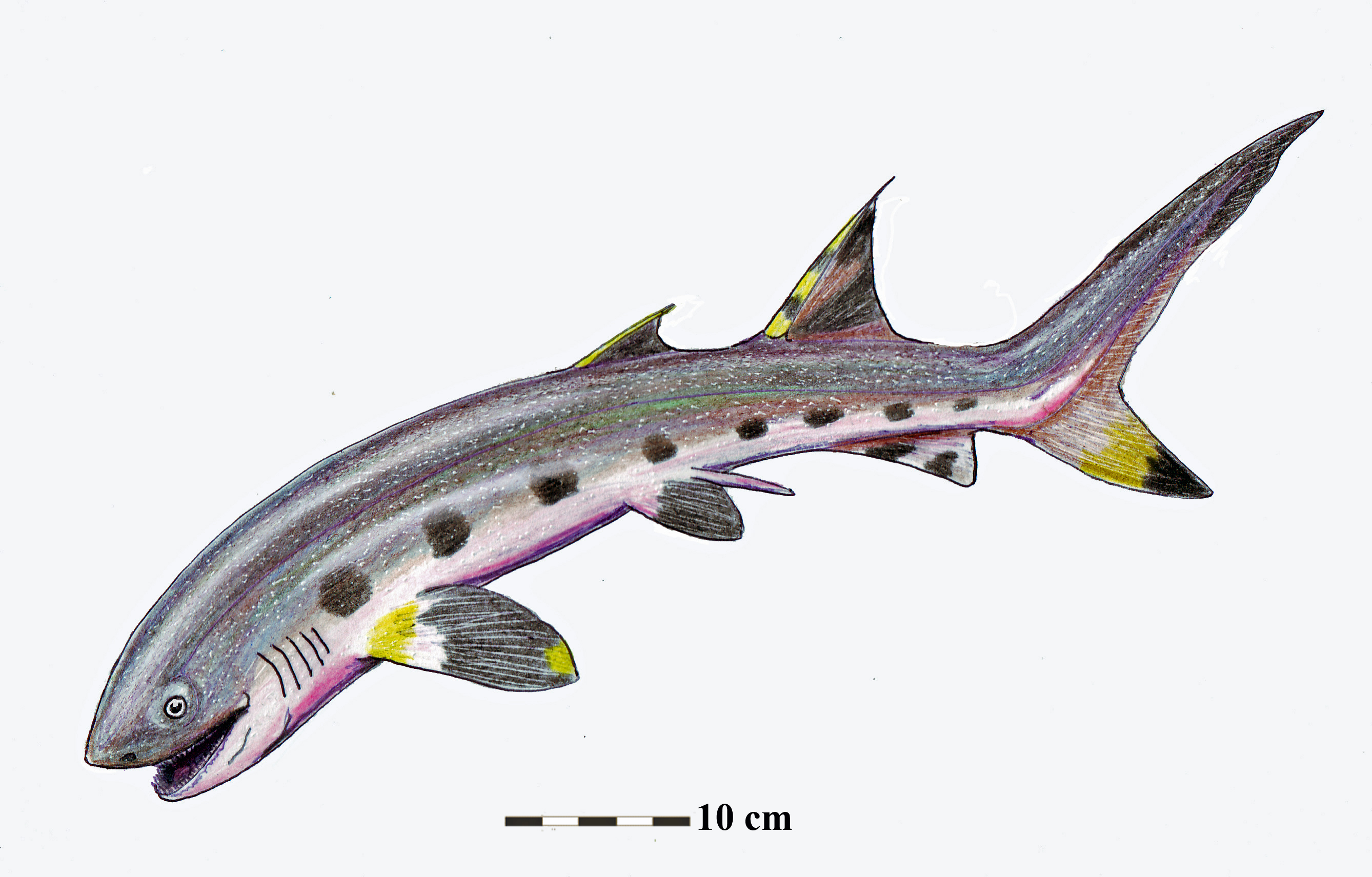
- Restoration

Scientific classification
- Kingdom: Animalia
- Phylum: Chordata
- Class: Chondrichthyes
- Subclass: Elasmobranchii
- Genus: †Hopleacanthus; Schaumberg, 1982
- Species: †H. richelsdorfensis

Binomial name
- †Hopleacanthus richelsdorfensis Schaumberg, 1982

= Hopleacanthus =

Hopleacanthus Temporal range: Permian

Extinct genus of cartilaginous fishes

Hopleacanthus is a Permian genus of cartilaginous fish from the Kupferschiefer of Germany.
