= K12-B =

Dutch gas field in the North Sea

K12-B gas field
- Location within North Sea
- Country: Netherlands
- Region: North Sea
- Offshore/onshore: offshore
- Coordinates: 53°20′31″N 3°53′49″E
- Partners: GDF Suez E&P Nederland B.V.

Field history
- Start of production: 1987

The K12-B is a natural gas field in the Netherlands sector of the North Sea (in the northern part of the country). It is located approximately 150 kilometres (93 mi) northwest of Amsterdam. Natural gas production in the field started in 1987.

To resolve the production-related carbon dioxide emissions issue, the project of re-injection CO_{2} into the gas reservoir has been implemented. In addition to the recovery of natural gas production, it serves also as a CO_{2} storage project. Several research projects use the CO_{2} storage project at K12-B as a source of data to validate models and gain insight into various related processes.

== See also ==
- List of oil and gas fields of the North Sea
- North Sea oil
- K7-K12 gas fields
