= Beyrichienkalk Formation =

Geologic formation in Sweden

- Stratigraphic range: Pridoli; ~423–420 Ma
- Type: Formation

Lithology
- Primary: Limestone

Location
- Coordinates: 50.0°N 10.7°E
- Approximate paleocoordinates: 14.8°S 1.8°W
- Region: Gotland; Ex situ: Brandenburg, Kuyavia-Pomerania, Mecklenburg-Western Pomerania, West Pomerania
- Country: Sweden; Ex situ: Germany; Ex situ: Poland

Type section
- Named for: Nodibeyrichia
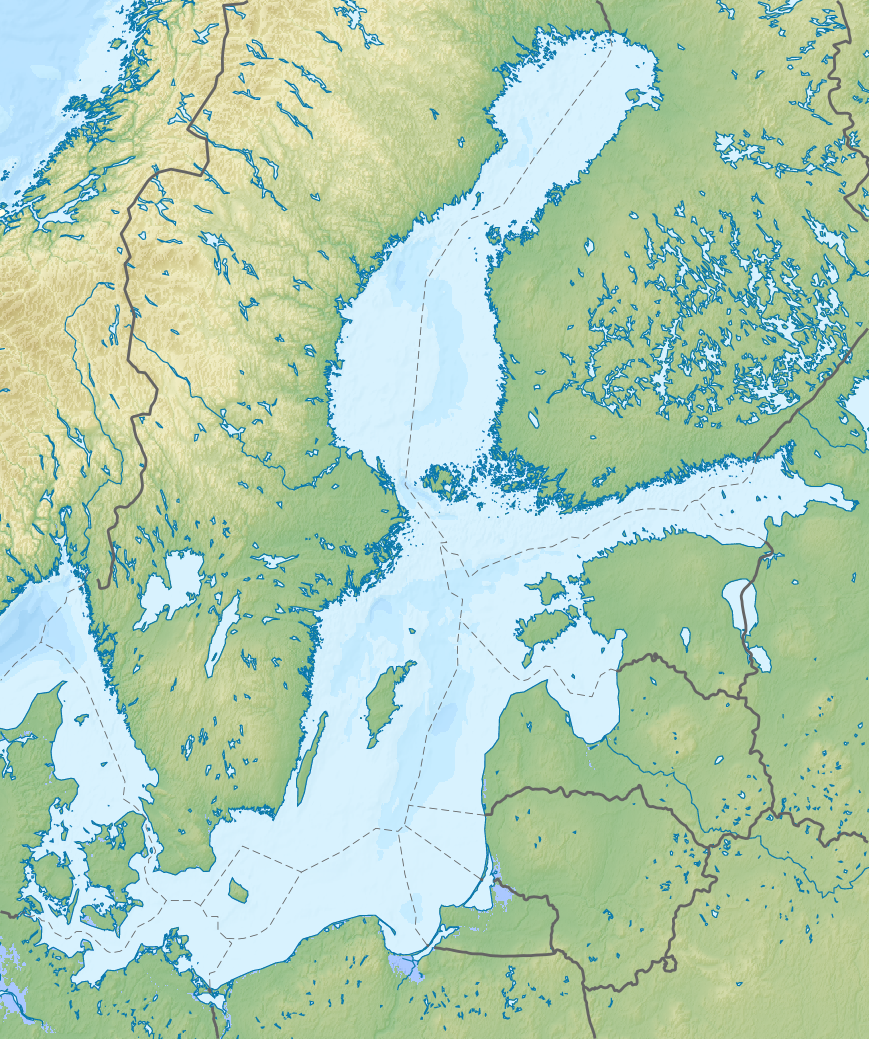
- Beyrichienkalk Formation (Baltic Sea)

The Beyrichienkalk Formation is a geologic formation in Gotland, Sweden. It preserves fossils dating back to the Silurian period. The formation is represented in erratic boulders found in:

- Oderberg, Brandenburg, Germany
- Voigtsdorf, Mecklenburg-Western Pomerania, Germany
- Międzyzdroje, West Pomerania, Poland
- Orłowo, Poland
- Vistula River, Bydgoszcz, Kuyavia-Pomerania, Poland

== Fossil content ==
The following fossils have been reported from the formation:

Cephalopods

- Spyroceras damesi

== See also ==
- List of fossiliferous stratigraphic units in Germany
- List of fossiliferous stratigraphic units in Poland
- List of fossiliferous stratigraphic units in Sweden
