= Eugen Friedrich Stumpfl =

Austrian mineralogist

- Born: November 27, 1931; Munich, Austria
- Died: July 12, 2004 (aged 72)
- Education: University of Innsbruck
- Scientific career
- Fields: Mineralogy
- Workplaces: University of Manchester

Eugen Friedrich Stumpfl (November 27, 1931 – July 12, 2004) was an Austrian mineralogist who discovered several notable minerals.

== Biography ==
He was born to Professor Friedrich Stumpfl and his Russian wife Dr Ludmilla Stumpfl in Munich in 1931.

He died on July 12, 2004.

== Education ==
He studied geology, Mineralogy and Chemistry at Innsbruck under Bruno Sander.

Eugen completed his PhD under the supervision of Paul Ramdohr in 1956 and stayed as a research assistant at Heidelberg University from 1956 to 1958.

He held several teaching and research appointments at University College, London (1958–1965), The University of Toronto (1965–1966) and The University of Manchester (1967–1970).

== Career ==
While teaching at the University of Manchester, Eugen undertook research on Apollo 11 and 12 samples and then moved to the chair at the University of Hamburg (1970–1975) and then the chair at the Mining University of Austria, Leoben (1976–1997).

After retirement, Eugen stayed in Leoben, Austria, and continued to be even more active in mineralogy research.

== Legacy ==
He has made significant contributions to the fields of mineralogy and geochemistry.

Two minerals are named in his honour:

- Eugenite
- Stumpflite

== See also ==
- List of minerals named after people
- Eugenite
- Stumpflite
