= K13 gas fields =

Former gas production fields in the Netherlands

- Country: Netherlands
- Region: Southern North Sea
- Location/blocks: K13
- Offshore/onshore: offshore
- Coordinates: 53°13’06”N 03°13’14”E
- Operator: Pennzoil, Wintershall

Field history
- Discovery: 1972
- Start of production: 1975

Production
- Producing formations: Bunter sands and Rotliegendes

The K13 gas fields were major natural gas producing fields in the Netherlands sector of the North Sea, about 130 km west of Den Helder. The fields started producing gas in 1975 but are no longer operational except for one installation used as a riser platform.

== The fields ==
The K13 gas fields are located in the Southern North Sea. The K13 A field was discovered in 1972, followed by the B field in 1973, the E field in 1976 and the F field in 1977. The gas reservoirs have the following properties:

K13 field typical gas properties
	K13–A	K13–B	K13–C	K13–D
Producing horizon	Middle Bunter sand (Triassic)	Middle Bunter sand (Triassic)	Rotliegendes sandstone (Permian)	Rotliegendes sandstone (Permian)
Depth, metres	1,500	1,300	2,600	2,500

== Development ==
The K13 reservoirs were developed by a number of offshore installations across the K13 Block. The K13-A complex was the hub of the field, it received gas from its bridge-linked riser platform and from K13 Block satellite platforms. The K13–C installation received gas from platform K10–B.

K13 Field Offshore installations
Field	Coordinates	Water depth	Platform	Function	Type	Legs	Well slots	Installed (jacket & topsides)	Production start	Production to
K13–A	53°13’06”N 03°13’14”E	28	K13–A Wellhead	Drilling and wellhead	Steel jacket	4	9	September 1974, October 1975	February 1976	K13–A Production via bridge
K13–A		28	K13–A Production	Production, accommodation	Steel jacket	8	0	May and October 1975	February 1975	Balgzand
K13–B	53°15’56”N 03°06’57”E	25	K13–B Satellite	Satellite	Steel jacket	4	6	August 1976	July 1977	K13–A
K13–C		24	K13–C Wellhead	Drilling and wellhead	Steel jacket	4	9	September 1977, July 1978	October 1978	K13–C Production via bridge
K13–C		24	K13–C Production	Production, accommodation	Steel jacket	6	0	April and July 1978	October 1978	K13–A
K13–D		26	K13–D Satellite	Satellite	Steel jacket	4	6	April and July 1978	October 1978	K13–C

The K13-C complex also received gas from K10-B.

The pipelines in the field were:

K13 Field pipelines
Start	End	Length, km	Diameter, inches	Fluid
K13–A	Balgzand	129.6	36	Gas
K13–B	K13–A	8.7	10	Gas
K13–B	K13–A	8.7	2	Methanol
K13–C	K13–A	10.3	20	Gas
K13–D	K13–C	3.2	10	Gas

The main 36” gas pipeline had a capacity of 39 million cubic metres per day.

== Production ==
The process plant on K13–A comprises 2 trains each with one 3-phase separator. Gas flows through a suction scrubber to a 4,500 horse power compressor then via a filter separator to a gas/glycol contact tower. Condensate is pumped into the gas pipeline, water is discharged to the sea.

The process plant on K13–C comprises 2 trains each with one 3-phase separator. Gas flows through a suction scrubber to a 4,500 horse power compressor then via a filter separator to a gas/glycol contact tower. Condensate is pumped into the gas pipeline, water is discharged to the sea.

Peak production from the field was as follows (million standard cubic feet per day) in 1979:

K13 Field Production
Field	Production MMSCFD
K13–A	200
K13–B	100
K13–C	200
K13–D	130

In 1986 the K13 field produced 824.2 million cubic metres of gas.

Since 1992 gas production from the Markham gas field has been routed via K13.

== Decommissioning ==
In 1988 the five wells on production platform K13-D were plugged and abandoned. The same year, the topside of K13-D was moved to a new location in Netherland sector L8 becoming production platform L8-H.

The K13B jacket was lifted out of the field in 1997.

There is no longer any production from the original field or its satellite platforms. but K13–A is used as a bypass platform to treat and transport gas from the J6-A production platform (Centrica) and the K5-A production platform (Total) via the WestGas Transport gas pipeline to Den Helder. Since 2019, K13-A is a normally unmanned platform.

== See also ==
- Helder, Helm and Hoorn oil fields
- Kotter and Logger oil and gas fields
- L4-L7 gas fields
- L10 gas field
- K7-K12 gas fields
- K14-K18 gas fields
