= L4-L7 gas fields =

Significant natural gas producing fields in the Netherlands

- Country: Netherlands
- Region: North Sea
- Location/blocks: L4 and L7
- Offshore/onshore: Offshore
- Coordinates: 53°32′18″N 04°12′9″E
- Operator: Petroland BV, then Total
- Owner: Petroland BV, then Total

Field history
- Discovery: 1973
- Start of production: 1977
- Peak of production: 135 MMSCFD

Production
- Recoverable gas: 1,470×10^{9} cu ft (42×10^{9} m^{3})

The L4-L7 gas fields are significant natural gas producing fields in the Netherlands sectors L4 and L7 of the North Sea. They are operationally one complex which started producing gas from the L7 main platform hub in 1977 and was still partly operational in 2021.

== The fields ==
The adjacent Block L4 and L7 gas fields are located in the Southern North Sea. The L7 gas field was discovered in 1973 and the L4 field the following year. The gas reservoirs are Upper Rotliegendes sandstones, L7 lies at a depth of 12,700 feet (3,900 metres). The L7 field had recoverable reserves of 1.47 trillion cubic feet.

== Development ==
The L4-L7 reservoirs were developed by a number of offshore installations across both Blocks. The L7 main platform complex was the hub of the fields, it received gas from its bridge-linked drilling/wellhead (C) and compression (PK) platforms, from L7 Block satellite platforms, and from the adjacent Block L4.

L4-L7 Fields Offshore installations
Installation	Coordinates	Water depth	Platform	Function	Type	Legs	Well slots	Installed	Production start	Production to	Status
L7 main platform complex (bridge linked)	53°32’18”N 04°12’9”E	27.5 m	L7-C Platform	Drilling, production	Steel jacket	4	6	April 1976	June 1977	L7-P	Closed
L7 main platform complex (bridge linked)	53°32’18”N 04°12’9”E	27.5 m	L7-P Platform	Processing	Steel jacket	8	–	1976	June 1977	L10 platform by 5.8 km 16-inch pipeline	Closed May 2017
L7 main platform complex (bridge linked)	53°32’18”N 04°12’9”E	27.5 m	L7-Q Platform	Accommodation	Steel jacket	4	–	1976	–	–	Closed
L7 main platform complex (bridge linked)	53°32’18”N 04°12’9”E	27.5 m	L7-PK Platform	Compression	Steel jacket	4	–	June 1982	1983	L7-P	Closed May 2017
L7B Complex	53°36’32”N 04°12’24”E	34.7 m	L7-B Platform	Drilling, production	Steel jacket	4	6	July 1975	1977	L7-P by 7.85 km 12-inch pipeline	Closed
L7B Complex	53°36’32”N 04°12’24”E	34.7 m	L7-BB	Wellhead platform	Steel jacket	4	6	September 1978	1979		Closed
L7A Satellite	53°36’01”N 04°05’01”E	34.5 m	L7-A Platform	Drilling, production	Steel jacket	4	2	August 1984	Late 1985	L7-P by 9.8 km 10-inch pipeline	Closed
L7-H	53.626389°N 4.144967°E	36 m	L7-H Platform	Wellhead platform	Fixed steel				1989		Closed
L7-N	53.573944°N 4.176776°E	32 m	L7-N Platform	Wellhead platform	Fixed steel				1988		Wells plugged 2015
L4-A	53°43’32”N 04°05’56”E	39.5 m	L4-A Platform	Drilling, production, accommodation	Steel jacket	8	6	Summer 1982	1983	L7-P by 22.7 km 12-inch pipeline	Operating
L4-B	53°40’36”N 04°00’06”E	38.7 m	L4-B Platform	Drilling, production	Steel jacket	4	2	August 1984	Late 1985	L7-A by 10.6 k, 10-inch pipeline	Wells plugged 2015
L4-G	53.81009°N 4.15805°E	42 m	L4-G	Wellhead	Subsea wellhead				2006		Operating
L4-PN	53.82341°N 4.0498°E	41 m	L4-PN Platform	Production	Fixed steel				1998		Operating

The peak production from the L7 field was 135 MMSCFD in 1978–9, and from the L4 field was 106 MMSCFD in 1983. The design capacity of the process facilities on L7-P platform is 5.5 million m^{3}/day.

The field was initially operated by Petroland BV, then Total.

== Decommissioning ==
The status of the production facilities is given in the final column of the above table. The entire L7 field is now closed as is the L4-B Platform. Operations continue in parts of the L4 field.

== See also ==
- Helder, Helm and Hoorn oil fields
- Kotter and Logger oil and gas fields
- K13 gas fields
- K14-K18 gas fields
- L10 gas field
