= Driekop =

- Location within Limpopo Location within South Africa
- Coordinates: 24.595°S 30.148°E
- Country: South Africa
- Province: Limpopo
- District: Sekhukhune
- Municipality: Fetakgomo Tubatse

Area
  - Total: 4.33 km^{2} (1.67 sq mi)

Population (2011)
  - Total: 3,487
  - Density: 805/km^{2} (2,090/sq mi)

Racial makeup (2011)
  - Black African: 99.9%
  - White: 0.1%

First languages (2011)
  - Northern Sotho: 91.2%
  - Zulu: 1.6%
  - Tsonga: 1.5%
  - Swazi: 1.4%
  - Other: 4.2%
- Time zone: UTC+2 (SAST)
- PO box: 1129
- Area code: 013

Driekop is a town in Sekhukhune District Municipality in the Limpopo province of South Africa.
