= Przysucha Formation =

Geologic formation in Poland

- Stratigraphic range: Hettangian; ~200 Ma
- Type: Formation

Lithology
- Primary: Sandstone
- Other: Mudstone

Location
- Coordinates: 50.9°N 21.3°E
- Approximate paleocoordinates: 43.3°N 19.7°E
- Region: Swietokrzyskie
- Country: Poland
- Extent: Holy Cross Mountains
- Przysucha Formation (Poland)

The Przysucha Formation is a geologic formation in Poland. Ichnofossils attributed to dinosaurs have been found in the formation.

== Fossil content ==
The following fossils were reported from the formation:

Ichnofossils

- Anomoepus pienkovskii
- Grallator (Grallator) zvierzi
- Moyenisauropus karaszevskii
- Anomoepus sp.
- Grallator (Eubrontes) sp.
- Kayentapus sp.
- Protosuchus sp.
- cf. Stenonyx sp.
