= Eugenite =

Rare silver mineral

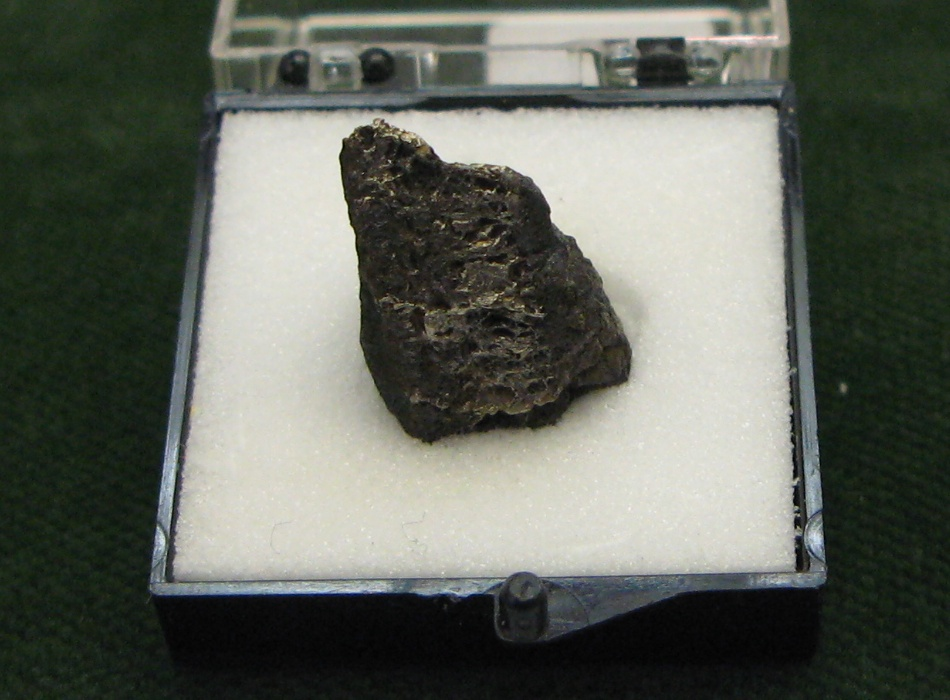
- Eugenite with Luanheite

General
- Category: silver mineral
- Formula: Ag_{11}(Hg_{2})_{2}
- Strunz classification: 1.AD.15c
- Crystal system: Orthorhombic
- Crystal class: Dipyramidal (mmm); H-M symbol: (2/m 2/m 2/m)
- Space group: Pbam (no. 55)
- Unit cell: a = 6.092 Å, b = 14.407 Å c = 7.811 Å; Z = 4 V = 685.55 a:b:c = 0.423 : 1 : 0.542

Identification

Eugenite is a rare silver-mercury mineral. It crystallizes in the orthorhombic crystal system.

== History ==
Its occurrence was first confirmed in the Sieroszowice copper mine, Lubin-Sieroszowice district, Poland.

== Etymology ==
The mineral is named in honor of Eugen Friedrich Stumpfl (27 November 1931, Munich, Germany - 12 July 2004, Innsbruck, Austria), professor of mineralogy, Mining Institute, Leoben (Austria), for his studies of noble metal compounds.

== Physical properties ==
It has a silver white color. And it is metallic and isometric.

== Occurrence ==
It is mostly found in cuprite and in low-grade copper sulfide ores in shale and carbonate rocks.
