= Aramayoite =

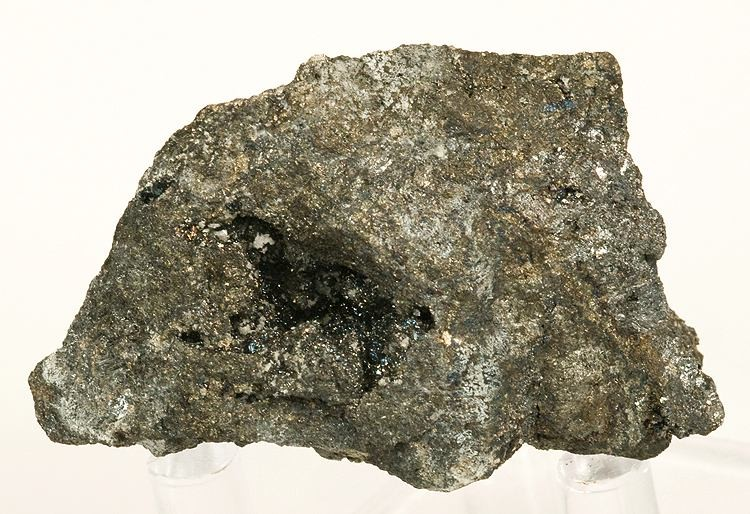
- Aramayoite found at its type locality

General
- Category: Minerals
- Formula: Ag_{3}Sb_{2}(Bi,Sb)S_{6}
- IMA symbol: Ary

Identification
- Color: Iron-black; deep red (transmitted light)
- Luster: Metallic
- Streak: Black
- Specific gravity: 5.602
- Density: 5.602 g/cm3 (Measured); 5.624 g/cm3 (Calculated)

Aramayoite (IMA symbol: Ary) is a mineral with the chemical formula Ag_{3}Sb_{2}(Bi,Sb)S_{6}. Its type locality is Sud Chichas, Potosí, Bolivia.
