= Helder, Helm and Hoorn oil fields =

Oil fields located in the Netherlands

- Country: Netherlands
- Region: North Sea
- Location/block: Block Q
- Offshore/onshore: Offshore
- Operator: Unocal Netherlands

Field history
- Discovery: 1979,1980
- Start of production: 1982, 1983

Production
- Estimated oil in place: 53.9 million barrels (~7.35×10^{6} t)
- Producing formations: Lower Cretaceous

Helder, Helm and Hoorn are adjacent oil fields located in the Netherlands sector of the North Sea 40 km west of Den Helder and 80 km north west of Amsterdam.

== The fields ==
The Helder, Helm and Hoorn oil fields are located in Block Q of the Netherlands sector of the North Sea. The oil reservoirs are Lower Cretaceous Vieland Sandstone with oils of various properties. The total reserves in the Q Block are estimated to be 53.9 million barrels. The fields were licensed to Unocal Netherlands BV.

Field properties
Property	Helder	Helm	Hoorn
Reservoir depth	1425 m	1271 m	1483 m
Oil column	40 m	87 m	102 m
Discovered	April 1979	February 1979	September 1980
API gravity	21°	18.3°	26°
Gas Oil ratio	90 scf/bbl	150 scf/bbl	100 scf/bbl

== Development ==
The fields were developed though a number of offshore installations.

Helder, Helm and Hoorn installations
Platform	Configuration	Water depth	Function	Type	Legs	Well slots	Installed	Production start	Production to
Helder A Wellhead	Bridge linked	26 m	Wellhead	Steel jacket	6	18	April 1982	September 1982	Helder A Production platform
Helder A Production	Bridge linked	26 m	Processing, accommodation	Steel jacket	4	–	April and August 1982	September 1982	20-inch 84 km pipeline to Amsterdam
Helder B	Stand alone		Wellhead	Tripod Tower Platform			July 1986	August 1986	Helder A Production platform
Helm A Wellhead	Bridge linked	26 m	Wellhead	Steel jacket	4	9	October 1981		Helm Production platform
Helm A Production	Bridge linked	26 m	Processing, accommodation	Steel jacket	4	–	April and August 1982	September 1982	Helder–Amsterdam pipeline
Hoorn Wellhead	Bridge linked	27 m	Wellhead	Steel jacket	6	18	April 1983	July 1983	Hoorn Production Platform
Hoorn Production	Bridge linked	27 m	Processing, accommodation	Steel jacket	4	–	April and July 1983	July 1983	Helder A Production platform 3.4 km 10-inch pipeline

Early years production (in 1000 stock tank barrels) from the fields were:

Field production
Year	Helder	Helm	Hoorn
1982	571	465	–
1983	3071	1709	2839
1984	4287	1222	5078

From 1984 Helder A received oil production from the Kotter production platform by 27.4 km 12-inch diameter pipeline.

To increase production, in 1991 Unocal drilled 5 horizontal wells and horizontal laterals from 9 of the existing wells in the Helder field. Prior to this programme the field was producing 4200 bbl/d, when complete the production had increased to 10,900 bbl/d.

== See also ==
- Kotter and Logger oil and gas fields
- K7-K12 gas fields
- K13 gas fields
- L10 gas field
- L4-L7 gas fields
