= Johann Karl Freiesleben =

German mineralogist and mining commissioner

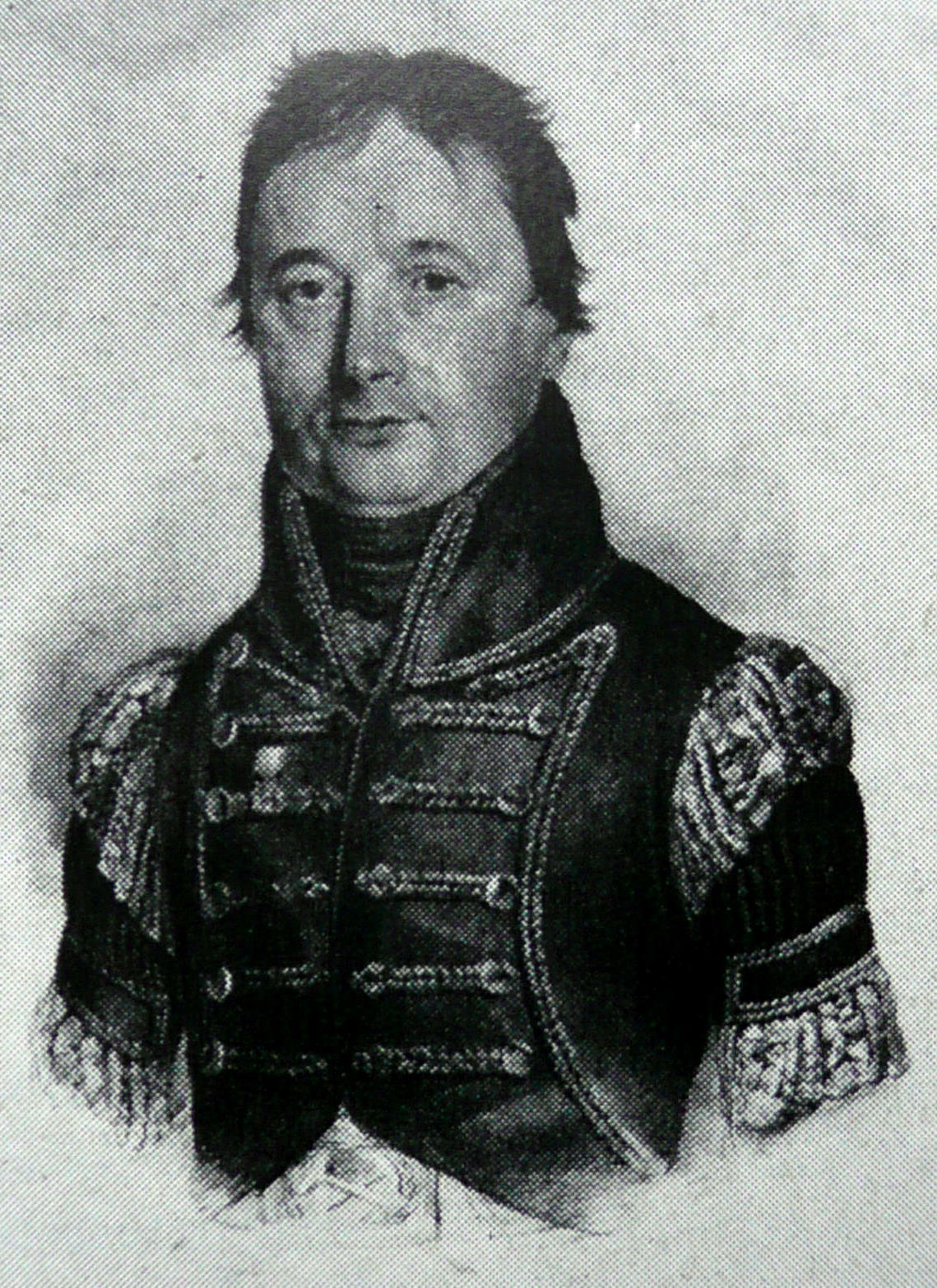

Johann Karl Freiesleben (14 June 1774 – 20 March 1846) was a German mineralogist and mining commissioner in Saxony. He was a childhood friend and correspondent of Alexander von Humboldt and was a promoter of stratigraphy and geognosy as taught by Abraham Gottlob Werner. The mineral Freieslebenite is named in his honour.

Freiesleben was born in Freiberg, Saxony, in a mining family. He went to study at the mining academy in 1790 where he became a favourite student of Abraham Gottlob Werner. He also became a friend of Alexander von Humboldt at the academy. Along with Christian Leopold von Buch, he travelled through Saxony and Thuringia and reported on it in a mining journal in 1792. He travelled with Humboldt to Bohemia and the Swiss Alps. In 1795 he discussed with Humboldt, they compared the rocks of Thuringia with those in the Swiss alps and concluded that they corresponded stratigraphically and called it Jura limestone which is no longer considered correct. He studied jurisprudence between 1792 and 1795 at Leipzig. He became a mining inspector in Marienberg in 1796 and then moved to Johanngeorgenstadt (1799) and subsequently oversaw the Mannsfield mines. He was promoted to Bergrath and then Oberberghauptmann in 1838 and received an honorary doctorate from the University of Marburg in 1817. He died while on a visit to Nieder-Auerbach. He began a periodical called Magazin für Oryktographic von Sachsen in 1820 in which he wrote about minerals in Saxony.

Freiesleben married Marianne Caroline Beyer in 1800.
