= Werra Group =

Geologic group in Germany

- Stratigraphic range: Permian
- Type: Group

Location
- Country: Germany

The Werra Group is a geologic group in Germany. It preserves fossils dating back to the Permian period.

== See also ==
- List of fossiliferous stratigraphic units in Germany
