= Permian Basin (Europe) =

Sedimentary basin of Permian age in Central and Northern Europe

Location of the European Permian basin. Pink lines show the extent of Zechstein evaporites and the red area represents the Rotliegend sedimentary and volcanic deposits.

The European Permian Basin is a thick sequence of sedimentary rocks deposited in a large sedimentary basin during the Permian period (from 298.9 to 251.9 million years ago) in Northern Europe. The basin underlies northern Poland, northern Germany, Denmark, the Netherlands, a significant portion of the North Sea to the east coast of England and up to Scotland.

A major natural gas discovery was made in the Rotliegend Formation at Slochteren, Netherlands in 1959. The Rotliegend is the lower portion of the Permian sequence and consists of over 600 metres (2,000 ft) of sandstones and evaporites. It is overlain by 1,000-metre (3,300 ft) thick sequence of evaporites known as the Zechstein Formation.

== See also ==
- Permian Basin (North America)
