= Zechstein =

Permian rock layers between the east coast of England and northern Poland

Permian of Central Europe (Dyas)

The Zechstein (German either from mine stone or tough stone) is a unit of sedimentary rock layers of Late Permian (Lopingian) age located in the European Permian Basin which stretches from the east coast of England to northern Poland. The name Zechstein was formerly also used as a unit of time in the geologic timescale, but nowadays it is only used for the corresponding sedimentary deposits in Europe.

The Zechstein lies on top of the Rotliegend; on top of the Zechstein is the Buntsandstein or Bunter. The Zechstein is associated with the accumulation of large amounts of salt rock between 257.3 and 251.0 million years ago.

== Formation ==
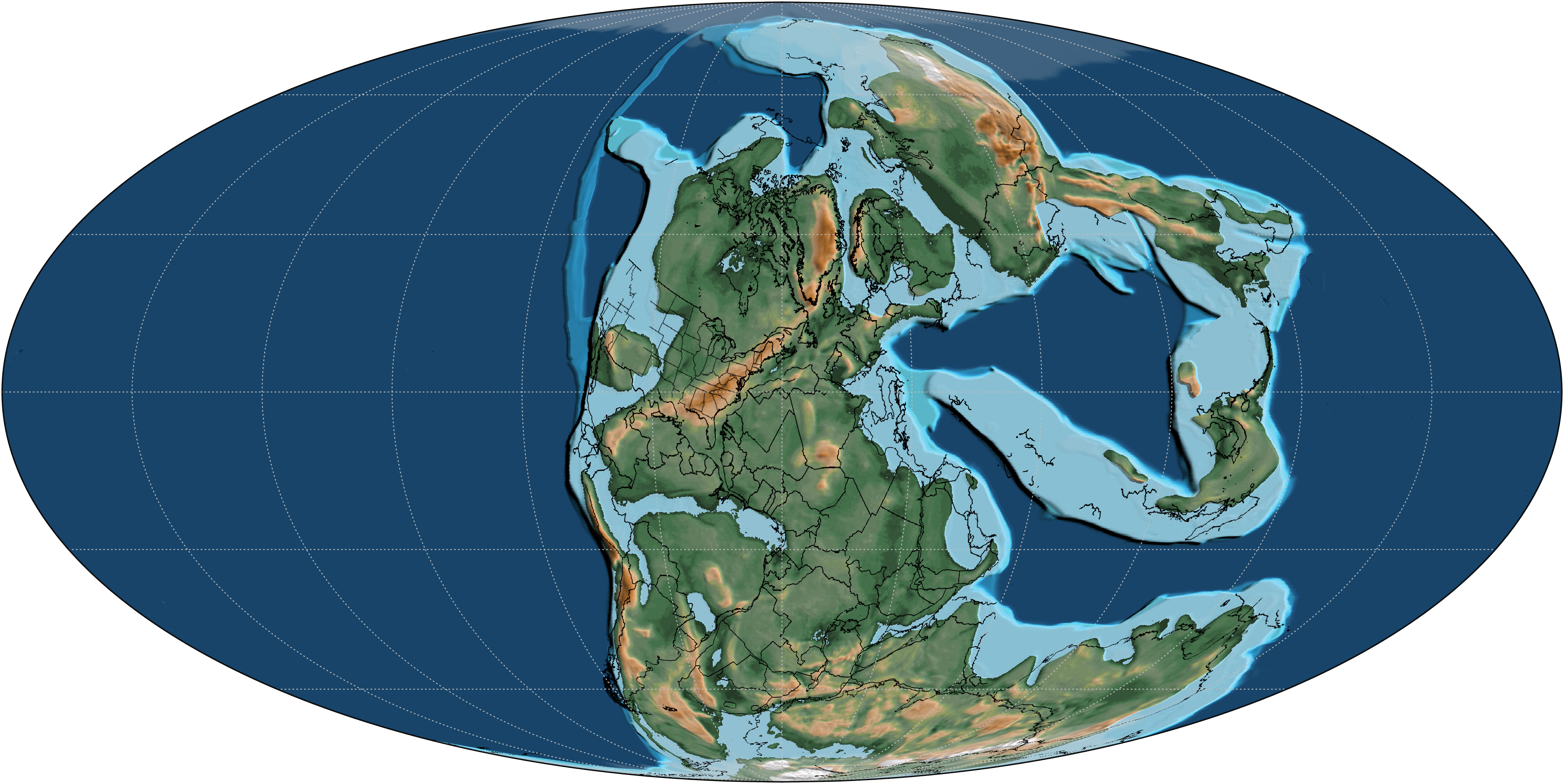
Map of Earth during the Late Permian, around 255 million years ago

The evaporite rocks of the Zechstein Group were laid down by the Zechstein Sea, an epicontinental or epeiric sea that existed in the Guadalupian and Lopingian epochs of the Permian period. The Zechstein Sea occupied the region of what is now the North Sea, plus lowland areas of Britain and the north European plain through Germany and Poland. The Zechstein Sea lay in the rain shadow of the Central Pangean Mountains to the south. At times the Zechstein Sea may have connected with the Paleo-Tethys Ocean through southeastern Poland; the point is disputed by researchers.

Though situated at the time near the equator (where high temperatures and arid conditions facilitated evaporation), the sea's inception likely stemmed from a marine transgression rooted in a phase of de-glaciation; the southern portion of Pangaea, the former (and future) Gondwanaland, supported ice sheets in the early Permian. The eventual disappearance of the Zechstein Sea was part of a general marine regression that preceded and accompanied the Permian–Triassic extinction.

== Stratigraphy ==
The Zechstein is usually given the status of a lithostratigraphic group and as such encompasses a number of geologic formations. It consists of at least five depositional cycles of evaporite rocks, which are labelled Z1 to Z5, respectively. The lithologies found are halite ("rock salt"), anhydrite, dolomite and shale.

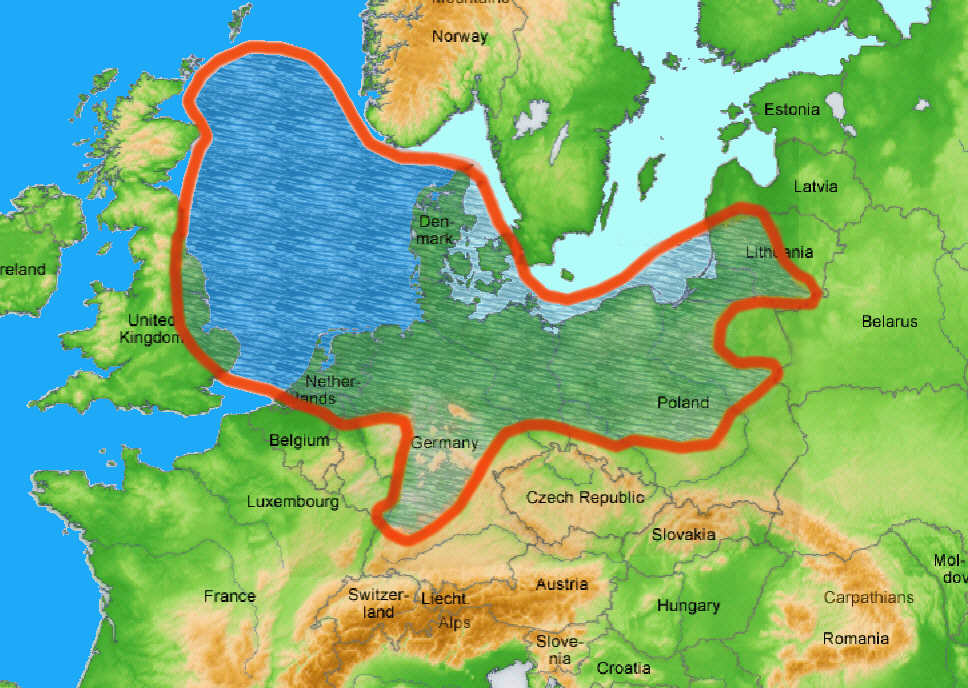
Zechstein Sea shown on a map of Northern Europe

== Economic importance ==
The Zechstein has significant economic importance in the North Sea Oil province. In the southern gas basin, it forms the main cap rock to the gas fields with Rotliegend reservoirs. It also forms a reservoir in the Auk oilfield in the central part of the North Sea. Further north, the Zechstein salt becomes diapiric, forming salt domes which form the structure for several oil fields, such as Machar. Zechstein dolomites crop out near the coast of County Durham, England where they are known as the Magnesian Limestone.

Just above the base of the Zechstein Group is a fairly thin layer of shale, or slate, where it has been metamorphized, known as the kupferschiefer for its high copper content. In its unmodified form, this layer is high in sulfur compounds that are typical of silt deposited in stagnant shallow marshland. Where faults have allowed mineral-rich groundwater to circulate through this layer, the sulfur has oxidized metal ions to metallic sulfide ores. From the Middle Ages into the modern era, this thin but widely dispersed constellation of ore bodies has been of immense importance as a source of copper across much of northern Europe.

The Zechstein salt layer is also used for underground gas storage in England, Germany and France.

== See also ==
- List of stratigraphic units in the Netherlands
- Marl Slate Formation
