= Rotliegend =

Geologic group in Europe

Permian of Central Europe (Dyas)

The Rotliegend, Rotliegend Group or Rotliegendes (German: the underlying red) is a lithostratigraphic unit (a sequence of rock strata) of latest Carboniferous to Guadalupian (middle Permian) age that is found in the subsurface of large areas in western and central Europe. The Rotliegend mainly consists of sandstone layers. It is usually covered by the Zechstein and lies on top of regionally different formations of late Carboniferous age.

The name Rotliegend has in the past not only been used to address the rock strata themselves, but also the time span in which they were formed (in which case the Rotliegend was considered a series or subsystem of the Permian). This time span corresponds roughly with the length of the Cisuralian epoch.

== Facies and formation ==
In large parts of Pangaea, the last phases of the Hercynian orogeny were still ongoing during the start of the Permian. At the same time local crustal extension formed intramontane basins such as the large Permian Basin which covered parts of present-day Germany, Poland, Denmark, the North Sea, the Baltic Sea and the Netherlands. The early development of the basin went hand in hand with volcanism. Apart from these volcanic deposits the basin was filled by the erosional products of the Hercynian mountains to the south: mostly sands and gravels deposited under an arid and warm climate.

== Stratigraphy ==
In the north of Germany and in the Netherlands, the Rotliegend is usually subdivided into two groups: a Lower Rotliegend Group (mostly volcanic rocks: tuffs and basaltic lavas) and an Upper Rotliegend Group (sandstones and siltstones). During the formation of the lower group the basin was still small and the deposition was restricted to the centre of the basin in the southeastern North Sea and northern Germany, this group is very limited in thickness in the Dutch subsurface. The upper group has a larger arial distribution since the basin had grown wider.

In Dutch lithostratigraphy, the Rotliegend lies on top of the late Carboniferous Limburg Group and below the Zechstein Group. The Upper Rotliegend Group is divided in the Silverpit Formation and Slochteren Formation, the last is an important reservoir for hydrocarbons. The German Bentheim Sandstone, which crops out in the Münsterland, is part of the Slochteren Formation.

The Rotliegend of northern Germany is continuous with that of the Netherlands. In other parts of Germany contemporaneous basins exist, such as the Saar-Nahe Basin, the Wetterau or the Saale Basin. The Rotliegend of these different intramontane basins is not easy to correlate and the lithostratigraphy of each basin has its own divisions (groups and formations).

== Bibliography ==
- Gradstein, F. M.; Ogg, J. G.; Smith, A. G. (2004). A Geologic Time Scale 2004. Cambridge University Press.
- Ziegler, P. A. (1990). Geological Atlas of Western and Central Europe (2nd ed.). Shell. ISBN 90-6644-125-9.
