= 2002 Bristow Helicopters Sikorsky S-76A crash =

Aviation incident in the North Sea

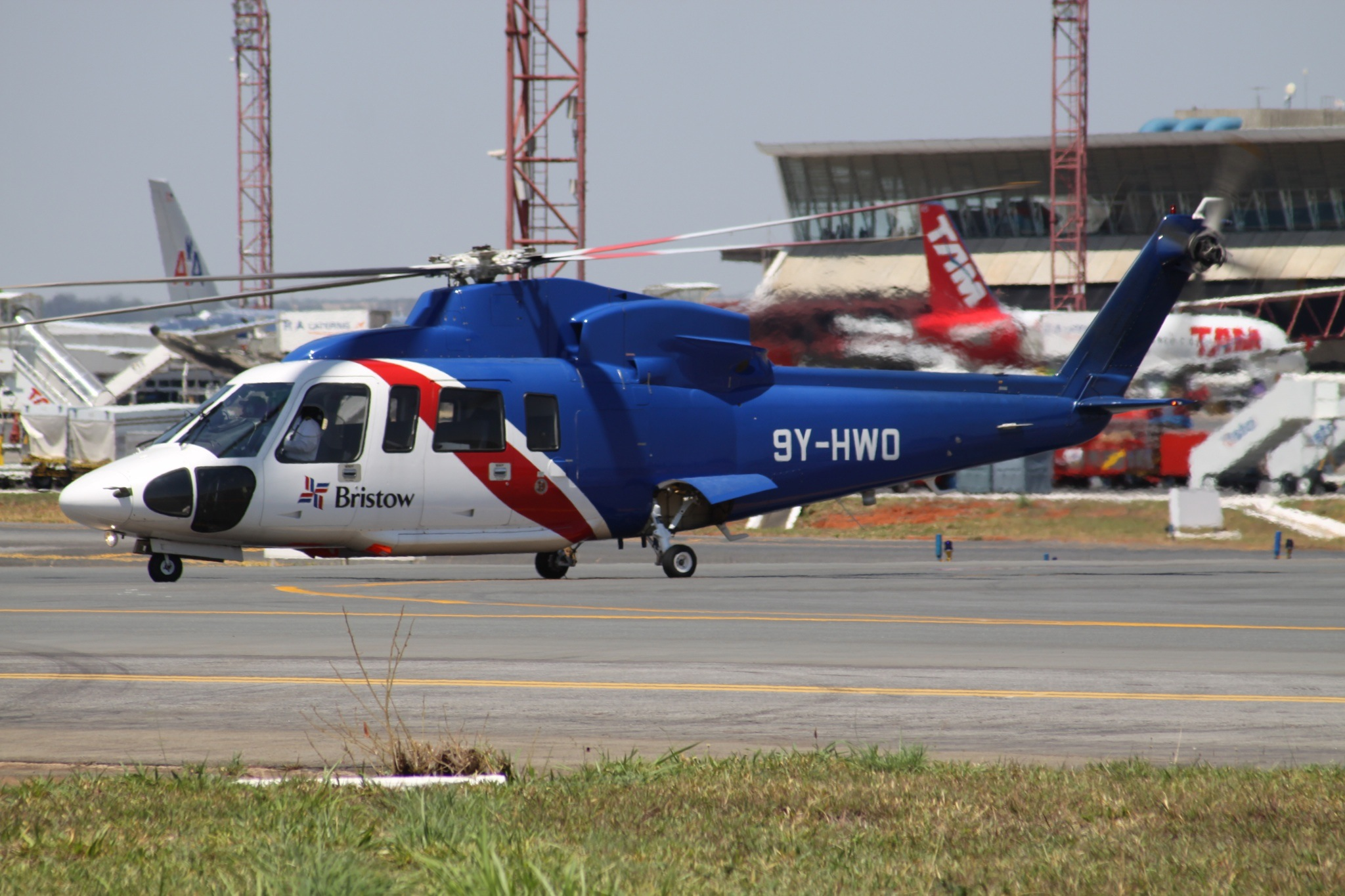
- A Bristow Helicopters Sikorsky S-76 similar to the accident helicopter

Accident
- Date: 16 July 2002
- Summary: Main rotor blade failure
- Site: 28 nmi (52 km; 32 mi) northeast Cromer, Norfolk, United Kingdom

Aircraft
- Aircraft type: Sikorsky S-76A
- Operator: Bristow Helicopters
- Registration: G-BJVX
- Flight origin: Gas production platform Clipper, Sole Pitt gas field
- Destination: Jackup drilling rig Global Santa Fe Monarch, attached to Leman 49/26 Foxtrot
- Occupants: 11
- Passengers: 9
- Crew: 2
- Fatalities: 11
- Injuries: 0
- Survivors: 0

G-BJVX, a Norwich-based commercial Sikorsky S-76A helicopter operated by Bristow Helicopters, crashed in the evening of 16 July 2002 in the southern North Sea while it was making a ten-minute flight between the gas production platform Clipper and the drilling rig Global Santa Fe Monarch, after which it was to return to Norwich Airport. All 11 people on board died.

Investigators discovered the accident was caused by the failure of a main rotor blade.

== Accident ==
The 22-year-old helicopter was flying at an altitude of about 320 ft (98 m) when workers on the Global Santa Fe Monarch heard "a loud bang". No witnesses were watching the aircraft at the time, but some saw it dive steeply into the sea. A witness also reported seeing the helicopter's rotor head with rotor blades attached falling into the sea after the body of the helicopter had impacted.

The accident caused the death of all those on board (two crew members and nine Shell workers as passengers). The body of the eleventh man has never been recovered.

== Search and rescue ==
The rig Standby Vessel, Putford Achilles, which was about 1.5 mi (2.4 km) from the location, immediately launched its two fast rescue craft, which recovered four bodies and some floating debris. The search was continued, resulting in the recovery of another body. Great Yarmouth Coastguard launched rescue helicopters and other vessels arrived on the scene that night, but no survivors or further bodies were recovered from the surface of the sea.

An underwater search for the six missing bodies began on 17 July. The debris field was located in 40 m (130 ft) of water by a remotely operated vehicle from the vessel Kommandor Subsea on 19 July. The Diving Support Vessel Mayo arrived later that day and began the recovery of bodies and wreckage, with five more bodies being retrieved. An underwater search for the remaining missing body was eventually halted on 23 July. A surface vessel search was maintained for two more days and an aerial search until 30 July, without success.

== Investigation ==
The wreckage, which included the helicopter's flight data recorder, was brought ashore at Great Yarmouth on 21 July, and transferred to an Air Accidents Investigation Branch facility near Aldershot, Hampshire, where it was examined by investigators from the AAIB, the US National Transportation Safety Board and Federal Aviation Administration, the aircraft manufacturer, and the operator.

=== Cause ===
The audio recordings from the Cockpit voice recorder revealed that the crew were unaware of any significant abnormality until the flight from the Clipper platform to the Monarch platform. About 4.5 minutes into this flight, they discussed an increase in vibration. The non-handling pilot carried out a "rotor track and balance" procedure; the increase in vibration did not cause the crew any immediate concern and the procedure was carried out to enable the Integrated Vehicle Health and Usage Monitoring System (IVHUMS) to log rotor track and balance data for later analysis.

Frequency spectrum analysis of the audio recordings indicated an increase in the amplitude of frequencies associated with main rotor vibration towards the end of the recording. The recording ended abruptly with three unusual, probably structure-borne, sounds.

Wreckage analysis showed that, while three of the main rotor blades exhibited only superficial damage, the fourth was fractured at a position approximately 76.75 in (1,949 mm) from the blade root, while the main rotor gearbox's casing was also fractured. Neither the gearbox nor the rotor head could be recovered. The rotor blade, which had been manufactured in March 1981, had been struck by lightning in 1999, when it was repaired by the manufacturer and returned to service.

After the accident, the AAIB and the helicopter's manufacturer, Stratford, Connecticut-based Sikorsky Aircraft, reached the opinion that the electrical energy imparted by the lightning strike in 1999 exploited an anomaly that was built into the blade at manufacture and damaged the spar. The Air Accidents Investigation Branch report stated that the manufacturers should have noticed the error, unless it was permitted by concession.

== Aftermath ==
Shell suspended North Sea helicopter flights by the operator for six weeks after the accident until 3 September 2002.

The inquest into the deaths opened on 31 October at the Great Yarmouth Coroner's Court and the jury returned a verdict of Accidental Death on 2 November 2005 on the basis of an AAIB report finalised during that year.

Earlier, in late 2003, the company Bristow had agreed to a compensation deal for five children, whose fathers were killed in the crash.

The names of the deceased are engraved on a glass porch in St Nicholas Church, Great Yarmouth.

In 2007, a Norwich coroner's officer launched legal action over claims he suffered stress following the tragedy, claiming compensation, stating he received insufficient support at the time of the incident and in its aftermath. A Norfolk police spokesman confirmed the traumatic nature of the 2002 incident for all those involved, the more so since it had occurred on the eve of a one-day general strike of council's workers in the UK and two days before a royal visit to Norwich.

== See also ==
- 1983 British Airways Sikorsky S-61 crash
- Aviation accidents and incidents
- Aviation safety
