= Petroleum Licensing (Production) (Seaward Areas) Regulations 2008 =

The Petroleum Licensing (Production) (Seaward Areas) Regulations 2008 (SI 2008/225) are a group of regulations passed for the Petroleum Act 1998 that set out model clauses of a petroleum licence agreement, as amended by SI 2009/3283. These are necessary for companies drilling for oil in the United Kingdom.

== Contents ==
In Schedule 1 of the Regulations, the model clauses are as follows.

- cl 2, for the grant of a licence payments are to be made
- cl 4, potential for discretionary decision by Minister on term of the licence
- cl 5, potential for ministerial direction that a frontier licence that is going to lapse should continue
- cl 7, power to determine that a first or second licence term should be extended
- cl 14, power to direct that measuring devices be tested, and find how long a fault subsisted
- cl 16, licensee’s obligation to submit work programmes
- cl 17, licensee obligation to submit production and development programmes (Gordon (2012) ch 5). Minister has the power to make directives relative to production and development.
- cl 21, power to approve a programme of Completion Work
- cl 23, Minister consent to potentially harmful modes of working
- cl 24, power to approve appointment of an operator
- cl 41, Minister’s power of revocation, upon breach of the license terms
- cl 42, Minister’s power of partial-revocation
- cl 43, arbitration clause. (1) This does not apply to anything to be ‘determined.... by the Minister’.
- cl 45, power to determine that debris is potentially dangerous to fishing industry and should be removed.

== See also ==
- UK enterprise law
