= Thames gas field =

Depleted natural gas reservoir

- Country: United Kingdom
- Region: North Sea
- Location/blocks: 49/28
- Offshore/onshore: Offshore
- Coordinates: 53°05’02”N 02°32’50”E
- Operators: ARCO, Perenco
- Partners: see text

Field history
- Discovery: December 1973
- Start of production: 1986
- Peak year: 1987
- Abandonment: 2014

Production
- Producing formations: Rotliegend sandstone

The Thames gas field is a depleted natural gas reservoir and former gas production facility in the UK sector of the southern North Sea. The field is located about 80 km north east of Bacton, Norfolk; the Thames production facility was in operation from 1986 until 2014.

== The fields ==
The Thames field was discovered by ARCO in December 1973 by well 49/28-4. The field is principally located in Block 48/28. The gas reservoir is a Rotliegend sandstone. At the time of start-up, the field was jointly owned by ARCO British Ltd (43.34%), British Sun Oil Co Ltd (23.33%), Superior Oil (UK) Ltd (20.00%), Deminex UK Oil & Gas Ltd (10.00%), and Canadian Superior Oil (UK) Ltd (3.33%). The field was anticipated to have recoverable reserves of 16.2 billion cubic metres (bcm).

In addition to Thames, the adjacent fields produced natural gas to the Thames facility.

Thames area fields
Field	Block	Date discovered	Reserves, bcm (note 1)	Original owner	Owner in 2014
Thames	49/28	December 1973	16.2	ARCO & others	Perenco
Bure	49/28	May 1983	16.2	ARCO & others	Perenco
Wensum	49/28	September 1985	16.2	ARCO & others	Perenco
Yare	49/28	May 1969	16.2	ARCO & others	Perenco
Orwell	50/26a	February 1990	6.9	ARCO/ Texaco	Tullow
Deben	49/28		1.0	Tullow	Tullow
Welland NW	53/4a	January 1984	8.1	ARCO/Britoil/Elf	Perenco
Welland S	53/4a	June 1984	8.1	ARCO/Britoil/Elf	Perenco
Arthur	53/2	2003	3.7	ExxonMobil	Perenco
Gawain	49/29a	1970	5.55	ARCO	Perenco
Horne	53/3	1992		Hamilton Oil	Tullow
Wren	53/3	1997		ARCO	Tullow
Wissey	53/04	1967		Signal Oil	Tullow

note 1. Reserves are in billion cubic metres (bcm).

The Thames, Bure, Deben, Welland, Wensum and Yare fields are named after rivers in East Anglia and south east England.

Arthur and Gawain are part of the Arthurian gas fields.

== Development ==
The Thames field was developed by ARCO as a central 3-platform bridge linked complex. In addition to its own gas, Thames was designed to be a central hub to receive and process well fluids from the surrounding installations. Processed gas was transmitted by pipeline from Thames to the Bacton Gas Terminal, Norfolk. The main design parameters of the Thames area installations are summarized in the table.

Thames area installations
Installation name	Block	Coordinates	Water depth, metres	Type	Legs	Piles	Well slots	Production to	Pipeline, length and diameter	Pipeline number
Thames AP	49/28	53°05’02” 02°32’50”	31	Steel jacket	6	6	Nil	Thames AW	bridge	–
Thames AW	49/28	53°05’04” 02°32’50”	31	Steel jacket	4	4	5	Bacton	89.5 km, 24”	PL370
Thames AR	49/28	53°05’02” 02°32’53”	31	Vierendeel tower	4	4	nil	Thames AP	bridge	–
Horne/Wren	53/3	52°54’06” 02°35’57”	41	Steel jacket			2	Thames AR	20.3 km 10”	PL2080
Bure O	49/28-8	53°07’25” 02°25’32”	35	Subsea wellhead	–	–	1	Thames AW	9.3 km, 8”	PL371
Bure West	49/28-18	53.129177 02.403614	35	Subsea wellhead	–	–	1	Thames AR	11.2 km, 8”	PL1635
Orwell	49/26a2	53°08’28” 03°02’34”	33	Subsea wellhead	–	–	3	Thames AW	34 km, 16”	PL931
Yare C	49/28	53.044933 2.574231	37	Subsea wellhead	–	–		Thames AW	4.8 km, 8”	PL372
Welland	49/29b	53.985194 02.736594	39	Steel jacket	3		1	Thames AW	17.5 km,16”	PL674
Welland NW	49/29b	53.089044 2.675147	34	Subsea wellheads	–	–	3	Welland	8 km, 5.8 km, 3.2 km, 8”	PL676 PL677 PL678
Arthur	53/2	52°54’48” 02°14’57”	42	Subsea wellhead	–	–	3	Thames AW	29.3 km, 12”	PL2047
Gawain	49/29a	53°09’35” 02°44’06”	37	Subsea wellhead	–	–	1	Thames AW	15.4 km, 12”	PL1057
Deben / Thurne	49/28	53°06’03” 02°28’44”	34	Subsea wellhead	–	–		Thames AR	5.2 km, 8”	PL1637
Wissey	53/4d	52°54’05” 02°45’11”	39	Subsea wellhead	–	–		Horne/Wren	30.9 km	PL2492

In 2007 the Deben wellhead was reused for the Thurne development.

The Thames AP platform had the main process equipment which included gas compressors and liquid handling plant. The accommodation facilities for 47 crew were also located on AP. The AW platform had 5 wellheads and the reception facilities for Arthur, Orwell, Gawain, Bure, Welland and Yare fields. The AR platform had reception facilities for Bure West, Horne/Wren and Thurne fields.

In addition to the gas pipelines, there were also umbilicals between some of the installations.

Umbilicals
Name	From – to	Diameter, inches	Length, km	Pipeline number
Yare C umbilical	Thames AW to Yare C well	4	4.8	PL373
Bure O umbilical	Thames AW	4	9.3	PL374
Bure West umbilical	Thurne to Bure West	5	11.2	PL1636
Thurne flowline	Thames AR to Thurne	8	4.6	PL1637
Thurne umbilical	Thames AR to Thurne	5	4.5	PL1638

As part of the Thames development new pipeline reception facilities and process plant was installed at the Phillips (latter Eni, Tullow) terminal at Bacton gas terminal. From the reception facilities gas passed to the former Amoco (later Perenco) site for treatment.

== Gas production ==
Gas production from Thames and the connected fields is shown in the table, data includes the peak rate and the cumulative production over the period 1986 to 2014.

Gas Production
Name	Production start	Peak flow, mcm/y	Peak year	Production end	Cumulative production to 2014
Thames	1986	1,600	1987	2014	6,867
Wensum	1986	1,600	1987	1997	61
Yare	1986	1,600	1987	2014	1,945
Bure O	1986	291	1988	2014	2,003
Bure West	1986			2014	822
Horne	2005	325	2006	2011	1,238
Wren	2005	396	2007	2012	1,045
Orwell	1993	1,470	1995	2008	8,618
Welland NW	1990	931	1991	2002	5,378
Welland South	1991	389	1992	2002	2,283
Arthur	2005	858	2005	2014	2,378
Gawain	1995	929	1996	2014	6,311
Deben	1998	240	1999	2004	457
Thurne	2007	129	2007	2012	209
Wissey	2008	257	2009	2013	574

Production profile, in mcm/y, of the Thames field
Production profile, in mcm/y, of the Orwell field

== Decommissioning and recommissioning ==
A cessation of production authorisation for Thames was granted in May 2014. Perenco developed a decommissioning programme. This entailed the plugging and abandonment of all wells and removal of all structures above the seabed. Pipelines were left in situ after being flushed and filled with seawater.

In 2019 Independent Oil and Gas (now IOG) purchased the Thames gas pipeline reception facilities at the Bacton terminal. The facilities comprise an area of land within the Perenco part of Bacton where IOG's fully owned Thames pipeline connects to the terminal. It includes gas and liquids reception equipment recommissioned for the development of IOG's southern North Sea Core Project, across six fields. Produced gas will continue onto the main Perenco Bacton plant for final processing. In 2021 the Blythe and Southwark platforms were installed.

== See also ==
- Bacton gas terminal
- Arthurian gas fields
- Leman gas field
- Indefatigable gas field
- List of oil and gas fields of the North Sea
