= Arthurian gas fields =

UK gas field in the North Sea

- Country: United Kingdom
- Region: Southern North Sea
- Location/blocks: Quadrant 48, 49, 53
- Offshore/onshore: Offshore
- Owner: Mobil (initially)

Field history
- Discovery: 1967 - 2003
- Start of production: 1989

Production
- Producing formations: Rotliegendes sandstone

The Arthurian gas fields are small natural gas producing areas in the UK sector of the southern North Sea, their names are associated with the legend of King Arthur. The fields started gas production from 1989 and several are now depleted and have been decommissioned.

== The fields ==
Mobil instigated the field naming convention using characters, people, places and objects associated with the legendary British King Arthur. Mobil applied it to its gas fields across the southern North Sea. The Arthurian fields span Quadrants 48, 49 and 53 from Arthur in the south east to Excalibur in the north west.

The Arthurian fields and the reservoir parameters are as follows.

Arthurian fields reservoir parameters
Field	Block	Coordinates	Gas reservoir	Gas reserves (see note below)	Discovered	Original licensee(s)
Arthur	53/2b 53/1d	53.032447 2.390328		3.7 bcm	2003	ExxonMobil
Avalon	49/09b			104 bcf	December 1989	Mobil
Camelot North	53/1a		Lower Permian Leman sand Rotliegendes	2.30 bcm	November 1967	Mobil North Sea Ltd
Camelot Central South	53/1a		Lower Permian Leman sand Rotliegendes	7.20 bcm	June 1987	Mobil North Sea Ltd
Camelot North East	53/2	52.972000 2.21444	Permian	0.90 bcm	March 1988	Mobil North Sea Ltd
Excalibur	48/17a 48/18a	53.465083 1.344583	Rotliegendes	7.1 bcm	1988	Mobil North Sea Ltd
Galahad	48/12	53.546722 1.360611		153 bcf		Mobil
Gawain	49/29a	53.171136 2.701406	Leman sands	196 bcf	1970	ARCO
Guinevere	48/17b	53.414833 1.273639	Permian	2.07 bcm	1988	Mobil North Sea Ltd (25.5%)
Lancelot	48/17a 48/18a	53.41002 1.375306	Permian	5.60 bcm	1986	Mobil North Sea Ltd
Malory	48/12d	5.543611 1.244167	Rotliegendes	35 bcf	1997	Mobil
Mordred	48/12b					Superior
Tristan	49/29b		Permian	0.80 bcm	May 1976	Mobil (60%)
Tristan NW	49/29					Granby

Note: bcm = billion cubic metres, bcf = billion cubic feet

== Developments ==
The fields were developed with an array of platforms and subsea completions. Production from the fields was principally routed via existing infrastructure to the onshore Bacton gas terminal.

Arthurian fields offshore installations
Field	Water depth, metres	Field installations	Export to	Export pipeline, length and diameter (inches)	Production started	Decommissioned	Current or last operator
Arthur	42	3 Subsea wells	Thames 49/28A	18.2 miles, 12”	2005	2014	Esso
Avalon (developed as Windermere)	35	Fixed steel	Markham	6.8 km, 8"	April 1997	April 2016	Ineos
Camelot North	15	Fixed steel CA	Leman 27A	9 miles, 12”	October 1989	2011	ERT, Perenco
Camelot Central South	15	Fixed steel CA	Leman 27A	9 miles, 12”	October 1989	2011	Perenco
Camelot North East	43	Fixed steel CB	Camelot CA	1 mile, 6”	December 1992	2002 (reused)	
Excalibur	27	Fixed steel EA	Lancelot	5 miles, 12”	October 1989	2017	Perenco
Galahad	20	Fixed steel monotower	Lancelot	16 km	November 1995	Operational	Perenco, Chieftan, Premier Pict
Gawain	37	Subsea	Thames 49/28A	9.6 miles, 12”	October 1986	2014	Perenco
Guinevere	17	Fixed steel	Lancelot	4 miles, 8”	June 1993	Yes	Perenco
Lancelot	21	Fixed steel	Bacton	40 miles, 20” (LAPS)	June 1993	Operational	Perenco
Malory	21	Fixed Steel	Tee on Galahad -Lancelot pipeline	10”	October 1998	Operational	Perenco
Mordred	20	Subsea well	Galahad				
Tristan	37	Subsea drilled from Welland	Welland & Thames		Nov 1992	2014	Silverstone
Tristan NW		Subsea well	Davy	15.5 km, 6”	2008	2010	Granby, Silverstone

The pipeline from Lancelot to Bacton is known as the LAPS pipeline (Lancelot Area Pipeline System).

The Lancelot installation also provided an export route for gas from the Durango and Waveney fields.

Field	Waveney	Durango
Block	48/17c	48/21
Installation	Fixed steel platform	Subsea wellhead
Water depth, metres	23	
Operator	ARCO then Perenco	Bridge North Sea Ltd
Reservoir	Rotliegend	Rotliegend
Gas reserves, billion cubic feet	84	
Production start	1998	2008
Export to	Lancelot	Waveney
Pipeline, length and size	7.65 km, 10-inch	14.7 km, 6-inch
Pipeline number	PL1639	PL2555

== Production ==
The peak and cumulative production of gas from the Arthurian fields was as follows.

Arthurian fields peak and cumulative gas production
Field	Peak production, bcm per year	Peak year	Cumulative production to 2014, million cubic metres (mcm)
Arthur	0.858	2005	2,378
Camelot North	0.20	1990	921
Camelot Central South	0.60	1990	6,015
Camelot North East	0.10	1993	498
Excalibur	0.53	1994	6,449
Galahad	0.707	1997	4,579
Gawain	0.929	1996	6,311
Guinevere	0.27	1994	2,728
Lancelot	0.93	1993	8,640
Malory	0.668	1999	4,045
Tristan	0.20	1992	1,062
Tristan NW	0.026	2008	45
Windermere (formerly Avalon)	0.438	1998	2,112

Gas production profile from Camelot Central South (in mcm)
Gas production profile from Lancelot (in mcm) up to 2014
Gas production profile from Excalibur (in mcm) up to 2014
Gas production profile from Gawain (in mcm) up to 2014

== See also ==
- Lincolnshire Offshore Gas Gathering System
- Leman gas field
- Bacton gas terminal
- List of oil and gas fields of the North Sea
- Planets gas fields
- Indefatigable gas field
- West Sole gas field
- Thames gas field
