= Interconnector (North Sea) =

- Location of Interconnector

Location
- Country: United Kingdom. Belgium
- Start: Bacton Gas Terminal
- Passes through: North Sea
- To: Zeebrugge

General information
- Type: natural gas
- Partners: Fluxys, Snam
- Operator: Interconnector (UK) Limited
- Construction started: 1996
- Commissioned: 1998

Technical information
- Length: 235 km (146 mi)
- Maximum discharge: 25.5 billion cubic metres a year
- Diameter: 1,016 mm (40 in)

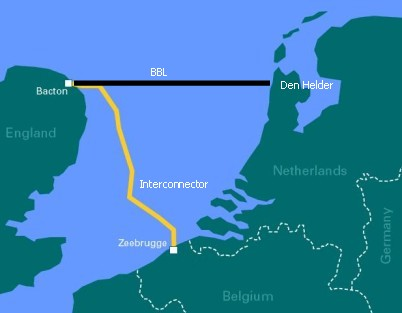
Map showing two gas pipelines between Zeebrugge (Belgium) and Den Helder (Netherlands) and Bacton (Bacton Gas Terminal) (UK)

Interconnector operates the physical, bi-directional gas pipeline between the UK and Belgium, providing 20 bcm/yr of UK export capacity and 25.5 bcm/year of UK import capacity. The operation is located over three sites - commercially in London, and physically from gas terminals at Bacton in the UK, and Zeebrugge in Belgium. Construction of the pipeline was completed in 1998.

The pipeline provides bi-directional transport capability to facilitate energy trading in both the UK and continental European gas markets. The Interconnector pipeline is an important part of the energy supply chain providing economic benefits and promoting security of supply. Interconnector have demonstrated reliability and historically met 99.8% of nominations over a 20 year period.

== Economic impact ==
The pipeline provides not only the physical capability to move gas from one end of the pipe to the other, it has been a key factor in the liberation of energy markets across Europe - enabling energy trading and creating economic activity in the process. Interconnector provides shippers with cost-effective gas transportation products that support gas supply and trading opportunities. Interconnector are continuously working alongside regulators and governments to ensure a fair and competitive environment, to benefit the commercial opportunities for customers.

== Shareholders ==
The company is part of the Fluxys Group and SNAM, who own an equity interest of 76.32% and 23.68% respectively.

== See also ==
- BBL Pipeline
- Zeebrugge Hub
- Nemo link, an electricity interconnector between Belgium and the United Kingdom
