= BBL Pipeline =

Natural gas pipeline between the UK and the Netherlands

Balgzand Bacton Line
- Location of Balgzand Bacton Line

Location
- Country: Netherlands, United Kingdom
- Coordinates: 52.8890°N 3.0954°E
- Direction: east–west
- Start: Balgzand Gas Plant, Anna Paulowna, Netherlands
- Passes through: North Sea
- To: Bacton Gas Terminal, United Kingdom

General information
- Type: natural gas
- Partners: Gasunie, Uniper, Fluxys
- Operator: BBL Company
- Commissioned: 2006

Technical information
- Length: 235 km (146 mi)
- Maximum discharge: 19 billion cubic metres per year
- Diameter: 36 in (914 mm)
- No. of compressor stations: 1
- Compressor stations: Anna Paulowna

The BBL Pipeline (Balgzand Bacton Line, BBL) is a natural gas interconnector between the Netherlands and the United Kingdom.

== History ==
Laying the pipeline between the compressor station at the Balgzand Gas Plant at Grasweg in Anna Paulowna (province of North Holland) and Bacton Gas Terminal started on 14 July 2006. The pipeline became operational on 1 December 2006.

== Technical description ==
The overall length of pipeline is 235 kilometres (146 mi) of which around 230 kilometres (140 mi) is offshore. The pipeline's diameter is 36 inches (910 mm) and working pressure is 135 standard atmospheres (13,700 kPa). The initial capacity is 16 billion cubic meters (bcm) per year, which will be increased to 19.2 bcm by the end of 2010 by installing a fourth compressor at the compressor station at Anna Paulowna. The pipeline has a regulatory exemption from the two-ways gas flow until October 2018. Until this, the direction of gas flow is from the Netherlands to the UK. The overall cost of the project was around €500 million.

== Operating company ==
The BBL was developed and operated by the BBL Company. The main shareholder of the company is Gasunie with 60% of the shares, and Enagas and Fluxys both own 20%. Russian Gazprom had an option for 9%, in exchange for a 9% share of Nord Stream AG. The BBL Pipeline would allow Gazprom to supply additional gas to the British market through the Nord Stream 1 pipeline.

== See also ==
- Interconnector (North Sea)
