= Hewett gas field =

Gas field in the North Sea, United Kingdom

- Country: United Kingdom
- Region: Southern North Sea
- Location/blocks: 48/28, 48/29, 48/30, 52/4, 52/5
- Offshore/onshore: Offshore
- Coordinates: 53°01′03″N 1°47′43″E
- Operator: Phillips Petroleum (1966-2000), Tullow Oil (2000-2008), Eni UK (2008- )

Field history
- Discovery: 1966
- Start of development: 1967
- Start of production: 1969
- Peak of production: 1976

Production
- Current production of gas: 819×10^{6} cu ft/d (23.2×10^{6} m^{3}/d)
- Recoverable gas: 3,500×10^{9} cu ft (99×10^{9} m^{3})
- Producing formations: Bunter sandstones

The Hewett gas field is a large natural gas and associated condensate field located under the North Sea 19 miles (30 km) off the Norfolk coast.

== The field ==
The Hewett gas field is a natural gas field located in the UK North Sea. The field is named after the Hewett Ledges a sand bank feature beneath which the field is situated. The gas reservoir is a Lower Triassic (Middle and Lower Bunter) sandstone and a Permian Zechstein carbonate bed at a relatively shallow depth of 3,000–4,200 feet (914–1,280 m). The Hewett structure runs north-west to south-east and is about 18 miles long and 3 miles wide (29 km by 4.8 km). It was discovered in October 1966 and extends over blocks: 48/28, 48/29, 48/30, 52/4 and 52/5. To the north are the Big Dottie, Little Dottie and Deborah accumulations, which are separate from Hewett, but are produced through the Hewett topsides facilities. The original determination of the gas in place amounted to 115 billion cubic metres. The field was originally licensed to Phillips Petroleum Exploration UK Ltd (then from 2001 Tullow Oil UK Ltd and from 2008 Eni UK Ltd). Production from the field began in July 1969. Gas and associated condensate are exported from the field via two 30 inch diameter pipelines to the Bacton gas terminal, Norfolk. Eni submitted plans in 2019 to decommission the Hewett field and to remove all installations. The end of production is scheduled for late 2021.

The Hewett gas compositions and properties are as follows.

Hewett gas properties
Composition	Middle Bunter %	Lower Bunter %
Methane	86.57	92.13
Ethane	4.87	3.56
Propane	1.40	0.85
Butane and Pentane	0.32	0.56
Nitrogen	6.57	2.36
Carbon dioxide	0.09	0.02
Hydrogen sulfide	500 ppm	Nil
Gas gravity	0.655%	0.607%
Mean condensate content	3.2 bbl/million cu ft	4.8 bbl/million cu ft
Btu rating	1011 Btu/cu ft	1047 Btu/cu ft

== Development ==
The Hewett field has been developed through a number of offshore installations.

Hewett gas field installations
Installation	Location Block	Facility	Function	Type	Legs	Well slots	Installed	Production start	Production to
Hewett 52/5 A	52/5	Platform	Drilling & production	Steel jacket	8	8	September 1967	September 1969	FTP
Hewett 48/29 A	48/29	Platform, bridge linked to FTP	Drilling & production	Steel jacket	12	8	May 1968	July 1969	FTP
Hewett 48/29 B	48/29	Platform	Drilling & production	Steel jacket	8	8	August 1972	1973	FTP
Hewett 48/29 C	48/29	Platform	Drilling & production	Steel jacket	8	8	1976	1976	FTP
Hewett FTP	48/29	Platform, bridge linked to 48/29 A	Field terminal platform	Steel jacket	8	–	1968	July 1969	Bacton
Hewett 48/29 Q	48/29	Platform, bridge linked to 48/29 A	Accommodation	Steel jacket	4	–		–	–
Other fields producing via Hewett
Deborah	48/30	Subsea	Production	Subsea wellhead	–	1	1979	1979	48/29 C
Little Dotty	48/30	Subsea	Production	Subsea wellhead	–	1	1979	1979	48/29 A
Della	48/30	Subsea	Production	Subsea wellhead	–	1	1988	November 1988	48/29 A
Delilah	48/30	Subsea	Production	Subsea wellhead	–	1			48/29 A
Area B	48/30	Subsea	Production	Subsea wellhead	–	1			FTP
Dawn	48/29	Subsea	Production	Subsea wellhead	–	1			48/29 C
–	48/30 & 30/10	Subsea	Production	Subsea wellhead	–	2			48/29 C

== Production ==
Annual gas production from the Hewett field (in million standard cubic feet)

== Decommissioning ==
In 2020 Eni submitted to the UK Government a proposal for the decommissioning of the Hewett field and its installations. Production from Hewett ceased in 2021.

== See also ==
- Indefatigable gas field
- Leman gas field
- West Sole gas field
- Viking gas field
