= Bacton Gas Terminal =

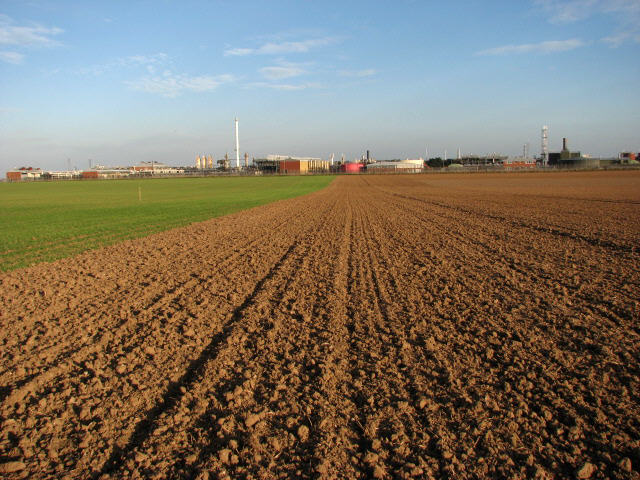
- Bacton Gas Terminal, from the west in 2007

- Location within Norfolk

General information
- Type: Gas terminal
- Location: Bacton, NR12 0JE
- Coordinates: 52.8608°N 1.4575°E
- Current tenants: Eni, National Grid, Shell UK, Perenco
- Construction started: 1967
- Completed: 1968
- Inaugurated: 13 August 1968
- Cost: £10 million (Shell 1968), £5 million (Phillips 1969)

Height
- Height: 410-470ft (two communication radio masts)

Technical details
- Floor area: 200 acres (0.81 km^{2})

The Bacton Gas Terminal is a complex of six gas terminals within four sites located on the North Sea coast of North Norfolk in the United Kingdom. The sites are near Paston and between Bacton and Mundesley; the nearest town is North Walsham. Bacton Gas Terminal is protected by the Civil Nuclear Constabulary.

The other main UK gas terminals which receive gas from the UK continental shelf are at St Fergus, Aberdeenshire; Easington, East Riding of Yorkshire; Theddlethorpe, Lincolnshire (now decommissioned); CATS Terminal, Teesside; and Rampside gas terminal, Barrow, Cumbria.

== History ==
The Bacton complex which covers an area of about 180 acres (73 ha) opened during 1968. It has a frontage of 1 km (3200 feet) along the cliff top. It was initially built by Shell-Esso, Phillips Petroleum-Arpet Group, Amoco-Gas Council. Planning permission had been given on 16 June 1967 by Anthony Greenwood, Baron Greenwood of Rossendale. The Leman field began production on 13 August 1968 (joint Shell-Esso and joint Amoco-Gas Council), the Hewett field (Phillips Petroleum-Arpet Group) began operations in July 1969 and the Indefatigable field (joint Shell-Esso and joint Amoco-Gas Council) began production in October 1971. Construction of the £5 million Phillips-Arpet plant began in April 1968. Gas from the Shell-Esso part of the Leman field was delivered to Bacton via a 34-mile-long pipeline. A 36-inch diameter 140-mile-long pipeline (Number 2 feeder main) costing £17 million was built by Italsider from Bacton to the National Transmission System near Rugby. When initially completed in 1968 the terminal had a total gas throughput capacity of 3,955 million cubic feet (112 million cubic metres) per day at standard conditions. The Gas Council marketed the new North Sea gas as High Speed Gas.

A. Monk Ltd of Padgate built the 1968 Shell plant.

== Operation ==
The Bacton complex consists of six gas terminals. The terminals are:

- Shell
- Eni
- Perenco
- National Grid - feeding the National Transmission System (NTS)
- Interconnector UK (within the National Grid site)
- BBL (Bacton-Balgzand line) (within the Shell site)

Three of the terminals (Eni, Perenco and Shell) receive gas from Southern North Sea (SNS) and some Central North Sea (CNS) offshore gas fields. Initial gas processing, such as removal of free water, takes place on the offshore gas installations. At the terminals gas and condensate are received in slugcatchers (to separate gas and hydrocarbon liquids and condensed water), the gas is compressed if necessary, dehydrated using triethylene glycol, and chilled to achieve a specified hydrocarbon dewpoint. Sour gas (sulphurous) had previously been removed at the Eni site by amine gas treating, now decommissioned. Hydrocarbon condensate is stabilized and piped by the British Pipeline Agency along the route of the former North Walsham to Mundesley railway line to the North Walsham rail terminal and thence by rail to an oil refinery at Harwich Essex. Treated gas from the three terminals flows to the National Grid terminal located immediately to the south of the reception terminals. Two of the terminals (Interconnector and BBL) receive gas from, or deliver gas to, the gas networks of continental Europe. Manifolds within the National Grid terminal blend the gas and distribute it to the National Transmission System at around 1000 psig (69 bar).

The offshore reception terminals were originally run by Royal Dutch Shell-Esso, Phillips Petroleum-Arpet Group and Amoco-Gas Council. Amoco and BP announced they had merged in 1998 to form BP Amoco, the merged organisation changed its name to BP in 2001. Perenco took over the BP operations in September 2003. Tullow had begun operations in 2003 taking over the Phillips Petroleum terminal operations, ENI took over the Tullow Oil operations in December 2008.

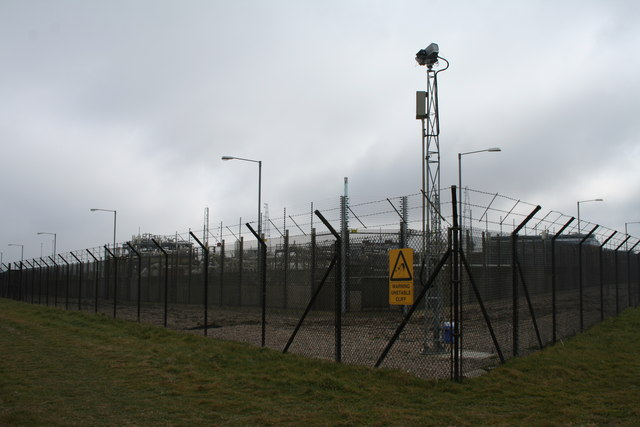
CCTV and protective perimeter fence

=== Shell terminal ===
The Shell terminal, the most easterly of the three, receives gas and condensate from two offshore pipelines. These are a 55.7 km long 30-inch pipeline from the Leman 49/26AP offshore installation and a 73 km 24-inch pipeline from the Clipper PT installation. A mothballed 30-inch pipeline formerly delivered gas from the Leman 49/26BT installation to Bacton. The terminal also receives gas from the 474 kilometres (295 mi) long 34-inch SEAL Pipeline, which transports gas from the Shearwater and Elgin-Franklin gas fields in the Central North Sea. The SEAL Pipeline is the longest on the UK Continental Shelf. The Shell plant has a gas treatment capacity of 900 million ft^{3} (25 million m^{3}) per day at standard conditions and a condensate stabilization capacity of 8,000 barrels per day (1,270 m^{3}/day). The gas hydrocarbon dewpoint is achieved by propane refrigeration. Truck loading facilities for condensate were originally provided. It employs 46 people and began operations in 1968. The BBL Pipeline terminal became operational in December 2006 and is located within the Shell terminal. The BBL terminal is operated, but not owned, by Shell.

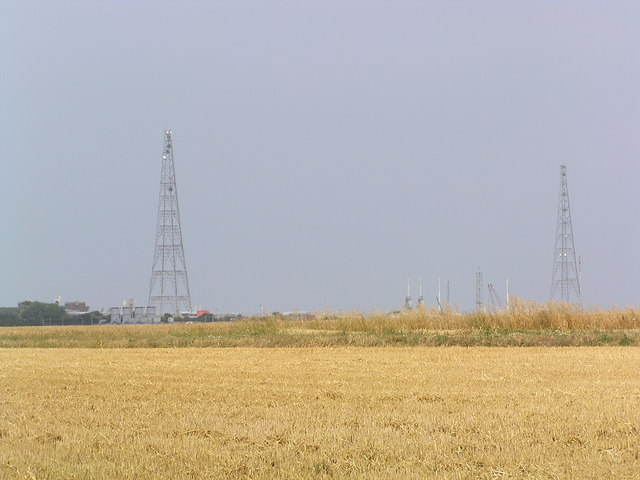
Bacton Gas Terminal

=== Eni terminal ===
The most westerly of the terminals is owned by Eni of Italy. It receives gas from two 30-inch pipelines from the Hewett field (27.7 km and 32.8 km long) and a 62 km long 20-inch pipeline from Lancelot 48/17A offshore installation (LAPS complex). A decommissioned 24-inch pipeline formerly delivered gas from the Thames 49/28A offshore installation. Gas and liquid from each pipeline are received and processed separately. After gas and condensate are separated in vessel-type slugcatchers and filter-separators each gas stream is fiscally metered (for tax purposes). The two Hewett field gas streams are combined and increased in pressure through an eductor. The gas stream was formerly treated with amine to remove sulphur compounds, this facility was decommissioned in 2000 when production from the sour Hewett Upper Bunter reservoir was shut-in. The gas is comingled with the LAPS gas then compressed. It was formerly dehydrated using triethylene glycol and underwent hydrocarbon dew point reduction by chilling with propane. Finally it was fiscally metered (for sales) and transferred to the Bacton NTS plant. Formerly the terminal had pentane storage tanks and a truck loading facility. The terminal has two GE 11MW Frame 3 and one GE 3.7MW Frame 1 gas turbines, connected to three centrifugal compressors. In 2011 the Eni Terminal was split by segregating the reception and some of the compression facilities from the dehydration and dewpoint control plant, the latter was decommissioned. Now after compression the gas is sent to the Perenco site for dehydration and dewpoint control. The separated condensate is also sent to the Perenco site. During late 2013/2014 the redundant processing facilities were removed and now the majority of the Eni site is unused.

=== Perenco terminal ===
This terminal, located between the Shell terminal and the Eni terminal, processes gas from pipelines from the Leman, Indefatigable and Trent & Tyne fields. These include two 30 inches (760 mm) pipelines from the Leman 49/27AP and Leman 49/27B offshore installations (61.82 km and 64.9 km respectively) and a 24 inches (610 mm) pipeline from the Trent 43/24 offshore installation. The processing plant comprises two parallel trains (A1 plant and A2 plant) each with an initial processing capacity of 1,000 million ft^{3} (28 million m^{3}) per day at standard conditions and a condensate stabilization capacity of 600 m^{3}/day, stabilized condensate is stored in gasoline storage tanks prior being piped to the North Walsham rail terminal. Gas from the 'Leman' pipe-type slugcatcher is normally routed to dewpoint control plant streams 1, 2 and 3; gas from the 'Inde' pipe-type slugcatcher is routed to dewpoint control plant streams 4 & 5. Gas from the Tyne and Trent pipe-type slugcatcher can be routed to either dew point control plant. There is also a cross-connection to and from the Shell terminal.

The ENI terminal was integrated into the Perenco Terminal in 2011, thereby diverting the Hewett, LAPS and at one time Thames gas and condensate from the slug catchers and compression in the Eni terminal to the Perenco terminal upstream of the dehydration and dew point control plant.

=== National Gas terminal ===
Connections from the offshore reception terminals comprise two 30-inch lines from the Eni terminal (now disused), two 30-inch lines from the Perenco terminal, four 24-inch lines from the Shell terminal and a 36-inch line from the BBL pipeline. Gas from the Perenco and Shell terminals is filtered, measured through orifice plates and the flow regulated by volume into a manifold system. Facilities for heating the gas by pressurised hot water are provided should this be necessary if the pressure of the incoming gas has to be reduced appreciably. There are four 36-inch manifolds within the National Gas terminal, plus one spare, which can receive flow from any of the incoming lines, thus blending the gas. A 24-inch by-pass ringmain around the site perimeter enables the terminal to be completely by-passed in an emergency. The blended gases are odorised (1 kg odorant for 60,000 m^{3} of gas) and the flow rate is measured and distributed then to the National Transmission System via five outgoing feeders:

- Feeder No 2 to Brisley, Peterborough and Rugby, 36-inch
- Feeder No 3 to Roudham Heath, Cambridge and Hitchin, 36-inch
- Feeder No 4 to Great Ryburgh, King's Lynn and Alrewas, 36-inch
- Feeder No 5 to Yelverton, Diss, Chelmsford and Horndon-on-the-Hill, 36-inch
- Feeder No 27 to King's Lynn, 36-inch

From the National Gas terminal gas can also be sent to, or received from, Zeebrugge, Belgium via the Interconnector, received from the Netherlands via the 36-inch Balgzand Bacton Line BBL Pipeline. Gas is also distributed to the local area via a low pressure gas distribution system and sent via a 12-inch high pressure pipeline to Great Yarmouth power station

=== Interconnector UK terminal ===
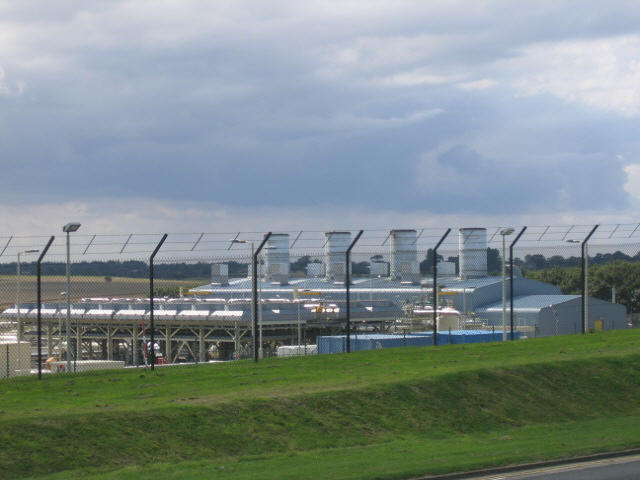
Compressor station

The Interconnector terminal is located within the National Grid terminal. It can import gas from, or export gas to, Zeebrugge, Belgium via a 235 km pipeline operating at up to 147 bar. There is a 30-inch direct access line from the SEAL pipeline. It works via four GE LM2500 gas turbines and a Thermodyn centrifugal compressor in its compressor station, which was built by Kværner John Brown (now called McDermott). The Interconnector was commissioned in 1998.

=== BBL terminal ===
The BBL (Bacton–Balgzand line) terminal is located within the Shell terminal, it receives gas from the compressor station in Anna Paulowna in the Netherlands. The Bacton reception plant is owned by BBL Company and the plant is operated by Shell. Gas arrives at Bacton at approximately seabed temperature and a pressure of up to 135 bar but which varies depending on the amount of line pack. Bacton's role is to reduce the pressure for entry to the National Transmission System. As such, significant Joule–Thomson cooling may occur prior to gas injection into the NTS. Therefore, four identical parallel streams are installed at Bacton, each equipped with a direct-fired water bath heater on a slipstream and designed to operate as three duty and one standby at maximum flow conditions, in order to control the delivery temperature and pressure of the gas. The BBL Pipeline is 235 km long and was commissioned in December 2006.

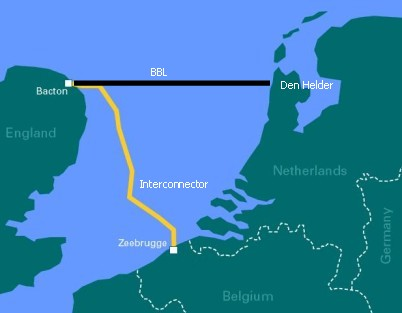
Interconnector to Zeebrugge in Belgium

== Shell gas fields ==
=== Leman ===
The Leman field is 30 miles (48 km) north-east of Great Yarmouth and is named after the Leman Sandbank upon which it is situated. It consists of an 800 ft (240 m) thick Rotliegendes sandstone reservoir at a depth of about 6,000 ft (1,800 m), and is about 18 miles (29 km) long by 5 miles (8.0 km) wide. It was discovered in August 1966 and is licensed to Shell (Block 49/26) and Perenco (Block 49/27). The Leman 49/26A (AD1, AD2, AP & AK) installation began production in August 1968, with initial recoverable reserves of 292 billion m^{3}. 49/26B (BT & BH) and 49/26B (BP & BD) began production in November 1970, Leman 49/26C (CD & CP) in February 1972, 49/26D in August 1974, 49/26E in August 1983, and both 49/26F and 49/26G in September 1987. The Leman complex of platforms is directly east of the Hewett complex. and connects to Bacton via Leman 49/26A, which has two RB211 (driving HP compression) and two Avon (driving LP compression) gas turbines. A decommissioned 36-inch pipeline formerly delivered gas from Leman 49/26BT to Bacton.

In the mid-1990s, the glycol dehydration facilities of several installations in the Inde and Leman fields were decommissioned. This enabled the installations to become normally unattended installations (NUIs), reducing manning costs and risks to personnel.

=== Indefatigable and Indefatigable SW ===
The Indefatigable gas field is 60 miles (97 km) north-east of Great Yarmouth and named after the World War I Royal Navy battlecruiser HMS Indefatigable. It is a Rotliegendes sandstone reservoir 200–300 ft (61–91 m) thick at a depth of 8,000–9,000 ft (2,400–2,700 m). It is licensed to Shell (Blocks 49/24 and 49/19) and Perenco (Blocks 49/23 and 49/18). The field was discovered in June 1966, and production started in September 1971. It had initial recoverable reserves of 125 billion m^{3}. The Inde 49/24J (JD & JP) installation started in September 1971, Inde 49/24K in March 1973, Inde 49/24L in October 1978 and the Inde 49/24M platform in October 1985. Gas production was via the Amoco (now Perenco) Inde 49/23A installation, then via a joint line to the Leman 49/27B installation and thence to Bacton. The Inde 49/24 field ceased production on 5 July 2005. Juliet, Kilo, Lima, Mike and November were removed by July 2011. Indefatigable SW was discovered in June 1967 and production started in October 1989.

=== Corvette ===
Corvette (Block 49/24A) connects via a 20-inch pipeline to the Leman 49/26A complex and named after the corvette ship. It is run by Shell and owned equally by Shell and Esso. Discovered in January 1996, production started in January 1999.

=== Brigantine ===
Brigantine (Block 49/19), named after the brigantine ship, is owned by Shell and Esso and run by Shell. Brigantine A began was discovered in 1986; B in 1997; and C in 1998. All three fields began production in October 2001 via the 49/19BR and 49/19BG platforms. Gas is piped to the Bacton terminal via the Corvette and Leman A complex. Caravel 49/20 production is via the Brigantine to Corvette pipeline, while Shamrock production is via Caravel 49/20.

=== Sean ===
Sean (Blocks 49/24, 49/25 and 49/30) consists of the Sean P (PD and PP) and the (smaller) Sean RD platforms. The Sean North field was discovered in May 1969, and Sean South was in January 1970; production started in October 1986. It is owned equally by Shell, Esso Exploration & Production UK Ltd, Union Texas and Britoil (BP) but run by Shell. Sean East was discovered in June 1983, with production starting in November 1994.

=== Clipper ===
Clipper (48/19) is part of the Sole Pit field. It was discovered in March 1968. Production started in October 1990. It is owned by Shell and Esso and run by Shell. The Clipper complex has been developed as a nodal platform Clipper P (PW, PT, PM, PC, PR, PH) for the Galleon, Barque, Skiff and Carrack Fields. It is named after the clipper type of ship

=== Barque ===
Barque PB and Barque PL (48/13 and 48/14) are part of the Sole Pit complex. They were discovered in 1971, and production started in October 1990. Barque is owned by Shell and Esso and run by Shell. It is furthest north of the fields connected to Bacton, being further north of many of the Lincolnshire-connected gas fields. Piped to Bacton via the Clipper complex, it is named after the barque design of ship.

=== Galleon ===
Galleon PG and Galleon PN (48/20) are part of the Sole Pit complex. Production started in October 1994, after the initial discovery in September 1969. It is owned by Shell and Esso and run by Shell. Piped to Bacton via Clipper complex, it is named after the galleon type of ship.

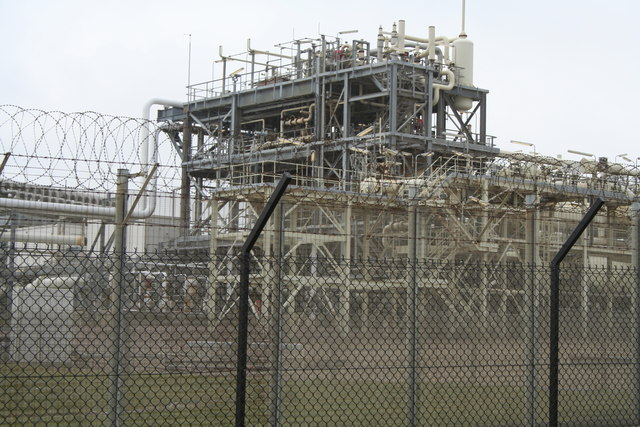
Closeup

=== Carrack and Cutter ===
Carrack QA and Carrack West (49/9, 49/14 and 49/15) are located approximately 120 km (75 mi) north east of Bacton. Production started in 2003. It is owned by Shell and Esso and run by Shell. Cutter QC exports gas via Carrack QA, and then pipes it to Bacton via the Clipper complex.

=== Shearwater ===
Run by Shell but owned 28% by Shell UK Ltd, 28% by Esso Exploration & Production UK Ltd, 28% by ARCO British Ltd, 12% by Superior Oil (UK) Ltd, and 4% by Canadian Superior Oil UK Ltd. Discovered in September 1988 with production starting in September 2000, it connects to Bacton via the Shearwater Elgin Area Line. The 474 km (295 mi) SEAL pipeline also connects to the Elgin-Franklin gas field.

== Tullow and Eni fields ==
=== Hewett ===
The Hewett field (Blocks 48/29, 48/30, 52/4 and 52/5) has several reservoirs at relatively shallow depths: 3,000-4,200 ft (910–1280 m). The structure is a north-west to south-east anticline about 18 miles (29 km) long by three miles (4.8 km) wide. It is operated by Eni UK and comprises the complexes: Dawn, Big Dotty, and Deborah, and Delilah, Della and Little Dotty. It is owned 89.31% by Eni UK with Perenco owning the remaining 10.69%. It was discovered in October 1966 and production started in July 1969. It had initial recoverable reserves of 97 billion m^{3}. The Hewett field produced gas from four subsea reservoirs: Permian Rotliegendes sandstone, Permian Zechstein magnesian limestone, and Lower Triassic Lower Bunter shale and Upper Bunter sandstone. The Upper Bunter formation comprised sour (high sulphur) gas. This required the provision of sour gas treatment facilities at Bacton, before production from the Upper Bunter was suspended in 2000. Hewett has two 30-inch pipelines to Bacton (27.7 km and 32.8 km). It is the set of fields nearest to Bacton being 25 miles (40 km) east of Great Yarmouth. It was run by Phillips Petroleum, which became ConocoPhillips, and then largely owned and run by Tullow Oil before being purchased by Eni UK.

=== Fizzy ===
Situated east of the Thames complex and is not yet a producing field.

== Perenco gas fields ==
=== Leman ===
Block 49/27 of the Leman field is licensed to, and operated by, Perenco UK Ltd, originally by the Gas Council-Amoco. It was discovered in August 1966 and production started in August 1968. It had initial recoverable reserves of 292 billion m^{3}. It comprises the following installations, platforms and complexes: Leman 49/27A (AD, AP, AC, AQ, AX); 49/27B (BD, BP, BT); 49/27C (CD, CP); 49/27D (DD, DP); 49/27E (ED, EP); 49/27F (FD, FP); 49/27G; 49/27H; and 49/27J. Gas is routed to Bacton via two 30-inch pipelines from Leman 49/27A and Leman 49/27B.

=== Indefatigable ===
Blocks 49/23 and 49/18 of the Indefatigable field are licensed to, and operated by, Perenco, originally by the Gas Council-Amoco. The field was discovered in June 1966 and production started in September 1971. It had initial recoverable reserves of 125 billion m^{3}. It comprises the following installations, platforms and complex: Indefatigable 49/23A (AT, AC, AQ); 49/23C (CD, CP); 49/23D (including the Baird field); 49/23E (Bessemer) and the subsea installation N.W.Bell (49/23-9); Inde 49/18A; and 49/18B. The decommissioned Shell Indefatigable field 49/24 formerly produced gas via the Inde 49/23A complex. Gas from Indefatigable 49/24AT is routed to Bacton via the Leman 49/27B complex.

=== Lancelot ===
The Lancelot complex (48/17A) is connected to the Eni Bacton terminal via the LAPS pipeline (Lancelot Area Pipeline System). It is run by the Anglo-French Perenco UK Ltd.

=== Galahad & Mordred ===
Galahad & Mordred (48/12BA) are operated by Perenco UK Limited. It is owned 72.23% by Perenco Gas UK Ltd, 15% by Chieftain Exploration UK Ltd, 10% by Premier Pict Petroleum Ltd, and 3% by Chieftain International North Sea Ltd. Discovered in December 1975 and production started in November 1995.

=== Guinevere ===
Guinevere (48/17B) is operated by Perenco UK Limited. It is owned 49.5% by Perenco Gas UK Ltd, 25.5% Perenco UK Limited and 25% Nobel Energy Inc. Discovered in May 1988 and production started in June 1993. Connects to the Eni plant at Bacton via the Lancelot 48/17A platform. Situated west of the (central) Lancelot field.

=== Excalibur ===
Excaliber EA (48/17A) is owned and operated by Perenco, production is via Lancelot 48/17A. The northernmost Arthurian gas field in the Lancelot complex.

=== Davy, Bessemer, Beaufort and Brown ===
Davy (49/30A) and Bessemer (49/23E) were developed by Amoco in 1995. Both are monopod installations. Both produce gas to Inde 49/23A.

=== Davy East ===
Production started in 2008. Connects to Perenco Gas Terminal at Bacton via the Indefatigable field.

== ENGIE E&P gas fields ==
=== Cygnus ===
The Cygnus gas field (44/11 and 44/12) was discovered in 1988. gas is produced via the Cygnus Alpha and Cygnus Bravo platforms. Gas first flowed to the UK on 13 December 2016. In 2017 it became the UK's largest gas field, providing 5% of the UK's natural gas, enough for 1.5 million homes. The platforms were built in Hartlepool and Fife, each weighing 4,400 tonnes. The gas is transported to the Perenco terminal via the 550-km pipeline on the Eagles Transmission System (ETS). The field is in the Permian Leman Sandstone Formation and Carboniferous Ketch Formation. The field is operated by Engie E&P UK Limited (former GDF Suez), which is 48% owned by Centrica.

== Iona gas fields ==
=== Trent ===
Trent (Block 43/24) is owned by Iona UK Developments Co. It was previously owned and operated by ARCO (Atlantic Richfield Company), and then Perenco UK Ltd. It was discovered in March 1991 and production started in November 1996. It connects to the Perenco Bacton terminal via the Eagles pipeline. Has two Solar Mars gas turbines for the compressor.

=== Tyne South & Tyne North ===
Furthest north of the Bacton gas fields, Tyne (Block 44/18) is around the same latitude north as Teesside. Owned by Iona UK Developments Co. It was run by ARCO, and then Perenco. Discovered in January 1992 and November 1996. Connects to Bacton via the Interfield pipeline and Eagles pipeline.

== Decommissioned gas fields ==
=== Esmond, Forbes and Gordon ===
The Esmond (43/8a), Forbes (43/13a) and Gordon (43/20a) fields reservoir is in the Lower Triassic Bunter Sandstone and was discovered by well 43/13-1 in 1969 by Hamilton Brothers Oil and Gas. First gas was produced in July 1985 from four installations operated by BHP Petroleum Ltd. Peak production rate was 200 million ft^{3} (5.7 million m^{3}) per day at standard conditions. Gas was exported by a 24 inches (610 mm) pipeline to the Amoco (now Perenco) terminal at Bacton. These fields and their platforms were decommissioned in 1995. In 1995 the export pipeline system (Esmond Transmission System, ETS) was renamed EAGLES (East Anglia Gas and Liquid Evacuation System) and operatorship was taken over by ARCO (then BP, later Perenco, now Iona) for production from the Trent and Tyne fields.

=== Welland NW & Welland S ===
Welland (53/4) was operated initially by Arco, ExxonMobil and lastly Perenco and owned 34% by Tullow Exploration Ltd, 55% by Esso, and 11% by Consort EU Ltd. Welland NW was discovered in January 1984 and Welland S in June 1984. Production started in September 1990. Situated south-east of the Thames complex to which it was connected to Bacton. Named after the River Welland. The Welland proved uneconomical by 2005 and was decommissioned and removed in 2010.

=== Camelot N and Camelot C & S ===
Camelot (53/1 and 53/2) was run by Petrofac, and owned by ERT. Camelot N discovered in November 1967 and Camelot C & S discovered in June 1987. Production started in October 1989. Connected to Bacton via the Leman 49/27A complex. Field decommissioned in 2011, Camelot platforms CA and CB removed in 2012.

=== Thames, Yare, Bure, Thurne, Wensum and Deben ===
These were operated by Perenco, controlled from the Thames complex, formerly operated by Arco British Limited and then ExxonMobil. The field comprised the Thames 49/28A installation and the subsea installations all producing via Thames: Yare C (49/28), Gawain (49/29A), Bure O (49/28-8), Bure West (49/28-18) and Thurne (49/28) owned by Tullow/Eni. The Thames installation comprised three platforms, a wellhead AW, a reception AR and process AP platform. Cessation of all remaining production feeding to the Thames complex was declared in 2014 and decommissioning commenced.

Owned 43% by Tullow Exploration Ltd, 23% by AGIP (UK) Ltd, 23% by Superior Oil (UK) Ltd, and 10% by Centrica Resources Ltd. Production from all fields began in October 1986. Thames was discovered in December 1973; Yare in May 1969; Bure in May 1983; and Wensum in October 1985. They were run by Tullow Oil as the Thames complex. Connected to the Tullow/Eni Bacton terminal via the Thames pipeline. Bought from Agip (of Italy) by Tullow in 2003. The fields were named after the River Thames, the Yare, Bure, Wensum of Norfolk, and the Deben of Suffolk.

The Thames complex had one Solar Mars, and one Ruston Tornado and TB5 gas turbines for its compressor.

=== Arthur ===
Arthur (53/2) is situated between the Hewett (to the west) and Thames (to the east) complexes. Connected to Bacton via the Thames complex. Production started in January 2005. Formerly owned by Tullow and run by Esso. Named after King Arthur. Decommissioned as part of Thames field decommissioning.

=== Horne and Wren ===
Horne and Wren (53/3) was south of, and producing to, the Thames complex. Production started in June 2005. Bought by Tullow from BP in 2004, then 50% sold to Centrica. Operated before 2004 by Shell. Decommissioned as part of Thames field decommissioning.

=== Wissey ===
Wissey (53/4) was south-west of the Thames complex, directly south of the Welland gas field. Named after the River Wissey in Norfolk. Decommissioned as part of Thames field decommissioning.

=== Orwell ===
Orwell (49/26A) was owned by Tullow Oil Ltd. It was run by ARCO, and was later run by Perenco. It was discovered in February 1990 with production starting in August 1993. East of the Thames complex, to which it connected, and furthest east of the Bacton gas fields. Bought by Tullow from ChevronTexaco (ChevTex, since May 2005 known as Chevron) in 2004. Named after the River Orwell in Suffolk. Decommissioned as part of Thames field decommissioning.

=== Gawain ===
Gawain (49/29A) was operated by Perenco UK Limited. It was owned by Perenco Gas UK Ltd 50% and Tullow Oil Ltd 50%. Discovered in December 1988 with production starting in October 1995. It was connected to Bacton via the Thames complex. Situated north-east of the Thames field, completely separate (to the east) of the other Arthurian-named fields. Decommissioned as part of Thames field decommissioning.

=== Tristan ===
Tristan (49/29) was owned and operated by Perenco Gas UK Ltd. Discovered in May 1976 and production started in November 1992. It was connected to Bacton via the Welland and Thames platforms, the Welland platform having been removed in 2010, and situated east of the Thames complex. Named after Tristan of the Arthurian legend.

== Baird and Deborah gas storage ==
Until its closure to new injections in 2017, the Rough facility was the only depleted UK offshore gas field reservoir that was used for gas storage and retrieval. Several projects have been developed to use other depleted gas fields but none have proved to be economically viable. Two examples associated with Bacton are the Baird and the Deborah Gas Storage Projects.

=== Baird gas storage project ===
Perenco’s Baird field is located in Block 49/23, 86 km off the coast of Norfolk. It is located adjacent to Perenco's Indefatigable field through which it exports gas via Inde 49/23D.

The Baird gas storage project was to have been built by Centrica Storage and Perenco (UK) Ltd. Centrica acquired 70% interest in the project from Perenco in February 2009. The companies formed a 70/30% joint venture called Bacton Storage Company to operate the facility when completed.

The project involved the transport of gas from the National Transmission System (NTS) through the Perenco onshore terminal at Bacton and then by pipeline offshore to be injected and stored in the Baird reservoir. Gas injection would take place during the Summer and be reversed during the Winter drawing gas from the reservoir for processing at Bacton and delivery into the NTS.

The onshore facilities included three gas turbine driven compressors, a gas dehydration plant, reception heaters, a mono ethylene glycol (MEG) storage and regeneration plant, additional gas fiscal metering systems and a vent stack. These facilities would be built on Perenco's terminal at Bacton. Planning permission was given by North Norfolk District Council on 27 July 2010.

The offshore facilities were a single four-legged normally unattended installation (NUI). The installation would have 18 well slots with up to 14 development wells. The NUI would be connected to Bacton through a 100 km long 38-inch diameter bidirectional pipeline. A 4.5-inch MEG line was to run in parallel delivering MEG from Bacton to the NUI.

The field would have a storage capacity of 81 billion cubic feet (2.3 billion cubic metres) making it the second largest gas storage facility in the UK. The facility would have a 50-year design life.

The project was expected to be completed in 2013 but was put on hold in 2012 with no construction work taking place. On 23 September 2013 Centrica announced that they would not proceed with the Baird project in light of weak economics for gas storage projects and the announcement by the Government on 4 September 2013 ruling out intervention in the market to encourage additional gas storage capacity in the UK.

=== Deborah gas storage project ===
Eni’s Deborah field lies in Blocks 48/28, 48/29, 48/30 and 52/03 about 40 km from the Norfolk coast. It is adjacent to the Hewett field through which it has produced gas since 1970.

The project was developed by Eni Hewett Limited. As with the Baird project gas would have been injected into the offshore reservoir during Summer months and withdrawn during the Winter and treated onshore at Bacton for delivery into the NTS.

The onshore facilities would include new reception facilities for the pipelines, two compressor houses for four new compressor, water treatment works, glycol storage and two vent stacks. Planning permission for the onshore facilities was given by North Norfolk District Council on 24 November 2010.

The offshore facilities would be two NUI platforms about 2 km apart located above the Deborah reservoir. There would be a total of 33 injection/withdrawal wells plus two monitoring wells spread between the two platforms. Each platform would be connected to Bacton by one of two 41-km-long 32-inch diameter bidirectional pipelines. A 2 km long 32-inch pipeline would connect the two platforms. A 41 km glycol pipeline would be piggybacked to one of the gas lines. A 41-km power and fibre optic control monitoring and communication cable from Bacton to one of the platforms and 2-km cables between the platforms would be provided.

The Deborah field was to have a storage capacity of 4.6 billion cubic metres. The facility was to have a 40-year design life. A gas storage licence was granted by the Department of Energy and Climate Change (DECC) on 22 October 2010. Start up was planned for April 2015. The project was mothballed in Autumn 2013.

== Installation identification ==
An offshore installation on the UK Continental Shelf may comprise a single integrated platform or two or more bridge-linked platforms. Installations are identified by a large black-on-yellow sign on the installation. This may give the name of the original or current owner or operator, the field name, and a set of numbers and letters, e.g. Shell/Esso Leman 49/26A. The numbers identify the Quadrant and Block where the installation is located, e.g. 49/26 is in Quadrant 49 Block 26. The first letter is a sequential letter (A, B, C, D, etc.) identifying each installation within a field. The second and subsequent letters may designate a platform's function, e.g. the Leman 49/26A complex comprises four bridge-linked platforms 49/26AP (Production), 49/26AD1 (Drilling 1), 49/26AD2 (Drilling 2), and 49/26AK (Compression). Common designations are:

Letter(s)	Platform function
A	Accommodation
C	Compression
D	Drilling (see note)
FTP	Field Terminal Platform
H	Hotel accommodation
K	Compression
M	Manifold, Main
P	Production, Processing
Q	Living Quarters
R	Riser, Reception
T	Terminal
X	Miscellaneous, e.g. as Low pressure compression, Reception.

Note: Drilling refers to the original function of the platform to support well drilling operations. No Southern North Sea installation has permanent drilling facilities.

On some installations the letters simply provide a unique two letter identity, e.g.Tethys TN, Viscount VO.

== Accidents and incidents ==
On 13 August 1981, 11 gas workers lost their lives in the G-ASWI North Sea ditching, in a Wessex helicopter. At 6pm on 28 February 2008, there was an explosion and fire at the Shell UK terminal, for which Shell was fined £1 million.

== Coastal erosion ==
When the terminal was first built in the 1960s, it was 100 metres (330 ft) from the sea. By 2019 coastal erosion had reduced this to 10 metres (33 ft). In July 2019 a scheme commenced to place almost two million cubic metres of sand along a 6-kilometre (3.7 mi) stretch of beach. Costing £20 million, the scheme will protect the villages of Bacton and Walcott as well as the gas terminal. The sea defences, designed by Dutch engineering company Royal HaskoningDHV, are expected to protect the site for between 15 and 20 years. The enhanced beach will be 7 metres (23 ft) high and extend up to 250 metres (820 ft) out to sea. The scheme was inspired by an experiment in the Netherlands called the Zandmotor. £14.5 million of the cost of the scheme will be covered by the Bacton gas terminal operators, with £5 million being contributed by the Environment Agency and £0.5 million from North Norfolk District Council. In October 2021 the BBC reported that a sand bar had formed offshore which the sand at the base of the cliff had formed a ledge with a drop of 3m: the bar was breaking the energy of the waves and erosion of cliffs halted with improvements also noted at nearby Walcott.
