= West Sole gas field =

UK natural gas field in the North Sea

- Country: United Kingdom
- Region: Southern North Sea
- Location/blocks: 48/6
- Offshore/onshore: Offshore
- Coordinates: 53°42′N 1°06′E (West Sole alpha)
- Operators: BP (1967-2012), Perenco (2012- )

Field history
- Discovery: 1965
- Start of development: 1966
- Start of production: 1967
- Peak of production: 2.28 Billion cubic metres per year
- Peak year: 1972

Production
- Recoverable gas: 57.00×10^{9} m^{3} (2.013×10^{12} cu ft)
- Producing formations: Rotliegendes

The West Sole gas field is a natural gas and associated condensate field located under the North Sea 44 miles (70 km) off the East Yorkshire coast. It was discovered on December 1965 and was the first gas field in the North Sea. A few days after the discovery, on December 28, 13 people were killed when the Sea Gem capsized whilst moving to its second well site in the new field.

== The field ==
The West Sole gas field is a substantial natural gas field located in the UK North Sea. The field is named after the Sole Pit area of the southern North Sea beneath which the field is situated. The gas reservoir is a Rotliegendes sandstone of Lower Permian age located at a depth of 9,000 feet (2,740 m) with a thickness of 262–430 feet (80–131 m). The reservoir is capped by Zechstein salt. The West Sole structure runs north-west to south-east and is about 12 miles long and 3 miles wide (19 km by 4.8 km). It was discovered in 1965 and extends over Block 48/6 only. The original determination of the gas in place amounted to 57 billion cubic metres. The field was originally licensed to BP Exploration UK Ltd, in 2012 ownership was transferred to Perenco UK Ltd. Production from the field began in March 1967; this was the first British offshore natural gas delivered onshore for commercial use. Gas and associated condensate are exported from the field via two pipelines (16 inch and 24 inch diameter) to the Easington gas terminal, East Yorkshire.

The West Sole gas composition and properties are as follows.

West Sole gas properties
Composition	%
Methane	94.0
Ethane	3.2
Propane	0.6
Butane	0.2
Pentane	0.1
Hexane	0.1
Heptane	Trace
Nitrogen	1.5
Carbon dioxide	0.2
Gas gravity	0.594%
Mean condensate content	2.0 bbl/million cu ft
Calorific value	1024 Btu/cu ft

== Development ==
The West Sole and adjacent fields have been developed through a number of offshore installations.

West Sole field offshore installations
Installation	Block	Platform	Function	Type	Legs	Well slots	Installed	Production start	Production to	Export pipeline, length, diameter	Pipeline number
West Sole WA complex	48/6	West Sole WA main platform	Drilling & production	Steel jacket	14	4	July 1966	March 1967	Easington	70 km, 16-inch	PL28
West Sole WA complex	48/6	West Sole WAP platform	Drilling & production	Steel jacket	4	–	July 1966	March 1967	WB platform	–	
West Sole WA complex	48/6	West Sole WAS platform	Drilling	Steel jacket	4	3	August 1974	1974	WA main platform	–	
West Sole WB	48/6	West Sole WB platform	Drilling & production	Steel jacket	16	6	November 1966	March 1967	Easington	70 km, 24-inch	PL145
West Sole WC	48/6	West Sole WC platform	Drilling & production	Steel jacket	16	6	August 1969	1970	WB platform	4 km, 12-inch	PL94
West Sole WE		West Sole WE platform	Drilling	Steel jacket	4	1	July 1967	1967, platform removed 1978	WA main platform		
Hyde	48/6	Hyde platform	Production	Steel jacket		3	1993	July 1993	WB platform	11.5 km, 14-inch	PL937
Newsham	47/7a	–	Production	Subsea	–	1	1996	June 1996	WA platform	12.4 km, 8-inch	PL1171
Hoton	48/7	Hoton platform	Production	Steel jacket				2002	WB platform	11.8 km, 8-inch	PL1875
Babbage	48/2	–	Production	Subsea	–		2010	August 2010	WB platform	27.9 km, 12-inch	PL2612
Seven Seas	48/7c	–	Production	Subsea	–	1	2012	2012	Newsham	8.1 km, 8-inch	PL2641

Some of these installations were one of the 'Villages' gas fields; named after villages lost to the sea along the Holderness coast. These villages include: Cleeton, Dimlington, Hoton, Hyde, Newsham and Ravenspurn.

Gas production from the fields is summarised on the table.

Production data
Field	Recoverale or gas in place, bcm	Peak production, bcm/y	Peak production year	Cumuative production to end of 2014, mcm
West Sole	57	2.28	1972	57,619
Hyde	4.22	0.46	1994	3,764
Newsham	1.36	0.127	1997	768
Hoton		0.420	2002	2,385
Babbage	5.0	0.518	2011	1,213
Seven seas		0.153	2013	182

Note: mcm = million cubic metres, bcm = billion cubic metres.

Up to the end of 1977 18,154 mcm had been produced.

Production profile, in mcm/y, of the West Sole gas field

== See also ==
- Indefatigable gas field
- Leman gas field
- Hewett gas field
- Viking gas field
- Clipper gas field
