= Clipper gas field =

UK natural gas reservoir and gas production facility

- Country: United Kingdom
- Region: North Sea
- Location/blocks: 48/19a
- Offshore/onshore: Offshore
- Coordinates: 53°27′37″N 1°43′56″E
- Operators: Shell
- Owner: Shell/Exxon

Field history
- Discovery: March 1968
- Start of production: 1990

Production
- Recoverable gas: 22.5×10^{9} m^{3} (790×10^{9} cu ft)
- Producing formations: Lower Permian Leman Sandstone

The Clipper gas field is a major natural gas reservoir and gas production facility in the UK sector of the southern North Sea. The field is located about 73 km north-north-east of Bacton, Norfolk; the Clipper production facility has operated since 1990.

== The fields ==
The Clipper field was discovered by Shell in March 1968 in Block 48/19a, part of the Sole Pit area. The gas reservoir is a Lower Permian Leman Sandstone Formation. The field is jointly owned by ESSO E&P UK Ltd (50 %) and Shell UK Ltd (50 %). The field was anticipated to have recoverable reserves of 22.5 billion cubic metres (bcm).

In addition to Clipper, the adjacent fields produced natural gas to the Clipper facility.

Clipper area fields
| Field | Block | Date discovered | Reserves, bcm (note 1) | Original owner | Owner / operator in 2014 |
|---|---|---|---|---|---|
| Clipper | 48/19a | March 1968 | 22.5 | Shell/Exxon | Shell |
| Barque | 48/13a | December 1966 | 37.3 | Shell/Exxon | Shell |
| Barque South | 48/13a | December 1966 | 1.0 | Shell/Exxon | Shell |
| Galleon | 48/14, 48/19a, 48/20a | December 1975 | 40.40 | Shell/Exxon | Shell |
| Cutter | 49/9a | | | Shell/Exxon | Shell |
| Carrack | 49/14b, 49/15a | | 15.0 | Shell/Exxon | Shell |
| Skiff | 48/20a | | | Shell/Exxon | Shell |
| Clipper South | 48/19a | 1982 | 13.4 | RWE Dea, Fairfield, Bayern Gas | Ineos, Spirit Energy |

note 1. Reserves are in billion cubic metres (bcm).

The Clipper, Barque, Galleon, Cutter, Carrack, and Skiff fields are named after sailing vessels.

Clipper South was owned by RWE Dea UK (50%), Fairfield Energy (25%), and Bayern Gas (25%). RWE Dea and Fairfield sold their interests to Ineos in 2015. The field is owned by Ineos and Spirit Energy.

== Development ==
The Clipper field was developed by Shell as a central 3-platform bridge linked complex. Three further bridge-linked platforms were added later. In addition to its own gas, Clipper was designed to be a central hub to receive and process well fluids from the surrounding installations. Processed gas was transmitted by pipeline from Clipper to the Bacton Gas Terminal, Norfolk. The main design parameters of the Clipper area installations are summarized in the table.

Clipper area installations
| Installation name | Block | Coordinates | Function | Water depth, metres | Type | Production to |
|---|---|---|---|---|---|---|
| Clipper PW | 48/19a | 53.459167 1.731944 | Wellhead | 26 | Fixed steel | Bacton via 45 mile 24” pipeline |
| Clipper PT | 48/19a | 53.460278 1.732222 | Production | 26 | Fixed steel | Bacton via 45 mile 24” pipeline |
| Clipper PC | 48/19a | 53.537633 1.870256 | Compression | 26 | Fixed steel | Bacton via 45 mile 24” pipeline |
| Clipper PM | 48/19a | | Metering, compression | 26 | Fixed steel | Bacton via 45 mile 24” pipeline |
| Clipper PR | 48/19a | | Risers | 26 | Fixed steel | Bacton via 45 mile 24” pipeline |
| Clipper PH | 48/19a | | Accommodation | | | Bacton via 45 mile 24” pipeline |
| Barque PB | 48/13a | 53.601667 1.526694 | Wellhead and production | 22 | Fixed steel | Clipper via 15 mile 16” pipeline |
| Barque PL | 48/13a | 53.571743 1.638452 | Wellhead and production | 23 | Fixed steel | Clipper via 15 mile 16” pipeline |
| Galleon PM | 48/19 | 53.535667 1.876458 | Wellhead and production | 28 | Fixed steel | Clipper |
| Galleon PN | 48/20 | 53.569622 1.921967 | Wellhead and production | 28 | Fixed steel | Clipper |
| Cutter QC | 49/9a | 53.695609 2.623801 | Wellhead and production | 35 | Fixed steel | Carrack QA |
| Carrack QA | 49/14 | 53.579560 2.792291 | Wellhead and production | 30 | Fixed steel | Clipper |
| Carrack Manifold | 49/14b | 53.706317 2.867689 | Manifold | 31 | Subsea | Carrack QA |
| Carack East WHPS | 49/15a | 53.673789 3.027539 | Wellhead | 31 | Subsea | Carrack Manifold |
| Carrack West WHPS | 49/14b | 53.743256 2.842561 | Wellhead | 29 | Subsea | Carrack Manifold |
| Skiff PS | 48/20a | 53.589292 1.891197 | Wellhead and production | 26 | Fixed steel | Clipper |
| Clipper South | 48/19a | 53.446309 1.797583 | Wellhead and production | | Fixed steel | Clipper |

Gas from Clipper South was originally routed to the ConocoPhillips LOGGS installation thence to Theddlethorpe gas terminal (TGT). When TGT closed in August 2018 a new pipeline was installed to route gas from Clipper South to Clipper.

As part of the Clipper development new pipeline reception facilities and process plant was installed at the Shell terminal at the Bacton gas terminal.

== Gas production ==
Production facilities on the Clipper complex include bulk liquid removal, 5 centrifugal two-stage compression with a capacity of 2 x 200 MMSCFD (million standard cubic feet per day).

Gas production from Clipper and the connected fields is summarised in the table, data includes the peak rate and the cumulative production over the period 1990 to 2014.

Gas Production
| Name | Production start | Peak flow, mcm/y | Peak year | Cumulative production to 2014 |
|---|---|---|---|---|
| Clipper | 1990 | 1,109 | 1992 | 13,876 |
| Barque | 1990 | 2,244 | 1997 | 23,067 |
| Barque South | 2014 | | | 16 |
| Galleon | 1994 | 1,501 | 1997 | 19,887 |
| Cutter | 2006 | 466 | 2008 | 2,410 |
| Carrack | 2003 | 1,220 | 2004 | 6,262 |
| Skiff | 2000 | 1,339 | 2003 | 7,828 |
| Clipper South | 2012 | 587 | 2013 | 385 |

Production profile, in mcm/y, of the Clipper field
Production profile, in mcm/y, of the Barque field

== See also ==
- Bacton gas terminal
- List of oil and gas fields of the North Sea
- West Sole gas field
- Lincolnshire Offshore Gas Gathering System
