= Indefatigable gas field =

UK natural gas field in the North Sea

- Country: United Kingdom
- Region: Southern North Sea
- Location/blocks: 49/18, 49/19, 49/23, 49/24
- Offshore/onshore: Offshore
- Coordinates: 53°19′19″N 2°34′30″E
- Operators: Amoco, Perenco, Shell

Field history
- Discovery: 1966
- Start of development: 1970
- Start of production: 1971
- Peak of production: 1976-1980

Production
- Peak of production (gas): 740 million cubic feet per day (21×10^{6} m^{3}/d)
- Producing formations: Rotliegendes sandstone

The Indefatigable gas field is a large natural gas and associated condensate field located under the North Sea 60 miles (98 km) off the Norfolk coast.

== The field ==
The Indefatigable gas field is a natural gas field located in the North Sea. The field is 67 miles (107 km) north-east of Great Yarmouth and is named after the Indefatigable Banks, a shallow sand bank beneath which it is situated. The gas reservoir is a Rotliegendes sandstone 200–300 feet (61–91 m) thick at a depth of 8000–9000 feet (2440–2740 m). It was discovered in June 1966 and extends over several blocks: 49/18, 49/19, 49/23 and 49/24. The original determination of the gas in place amounted to 126 billion cubic metres. Blocks 49/18 and 49/23 were originally licensed to Amoco (since 2003 to Perenco UK Limited) and Block 49/19 and 49/24 to Shell. Production from the field began in September and October 1971. Gas and associated condensate are produced via the Leman gas field to the Bacton Gas terminal, Norfolk.

The Indefatigable gas composition and properties are as follows.

Composition	%
Methane	91.8
Ethane	3.39
Propane	0.85
i-butane	0.16
n-butane	0.20
i-pentane	0.07
Hexanes	0.06
Heptanes plus	0.16
Nitrogen	2.73
Carbon dioxide	0.52
Hydrogen sulfide	Nil
Gas gravity	0.61 %
Mean condensate content	3.0 bbl/million cubic foot
Btu rating	1015 Btu/cubic foot

=== Baird gas field ===
The Baird gas field is located in Block 49/23 and is licensed to Perenco (originally Amoco). It was discovered in September 1993 and has recoverable reserves of 1.82 billion cubic metres. Gas is produced via a seabed well assembly and a pipeline to Inde 49/23 D. The peak production was 0.66 billion cubic metres per year.

== Development ==
The Indefatigable field has been developed through a number of offshore installations.

The Inde installations developed by Amoco, now owned by Perenco, were:

Perenco (former Amoco) Inde installations
Installation	Location Block	Platforms	Function	Type	Legs	Well slots	Installed	Production start	Production to
Inde A Complex	49/18	Inde AD	Drilling	Steel jacket	8	12	July 1970	September 1971	Inde AT
Inde A Complex	49/18	Inde AP	Production	Steel jacket	8	–	1970	September 1971	Inde AT
Inde B Complex	49/18	Inde BD	Drilling	Steel jacket	8	12	1973	June 1974	Inde AT
Inde B Complex	49/18	Inde BP	Production	Jackup	4	–	1973	June 1974	Inde AT
Inde C Complex	49/23	Inde CD	Drilling	Steel jacket	8	12	August 1976	July 1977	Inde AT
Inde C Complex	49/23	Inde CP	Production	Steel jacket	8	–	1976	July 1977	Inde AT
Inde Compression	49/23	Inde AT	Pipeline terminal	Steel jacket	6	–	May 1971	September 1971	Leman 49/27B
Inde Compression	49/23	Inde AC	Compression	Steel jacket	12	–	Jacket June 1979, topsides Summer 1980	November 1980	–
Inde Compression	49/23	Inde AQ	Accommodation	Steel jacket	4	–	June 1979	–	–
Inde D	29/23	Inde D	Wellheads and production	Steel jacket	4	4	1990	1990	Inde C

The Perenco Indefatigable 49/23A complex also receives gas from other fields and third parties:

- Bessemer (49/23E) installation and its satellite N.W. Bell (49/23-9) via a 14.5 km 16-inch pipeline.
- Wenlock (49/12A) installation owned by Alpha Petroleum via a 36.231 km 8-inch pipeline. A three well-slot installation was installed in the Wenlock field in 2006 with wells commissioned in 2007, 2008 and 2009. Production declined quickly and make the installation uneconomic and a Decommissioning Programme application was submitted to the Oil & Gas Authority in 2021.
- Davy (49/30A) installation and its satellites Davy North (49/30A-7A) and Davy East (53/5B-7) via a 43 km 16-inch pipeline.

The Inde installations developed by Shell were:

Shell Inde installations
Installation	Location Block	Platforms	Function	Type	Legs	Well slots	Installed	Production start	Production to
Inde J Complex	49/24	Inde JD	Drilling/production	Steel jacket	8	6	June 1970, April 1971	September 1971	Inde AT
Inde J Complex	49/24	Inde JP	Satellite (accommodation)	Steel jacket	4	–	April 1972	–	–
Inde K Platform	49/24	Inde K	Drilling/production/ accommodation	Steel jacket	10	6	July 1971, June 1972	March 1973	Inde AT
Inde L Platform	49/24	Inde L	Drilling/production	Steel jacket	6	6	February 1977	October 1978	Inde K
Inde M Platform	49/19	Inde M	Drilling/production	Steel jacket	4	4	Spring 1985	October 1985	Inde J
Inde N Platform		Inde N	Drilling/production	Steel jacket	4	4	1980's		Inde K

Production from the Shell Inde field ceased in 2005, Inde J, K, L, M, and N were subsequently decommissioned and removed.

== Production ==
Annual gas production from the Shell Indefatigable field (in million standard cubic feet)

== See also ==
- Leman gas field
- Hewett gas field
- West Sole gas field
- Viking gas field
- Sean gas field
- Davy, Bessemer, Beaufort, Brown and Boyle gas fields
