= Leman gas field =

Natural gas field in the North Sea

- Country: United Kingdom
- Region: North Sea
- Block: 49/26; 49/27
- Offshore/onshore: offshore
- Coordinates: 53.082184°N 2.168079°E
- Operator: Perenco

Field history
- Discovery: 1966
- Start of production: 1969

Production
- Current production of gas: 5.7×10^{6} m^{3}/d 200×10^{6} cu ft/d 2.1×10^{9} m^{3}/a (74×10^{9} cu ft/a)
- Estimated gas in place: 316×10^{9} m^{3} 11×10^{12} cu ft

The Leman gas field is a natural gas field located in the North Sea 30 miles (48 km) northeast of Great Yarmouth, United Kingdom. Named after the Leman Sandbank beneath which it is situated, the gas reservoir is a 18 miles (29 km) long, 5 miles (8.0 km) wide, 800 ft (240 m) thick Rotliegendes sandstone reservoir at a depth of about 6,000 ft (1,800 m).

Following its discovery in August 1966, the reservoir was divided into blocks 49/26 and 49/27 to facilitate the licensing of mineral rights. Block 49/26 has been licensed to Shell since the beginning, with Block 49/27 originally licensed to the Amoco-Gas Council joint venture before being transferred to Perenco UK Ltd. Production of natural gas and condensates began in 1968, with both products sent via pipeline systems to the Bacton Gas Terminal on the coast of Norfolk for international distribution.

The initial total proven reserves of the Leman gas field were around 11 trillion ft^{3} (316 km^{3}), with a production rate of around 200 million ft^{3}/day (5.7×10^{5} m^{3}).

== Development ==
The Shell Leman 49/26A (AD1, AD2, AP & AK) installation began production in August 1968. It had initial recoverable reserves of 292 billion m^{3}. It is connected to the Shell terminal at Bacton. Leman 49/26B (BT & BH) and 49/26B (BP & BD) began production in November 1970. Leman 49/26C (CD & CP) began in February 1972. Leman 49/26D began in August 1974. Leman 49/26E started in August 1983. Leman 49/26F and 49/26G began in September 1987. The Leman complex of platforms are connected to Bacton via Leman 49/26A, which is east of the Hewett complex. A decommissioned 36-inch pipeline formerly delivered gas from Leman 49/26BT to Bacton. Gas and condensate is piped to Bacton via Leman 49/26A Complex (AK, AP, AD1 and AD2).

The installations developed by Shell were:

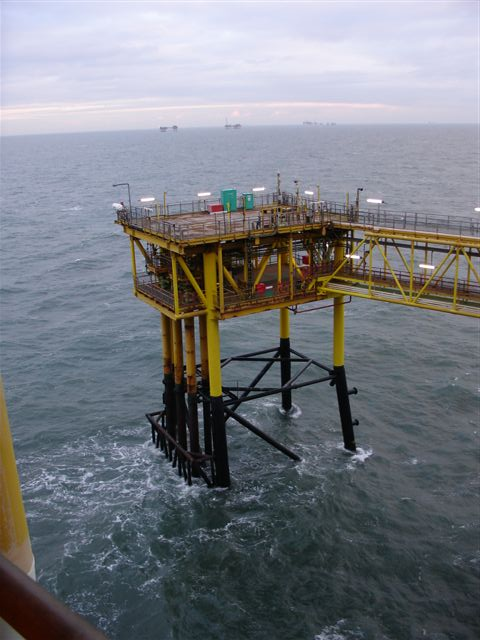
Leman 26AD2 North Sea offshore platform and other platforms in the Leman field

Shell Leman installations
Installation	Location Block	Platforms	Function	Type	Legs	Well slots	Installed	Production start	Production to
Leman A Complex	49/26	Leman AD1	Drilling	Steel jacket	12	20	June 1967	August 1968	
Leman A Complex	49/26	Leman AD2	Drilling	Steel jacket	4	3	September 1969	1970	
Leman A Complex	49/26	Leman AP	Production	Steel jacket	12	–	August 1967	August 1968	Bacton, Leman BT
Leman A Complex	49/26	Leman AK	Compression (900 MMSCFD)	Steel jacket	8	–	February 1975	1975	
Leman B Complex	49/26	Leman BD	Drilling	Steel jacket	12	24	June 1969	November 1970	
Leman B Complex	49/26	Leman BP	Production (500 MMSCFD)	Steel jacket	8	–	December 1969	November 1970	Leman BT
Leman C Complex	49/26	Leman CD	Drilling	Steel jacket	12	20	1971	February 1972	
Leman C Complex	49/26	Leman CP	Production (650 MMSCFD)	Steel jacket	8	–	1971	February 1972	Leman BT
Leman D platform	49/26	Leman D	Drilling, production (500 MMSCFD) and accommodation	Steel jacket	12	19	1971/3	September 1974	Leman BT
Leman E platform	49/26	Leman E	Drilling, production (240 MMSCFD) and accommodation	Steel jacket	6	10	January 1982	September 1983	Leman BP
Leman F platform	49/26	Leman F	Drilling, production and accommodation	Steel jacket					Leman AP
Leman G platform	49/26	Leman G	Drilling, production and accommodation	Steel jacket					Leman F
Leman BT BK BH Complex	49/26	Leman BT	Field terminal	Steel jacket	6	–	June 1970		Bacton
Leman BT BK BH Complex	49/26	Leman BK	Compression (900 MMSCFD)	Steel jacket	8	–	February 1975	1975	
Leman BT BK BH Complex	49/26	Leman BH	Accommodation	Steel jacket	4	–	February 1981	–	–

The Shell Leman 49/26A complex also receives gas from the Corvette CV installation (Block 49/24) via a 36.6 km, 20-inch pipeline.

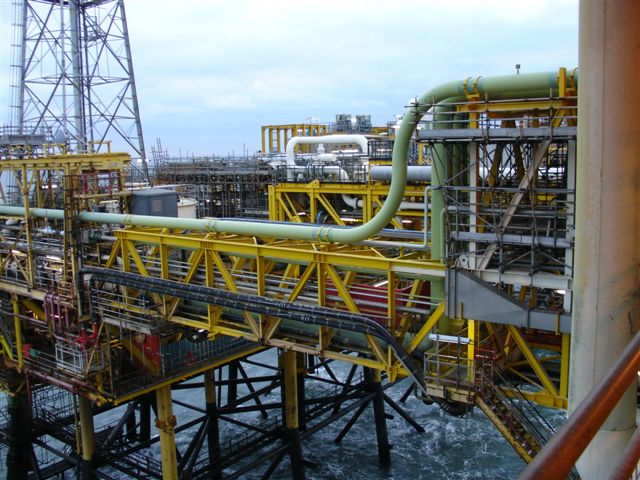
Shell Leman 26A North Sea platform

Block 49/27 of the Leman field is licensed to, and operated by, Perenco UK Ltd, originally by the Gas Council-Amoco. BP took over the interests of Amoco in 1998 and operated as BP-Amoco, subsequently BP. Perenco UK Ltd took over the interests of BP in the Leman and Indefatigable fields and BP plant at Bacton in 2003. The field had initial recoverable reserves of 292 billion m^{3}. It comprises the following installations, platforms and complexes: Leman 49/27A (AD, AP, AC, AQ, AX); 49/27B (BD, BP, BT); 49/27C (CD, CP); 49/27D (DD, DP); 49/27E (ED, EP); 49/27F (FD, FP); 49/27G; 49/27H; and 49/27J. Gas is routed to Bacton via two 30-inch pipelines from Leman 49/27A and Leman 49/27B.

The Leman installations developed by Amoco, now owned by Perenco, were:

Amoco (now Perenco) Leman installations
Installation	Location Block	Platforms	Function	Type	Legs	Well slots	Installed	Production start	Production to
Leman A Complex	49/27	Leman AD	Drilling	Steel jacket	8	12	August 1967	Easter 1969	Leman AP
Leman A Complex	49/27	Leman AP	Production	Steel jacket	6	–	July 1968	Easter 1969	Leman AC
Leman A Complex	49/27	Leman AC	Compression (900 MMSCFD)	Steel jacket	8	–	1975	October 1976	Bacton
Leman A Complex	49/27	Leman AQ	Accommodation	Steel jacket	4	–	March 1984	–	–
Leman A Complex	49/27	Leman AX	Compression (LP)	Steel jacket			1988	1989	Leman AC
Leman B Complex	49/27	Leman BD	Drilling	Steel jacket	8	12	May 1968		Leman BP
Leman B Complex	49/27	Leman BP	Production (171 MMSCFD)	Steel jacket	6	–	August 1968		
Leman B Complex	49/27	Leman BT	Field Terminal	Steel jacket	6	–	April 1970		Bacton
Leman C Complex	49/27	Leman CD	Drilling	Steel jacket	8	12	1967	1969	
Leman C Complex	49/27	Leman CP	Production (292 MMSCFD)	Steel jacket	6	–	1967	1969	Leman AP
Leman D Complex	49/27	Leman DD	Drilling	Steel jacket	8	12	1972	1973	
Leman D Complex	49/27	Leman DP	Production (300 MMSCFD)	Jack up	6	–	1973	1973	Leman BT
Leman E Complex	49/27	Leman ED	Drilling	Steel jacket	8	12	1972	1974	
Leman E Complex	49/27	Leman EP	Production (80-90 MMSCFD)	Steel jacket	4	–	1974	1974	Leman AP
Leman F Complex	49/27	Leman FD	Drilling	Steel jacket	8	12	1973	1975	
Leman F Complex	49/27	Leman FP	Production (337 MMSCFD)	Jack up	6	–	1975	1975	Leman BT
Leman G platform	49/27	Leman G	Production (300 MMSCFD)	Steel jacket		12	1985	October 1985	Leman BT
Leman H platform	49/27	Leman H	Production (250 MMSCFD)	Steel jacket	4	4	1984	1985	Leman J
Leman J platform	49/27	Leman J	Production (250 MMSCFD)	Steel jacket	4	4	1984	1985	Leman A

The Perenco Leman 49/27A complex also receives gas from the Camelot CA installation (Block 53/1a) via a 14.5 km, 12-inch pipeline.

In the mid-1990s the glycol dehydration facilities of several installations in the Inde and Leman fields was decommissioned. This enabled the installations to become normally unattended installations (NUIs) reducing manning costs and the risks to personnel.

== Production ==
The Leman gas composition and properties are as follows.

Composition	%
Methane	95.05
Ethane	2.86
Propane	0.49
i-butane	0.08
n-butane	0.09
i-pentane	0.03
n-pentane	0.02
Hexanes	0.02
Heptanes plus	0.04
Nitrogen	1.26
Helium	0.02
Carbon dioxide	0.04
Hydrogen sulphide	Nil
Total sulphur	<0.5
Gas gravity	0.585%
Mean condensate content	1.13 bbl/cubic foot
Btu rating	1024 Btu/ cubic foot

Annual gas production from the Shell Leman field (in million standard cubic feet)
Annual gas production from the Amoco Leman field (in million standard cubic feet)

== See also ==
- Indefatigable gas field
- Hewett gas field
- West Sole gas field
- Viking gas field
- Arthurian gas fields
- Brigantine, Caravel, Corvette and Shamrock gas fields
