= Prelude FLNG =

Floating liquefied natural gas platform

- Prelude FLNG in 2018

History
- Name: Prelude FLNG
- Owner: Shell plc
- Port of registry: Fremantle, Australia
- Builder: Samsung Heavy Industries, Geoje Shipyard, South Korea
- Cost: US$10−13 billion
- Laid down: October 2012
- Launched: December 2013
- Completed: July 2017
- Maiden voyage: July 2017
- In service: 2018
- Identification: IMO number: 9648714
- Status: Operational

General characteristics
- Type: Floating production storage and offloading
- Tonnage: 300,000 GT
- Displacement: 600,000 tonnes
- Length: 488 m (1,601 ft)
- Beam: 74 m (243 ft)
- Height: 105 m (344 ft)
- Crew: 220–240

Prelude FLNG is a floating liquefied natural gas (FLNG) platform owned by Shell plc and built by the Technip–Samsung Consortium (TSC) in South Korea for a joint venture between Royal Dutch Shell, KOGAS, and Inpex. The hull was launched in December 2013.

It is 488 metres (1,601 ft) long, 74 metres (243 ft) wide, 105 m (344 ft) tall, and made with more than 260,000 tonnes of steel, beating Seawise Giant (the previous record holder) as the world's longest vessel. The vessel displaces around 600,000 tonnes when fully loaded, more than five times the displacement of a Nimitz-class aircraft carrier. It is the world's largest FLNG platform, as well as the largest FLNG facility constructed to date.

== Construction ==
The main double-hulled structure was built by the Technip Samsung Consortium in the Samsung Heavy Industries Geoje shipyard in South Korea. Construction was officially started when the first metal was cut for the substructure in October 2012. The Turret Mooring System was subcontracted to SBM and built in Drydocks World Dubai, United Arab Emirates. The MEG (monoethylene glycol) reclamation unit by Fjords Processing Norway and built in South Korea is the only topside module subcontracted. Other equipment such as subsea wellheads were constructed at other locations around the world. It was launched on 30 November 2013 with no superstructure (accommodation and process plant). The vessel is moored by its turret to 16 seabed driven steel piles, each 65 m (213 ft) long and 5.5 m (18 ft) in diameter.

Subsea equipment was built by FMC Technologies, and Emerson is the main supplier of automation systems and uninterruptible power supply systems. By July 2015, all 14 gas plant modules were installed.

== Cost and funding ==
Prelude FLNG was approved for funding by Shell in 2011.

Analyst estimates in 2013 for the cost of the vessel were between US$10.8 to $12.6 billion. Shell estimated in 2014 that the project would cost up to US$3.5 billion per million tons of production capacity. Competitive pressures from an increase in the long-term production capabilities of North American gas fields due to hydraulic fracturing technologies and increasing Russian export capabilities may reduce the actual profitability of the venture from what was anticipated in 2011. In 2021, the WAToday news website reported that it was believed that the ship had cost at least US$17.5 billion, though Shell has never confirmed the actual cost.

== Operations ==
The Prelude FLNG system was built for use in the Prelude and Concerto gas fields in the Browse LNG Basin, 200 kilometres (120 mi) off the coast of Western Australia; drilling and gas production were planned to begin in 2016. The system has a planned life expectancy of 25 years. The Prelude and Concerto fields are expected to produce 5.3 million tonnes of liquid and condensate per year; this includes 3.6 million tonnes of liquefied natural gas, 1.3 million tonnes of condensate, and 400,000 tonnes of liquefied petroleum gas.

Natural gas will be extracted from wells and liquefied by chilling it to −162 °C (−260 °F). The ability to produce and offload LNG to large LNG carriers is an important innovation, which reduces costs and removes the need for long pipelines to land-based LNG processing plants. However, fitting all the equipment onto a single floating facility was a significant challenge.

The system is designed to withstand Category 5 cyclones, although workers may be evacuated before that on an EC225 rescue helicopter. According to plans, it will produce 110,000 BOE per day.

On 25 July 2017, after a journey of 5,800 km (3,600 mi) from its construction site in South Korea, Prelude arrived on site in Western Australian waters. It was expected to become operational in 2018. On 26 December 2018, Royal Dutch Shell announced that initial production had begun at Prelude. Shell said that wells had been opened and that the start-up and ramp-up phases were underway.

Prelude was shut down in February 2020 after a reported electrical problem. The platform had previously suffered two incidents that saw the unintended release of gas, which NOPSEMA described as "dangerous". It restarted production in January 2021.

The ship's electrical supply was disrupted by a small fire on 2 December 2021. This led to the cessation of production and the evacuation of most of the crew.

As a result of repeated environmental and safety mishaps, NOPSEMA ordered the supermajor not to resume production for an indefinite period of time, pending Shell's ability to prove updated practices. According to NOPSEMA, Shell "did not have a sufficient understanding of the risks of the power system on the facility, including failure mechanisms, interdependencies, and recovery", adding that "power loss directly impacted critical safety systems along with the ability to safely evacuate crew by boat or helicopter."

In April 2022, the vessel resumed operations. Operations were again partially stopped and then fully stopped during a strike which lasted 11 weeks until 25 August 2022.
