= Damen Verolme Rotterdam =

Damen Shiprepair Rotterdam, location Botlek
- Industry: Ship repair and Shipbuilding
- Founded: 1957
- Headquarters: Rotterdam, Netherlands
- Products: Ships

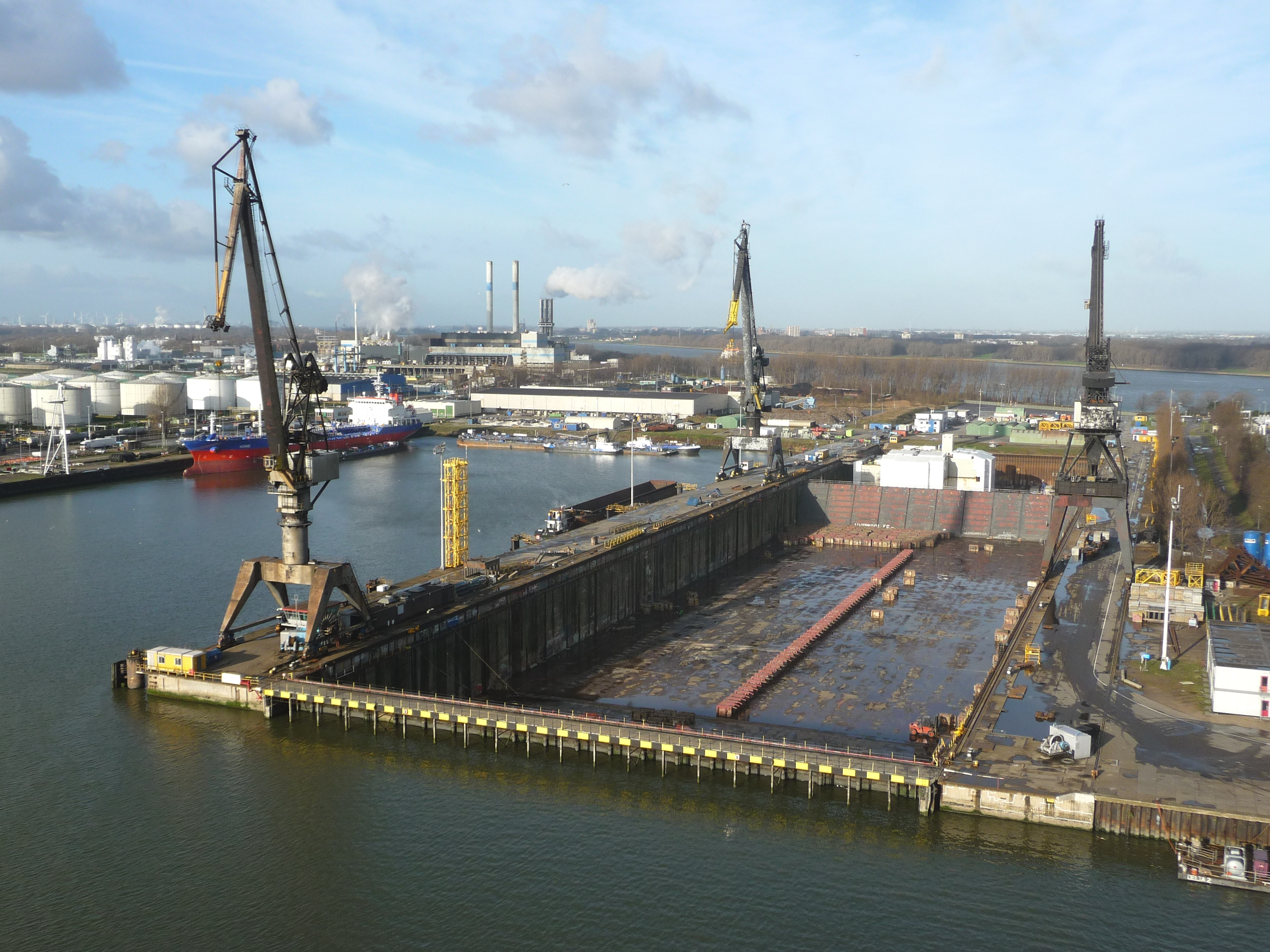
Dock 7 (1970)

Damen Shiprepair Rotterdam, is a repair shipyard in Rotterdam, Netherlands.

== History ==
=== Foundation ===
The company was founded in 1957 by Cornelis Verolme as Verolme Dok en Scheepsbouw Maatschappij (VDSM). In 1955 Verolme owned Verolme Verenigde Scheepswerven, a collection of two small Dutch shipyards and a small machine factory. Nevertheless, he decided to construct a huge shipyard, capable of meeting the demand for ever larger ships. Meanwhile, the Port of Rotterdam Authority was developing the Botlek industrial and harbor area near Rozenburg. In this empty space close to the sea on the deep Nieuwe Waterweg, Verolme wanted to realize his vision of shipbuilding and repair. Various slipways, drydocks and floating docks were built in the late 1950's, enabling the construction of supertankers and conversions of aircraft carriers. In 1970 a huge 405 x 90 m. drydock (dock nr. 7) was added.

=== RSV (1971-1983) ===
In 1971 the holding Verolme Verenigde Scheepswerven fused with Rijn-Schelde Machinefabrieken en Scheepswerven NV to become Rijn-Schelde-Verolme (RSV). RSV existed from 1971 to 1983 and ended in a financial catastrophe.

=== Verolme Botlek ===
The shipyard survived the dissolution of RSV. In 1981 it was renamed Verolme Botlek

=== Keppel Verolme ===
In 2002 the shipyard was bought by Keppel Corporation, and was henceforward known as Keppel Verolme.

== Part of Damen Group (current situation) ==
In 2017 the shipyard became part of the Damen Group, and received its current name. The Company has a large dry dock of 405 x 90m.

== Ships built ==
Name	Launched	Size	Note
Esso Cambria	10 May 1969	255,000 DWT	Tanker
Esso Nederland	20 December 1969	255,000 DWT	Tanker
Esso Europoort	11 July 1970	255,000 DWT	Tanker
Chevron Kentucky	20 March 1971	251,000 DWT	Tanker
Rudolph Peterson	4 October 1971	251,000 DWT	Tanker
Lepton	1974		Tanker
