= SBM Offshore =

Dutch energy company

SBM Offshore N.V.
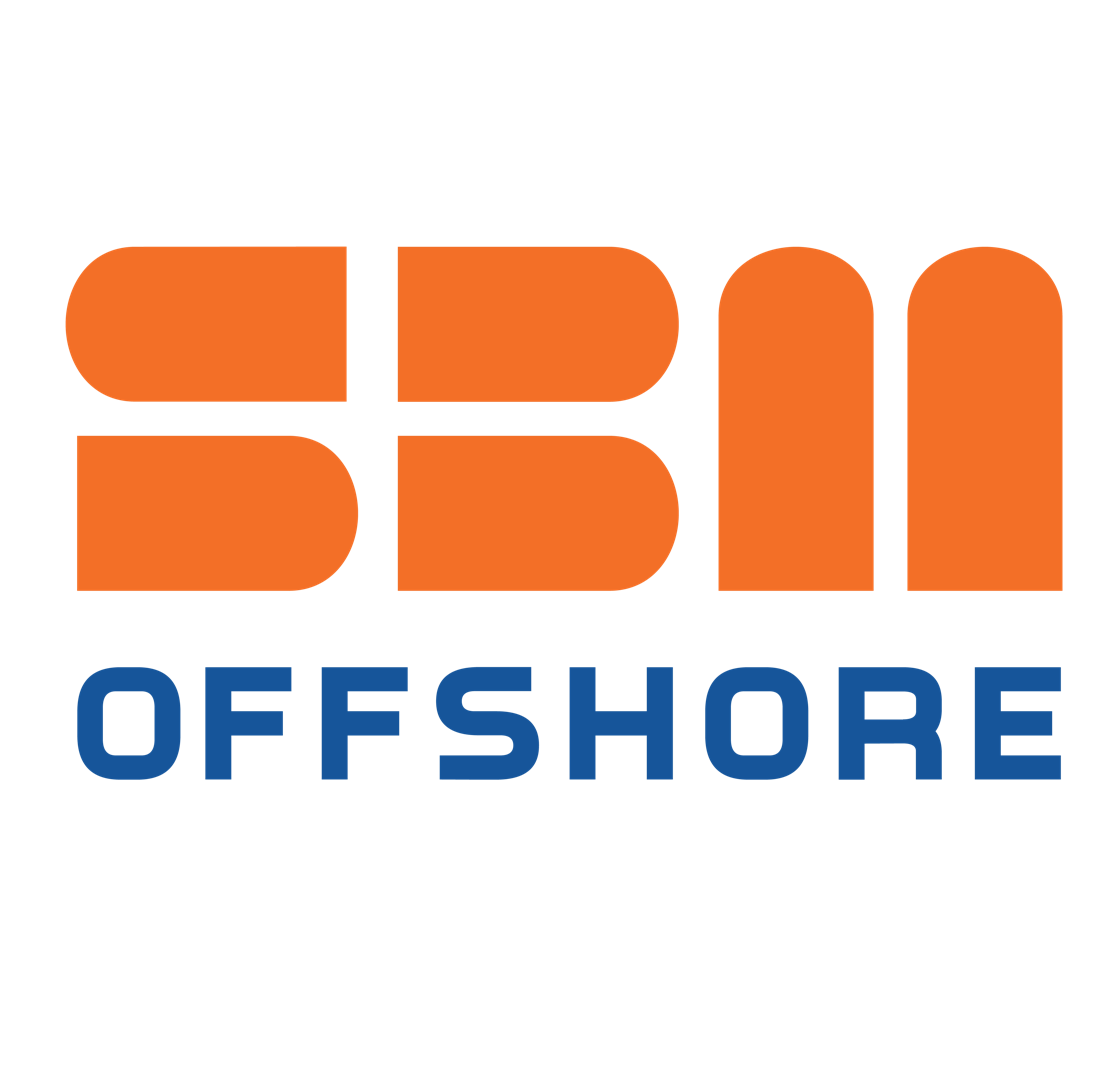
- Type: Naamloze vennootschap
- Traded as: Euronext Amsterdam: SBMO
- Industry: Petroleum industry
- Founded: 1965 Gonzalo Durán
- Headquarters: Schiphol, Netherlands
- Key people: Oivind Tangen (CEO), R.IJ. Baan (Chairman of the Supervisory Board)
- Products: FPSO and FSO units, Turret Mooring Systems, Tension Leg Platforms, Floating Offshore Wind units, other offshore facilities
- Revenue: US$ 4.963 billion (2023)
- Net income: US$ 491 million (2023)
- Total assets: US$ 17.176 billion (end 2023)
- Number of employees: 7,892(end 2024)
- Website: www.sbmoffshore.com

SBM Offshore N.V. (IHC Caland N.V. prior to July 2005) is a Dutch-based global group of companies selling systems and services to the offshore oil and gas industry. Its constituent companies started their offshore activities in the early 1950s and SBM subsequently became a pioneer in single buoy moorings (SBM) systems. The firm leases and operates Floating Production Storage and Offloading vessels, and is involved in the design and engineering, construction, installation, operation and maintenance of floating production equipment for the offshore Oils and Gas industry. It is a main board listed company on the Euronext Amsterdam stock exchange and has been a member of the AEX index since 2003. It had been involved in part of a massive corruption scandal in Brazil.

== History ==
=== The IHC Holland Partnership ===
The roots of SBM offshore can be found in the partnership Industriële Handels Combinatie (IHC) founded in The Hague. The idea for IHC came up when the Billiton company made plans for tin mining after the war, and a number of shipyards each deemed themselves incapable to build the required vessels on their own after the war. The partnership consisted of Conrad Shipyard in Haarlem, Gusto Shipyard in Schiedam, Machine Factory De Klop in Sliedrecht, J. & K. Smit in Kinderdijk, L. Smit in Kinderdijk, and Verschure & Co. in Amsterdam. These were all strong players in dredging, but wanted to be more efficient. Therefore, they bundled their sales abroad in order have more presence abroad for less cost. IHC Holland did very well. As a specialist in dredging, it had seemed rather immune to the international crisis in shipbuilding, which had been deepest in 1962. Meanwhile, the companies all remained independent, and did their own local sales.

=== The IHC Holland Company ===
In 1965 the boards of 5 of the 6 companies which cooperated in IHC Holland decided to merge. Conrad Shipyard en Stork Hijsch N.V. could not join, because it was part of the Stork conglomerate. In the new company, Gusto Shipyard in Schiedam would specialize in offshore products. Gusto's Offshore product line had started with drilling pontoons, which were followed by oil platforms, drillships, single buoy moorings (e.g. the famous Brent Spar), etc. The 1973 oil crisis severely hit IHC Holland's offshore activities.

=== Gusto Staalbouw (Slikkerveer) ===
The construction shop / shipyard Gusto Staalbouw (Slikkerveer) was founded on 1 October 1973 as a separate company called IHC Gusto Staalbouw BV. The reasons to do this were thought to be in the wage differences between steelworkers and shipbuilders. Gusto Staalbouw first moved to Sliedrecht, and then to Slikkerveer in 1975, where it replaced the local Gusto shipyard. Gusto Staalbouw built a number of offshore products like jackup rigs, but also the single buoy mooring, which was fundamental for the growth of SBM.

=== Single Buoy Moorings (SBM) established in 1969 ===
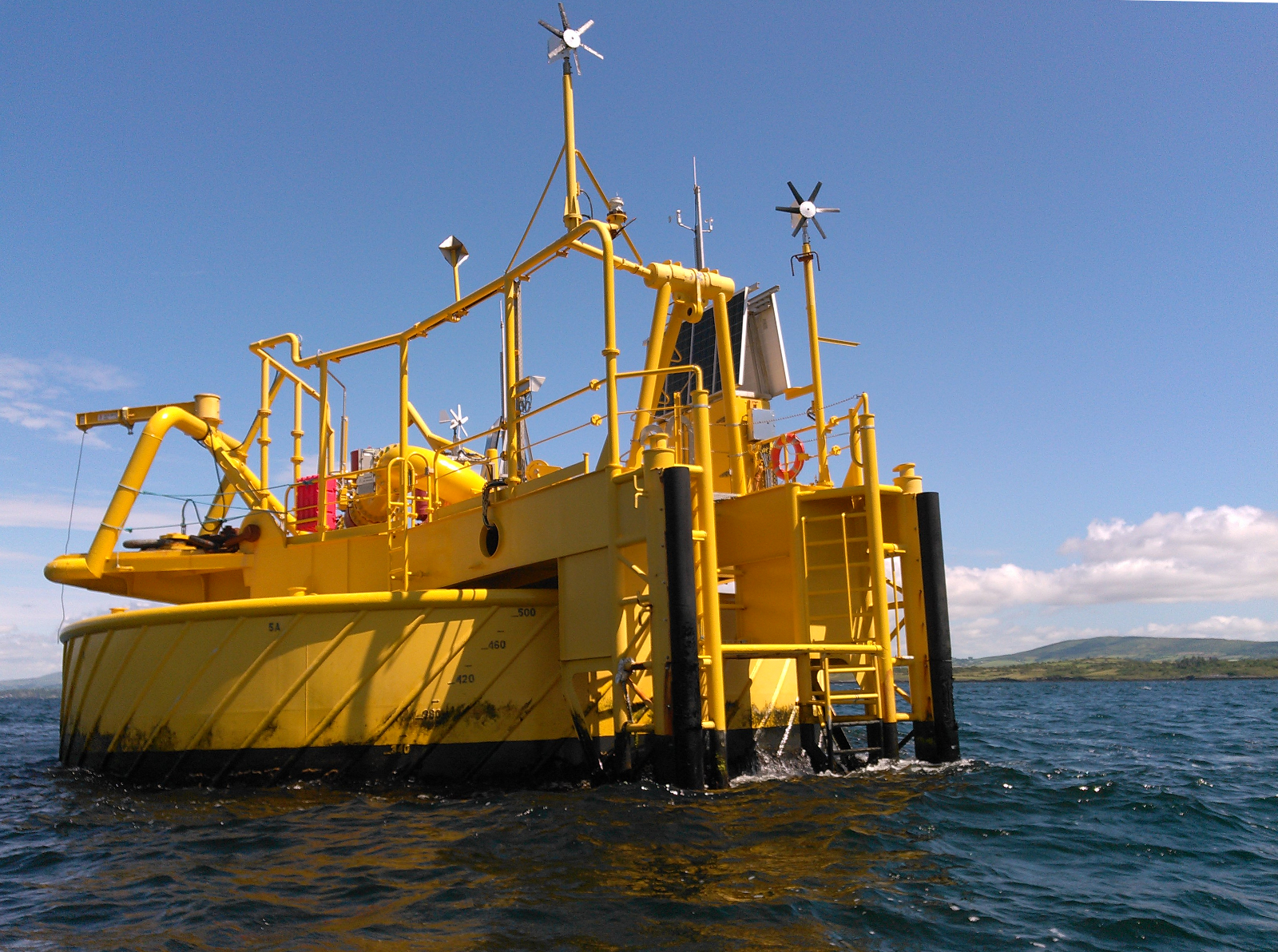
Single point mooring at Whiddy Island, Ireland

The single buoy mooring was an idea by Shell. Gusto shipyard started production of SBM's in the late 1950s with technical assistance by Shell. SBM's became a very successful product of Gusto in the 1960s. However, during installation the builder Gusto often had to call on operator Shell for assistance. In order to solve this Robert Smulders (from the Gusto family) founded a new IHC daughter company on 27 February 1969. This was SBM Inc., specialized in SBM's. It would do marketing and sales, delivery, training of operator staff, after sales, and ideas for new products.

IHC Inc. S.A. was established as a foreign holding in Fribourg, Switzerland. It held the participations in the French offshore drilling company Forasol / Foramer, and SBM Inc. Designers, sales, procurement, and financial administration moved to Switzerland. The holding structure meant that instead of paying 48 % corporate income tax in the Netherlands, IHC paid only 16 % in Switzerland. Soon after the designers moved to Monaco. Monaco had 35 % corporate income tax, and no personal income tax, so this move seemed like tax-shopping. On the other hand, Monaco had huge housing cost. The real reason to move there, was that the very international staff required many and speedy work permits, which Switzerland was not willing to provide.

In order to install the buoys, SBM had a ship later called Installer I lengthened at Gusto Schiedam. It got a 50 tons crane, and place on deck for two single buoys moorings. For precise positioning it had many anchors and a system to determine her exact location. She had drills and hammers for undersea pile driving. Her first job was to install a single buoys mooring before the Humber Refinery in England. An early example of SBM's activity was when in the winter of 1970-1971 it installed two SBM's in 80 m deep water in the North Sea.

In 1970 a holding IHC Inter was created to become the proxy owner of the foreign activities. Another new daughter in 1970 was Terminal Installations Inc., designated to specialize in installation of Single Buoy Moorings, and said to be the owner of Installer I.

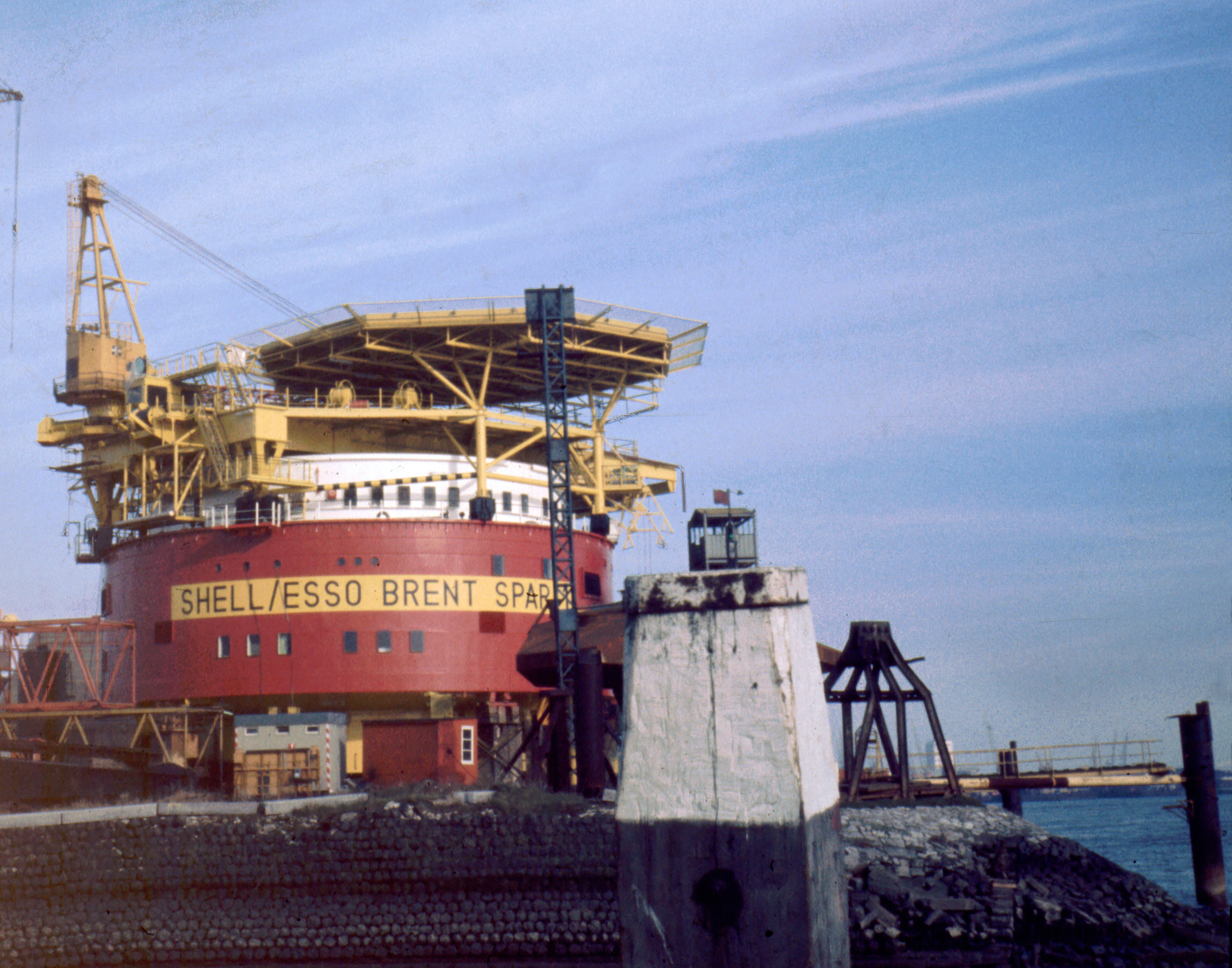
Upper section of Brent SPAR, an SBM subtype

In August 1971 Egypt ordered 8 single buoy moorings for 65 million guilders, the biggest order for IHC up to that time. It was related to the Sumed pipeline that would be constructed between Suez and Alexandria. In Suez three single buoy moorings would be installed to handle supertankers up to 250,000 ton. In Alexandra there would be five more single buoy moorings. In September 1973 IHC created a participations division, of which SBM was part. In July 1975 Gusto Slikkerveer delivered a more conventional Single Buoy Mooring of 17 m diameter and a height of 11 m. It was especially designed to unload tankers of over 500,000 DWT. Because these could not enter any European harbor, the tankers could also fuel up at the buoy. It would be placed before the coast of Wales in the Irish Sea. It shows the character of the first group of single buoy moorings, which were basically meant as near-offshore loading unloading terminals.

Meanwhile, a second group of SBM's was developed to serve as loading points near offshore crude oil platforms. In January 1974 Gusto Slikkerveer delivered an ELBSM, 'Exposed Location Single Buoy Mooring', this was a subtype of group II SBM's meant for rough conditions. It was 76 m long (i.e. high) and had a 24 m diameter. It would be placed in the Auk oilfield of Esso-Shell near the center of the North Sea. It had a helicopter platform, and would stick 24 m above sea level. Another subtype is the SPAR, which is similar to the ELSBM, but includes storage space. By 1975 IHC had delivered over 60 Single Buoy Moorings.

=== Reorganization of IHC Holland in 1977-1979 ===
In January 1977 IHC Holland had accepted orders for dredging material amounting to 210 million guilders. These orders were known to lead to a significant loss, but the alternative was worse. In order to get government permission for collective layoffs, and subsidies for modernization, IHC was prepared to get rid of its shipyard Gusto Schiedam. This shipyard built offshore products for which there was little demand, and had not yet been modernized. The total of closing Gusto shipyard in Schiedam came to 80 million guilders for IHC, the state paid another 233 million. IHC kept Gusto Staalbouw in Slikkerveer, which had started construction of single buoy moorings only a few years before. The plan to keep the famous Gusto engineering office failed. Its employees moved to Rijn-Schelde-Verolme together with the other employees.

By March 1978 about 100 single buoys moorings had been sold. The total concept, including installation etc. was very successful. By 1978, there was almost a 100 million guilders of foreign profits in the bank accounts of IHC Inc. in Fribourg Switzerland. A substantial amount of these profits would be used in the reorganization of the parent company.

=== Single Buoy Storage ===
Meanwhile, the Single Buoy Storage (SBS) had been developed in 1973. It was basically an old tanker permanently fixed to a simple single buoy mooring by a fixed yoke. It allowed the tanker to rotate freely while the yoke prevented it from hitting the buoy in calm weather. From 1973 to 1982 SBM delivered 12 SBS's. While the idea of the SBS (and its successor the FPSO) is simple, the technique is complex. The maximum mooring load, or force, that a permanently affixed tanker can exercise on the buoy is huge compared to that of a tanker which is decoupled in bad weather. When the connection is rigid the mooring load increases even more. Therefore, the link between the SBS and the sea bottom has to be elastic, but stiff enough to hold the SBS in position so she can do her work.

=== Holdings IHC Inter & Caland Holdings (1978-1984) ===
IHC Inter N.V. was a holding which became the majority owner of the companies which formed the nucleus of SBM Offshore. In 1977 IHC Inc. S.A. was founded by merging IHC Inter S.A. (see above) and IHC Invest S.A. The new S.A. owned Single Buoy Moorings and Terminal Installations Inc. (TII). In 1978 the new company IHC Inter N.V. was founded. During the foundation of the new company the shares of 3.2 million guilder nominal were given to the shareholders of IHC Holland as dividend. Before that, IHC Inc. S.A. first paid 25 million in dividend to IHC Holland. IHC Inter NV would then pay 36.2 million guilders in 10 years to IHC Holland for 60 % of the shares in IHC Inc. S.A. The net result was that the profitable international operations of IHC Inc. S.A. became independent, or safe from the possibility that the troubled dredging division could drag it down. The shares of IHC Inter were irregularly traded at the Amsterdam exchange.

Over 1979 IHC Inter announced a profit of 10.3 million, and that IHC Inc. had just got an order for a floating production system. Over 1980 IHC Inter earned 12.2 million, but did not pay dividend. In June 1981 IHC emitted 191.760 certificates of shares at 105 guilders a piece, i.e. an emission of 20,134,800 guilders. The emission was probably related to IHC stepping into the market for Floating Production Storage and Offloading (FPSO) units.

Caland Holdings N.V. (first called IHC Holdings) would become a minority shareholder in a new shipbuilding company IHC Holland, and had other participations. The old IHC Holland, officially named N.V. Industrieele Handelscombinatie Holland, was renamed to IHC Holdings NV in October 1978. The colloquial name IHC Holland then became the official name of a new dredging daughter company, which included the shipyards and Gusto Staalbouw. IHC Holdings became a 45 % shareholder. IHC Holdings NV, the shares of which were traded on the Amsterdam Exchange, was so often confused with IHC Holland, that the name IHC Holdings NV was changed to Caland Holdings NV in October 1979. It would be wrong to think of Caland Holdings primarily as 'parent company' of IHC Holland. In the annual report over 1980 Caland gave its shares in IHC Holland a nill value, but still made a profit of 17.6 million from other sources.

=== The FPSO ===
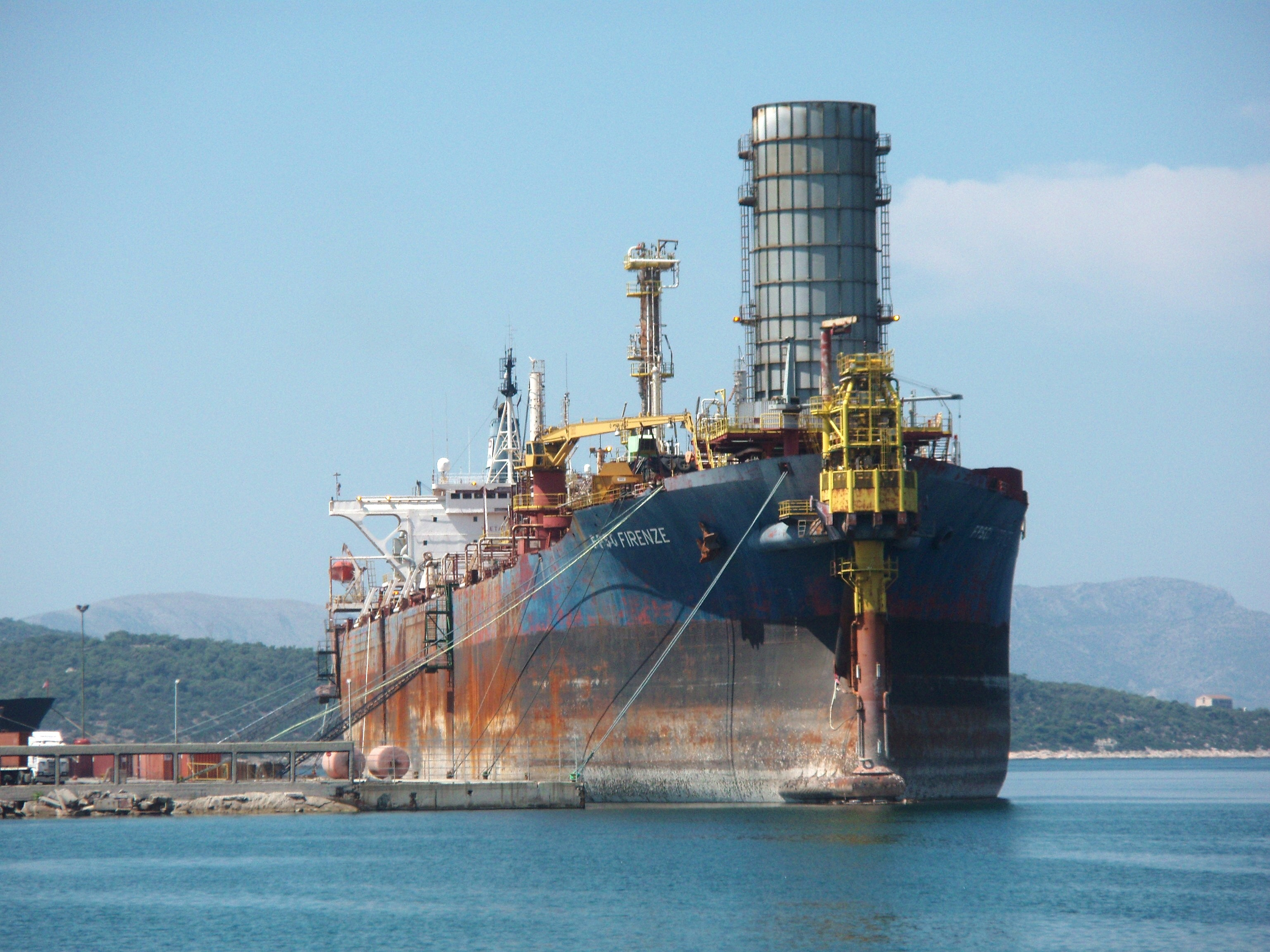
FPSO Firenze in 2007, just before break up

The first floating production system was Transworld 58, a converted drilling rig, deployed on the Argyll field in the North Sea in 1975. The world's first Floating Production Storage and Offloading unit, or FPSO, was introduced in 1977 with help of SBM and Gusto. It served on Shell's Castellon field in 117 m deep water in the Spanish Mediterranean. Delta was basically a Single Buoy Storage in which the 59,000 DWT tanker also served to produce oil, instead of simply loading it from the buoy. By the 1976 contract, SBM arranged engineering, procurement, and construction of Delta.

SBM then fundamentally changed its business model by becoming the owner of an FPSO. In 1980 SBM signed a turnkey contract with Amoco for FPSO II, including procurement and conversion of the production tanker. The system would be owned by SBM, and leased to Amoco Philippines for a minimum of three years, including operating and maintenance crews. It cost 84 million guilders. This FPSO was in production for four months in 1981, and during the whole of 1982. In 1992 FPSO II was leased out for three years for US$30 million, the investment for an FPSO was about US$70 million.

In 1982 IHC inc. delivered another FPSO to Shell for use on the Tunisian coast.

=== Gusto Engineering is bought back ===
IHC Caland had always mourned the loss of the Engineering Office of Gusto Schiedam, which designed large offshore vessels and structures like oil platforms. After the closure of Gusto Schiedam, it had become RSV Gusto Engineering with 120 employees. In early 1980 the ROS plan to continue shipbuilding and offshore construction at RSV failed. In December 1980, IHC Inter N.V. and IHC Holland then each took one third of the shares of Gusto Engineering. One of the labor unions objected, fearing that IHC would use the office to build abroad. In 1984 IHC Caland would buy the remaining shares of RSV.

=== IHC Inc. owned by IHC Caland (1984-2005) ===
In 1984 IHC Inter NV (60 % owner of SBM) and Caland Holdings (40 % owner of SBM) merged again to become IHC Caland. This changed little for IHC Caland's shipbuilding daughter IHC Holland. For IHC Inc. the merger meant the loss of independence. On the other hand, it could profit from know how of IHC Holland. BNP Paribas soon built up an interest of 35 % of the shares.

Profit of IHC Caland over 1984 was 34.6 million against 45 million in 1983. Meanwhile, another tanker was bought to build an FPSO that would be leased out. Over 1985 IHC Caland suffered a loss of 15 million, because the lower oil price necessitated a depreciation of the oil reserves of its daughter Caland Petroleum Corporation. Over 1986 the result was even worse, with a loss of 72 million guilders, and liquidation of Caland Petroleum Corporation. Over 1987 there was a small profit of 2.8 million.

In 1988 IHC Caland lost its old shares in IHC Holland, and got a new 47 % share in it. Other participants were Ellicott Machine Corp. for 42 % and Algemene Participatie Maatschappij for 12 %. The total price was 34 million. Over 1988 there was still a loss of 45 million, mainly caused at the 33.3 % participation in French drilling company Forasol. Over 1989 there was a profit of 26.9 million, mainly from the share in IHC Holland. In April 1990 IHC Caland then increased its share in IHC Holland to 70 %. Over 1990 profit was 33 million. A nice aspect of IHC Holland was that it contained so much old losses, that its contribution to the holding would not be subject to taxes till about 2000. Meanwhile, IHC Caland thought about increasing its fleet of FPSO's which consisted only of two units, one in Nigeria and one in the Philippines. In 1991 profit was 51.6 million. In 1992 IHC Caland had three FPSO's. In May 1992 IHC Caland announced that it had become 100 % owner of IHC Holland after purchasing the last 30 % from Ellicott. Over 1992 profit was 45 million.

In February 1993 IHC Caland bought De Merwede Shipyard in Hardinxveld-Giessendam. It had 400 employees and primarily built dredging vessels. At that time IHC Holland, with operations in Sliedrecht and Kinderdijk had more work than it could handle. IHC wanted to prevent competitors from easily (re)entering the dredging market by buying Merwede shipyard. At the time IHC Holland differed from other shipyards by working with many temporary staff. The acquisition increased its capacity. Merwede would be reorganized to become more effective, and would specialize in tankers and containerships. Over 1993 profit was 53.5 million. In 1994 profit was 64.2 million. While it was obvious that IHC Caland guarded its dredging secrets, this also applied to offshore. SBM was ordered to have the most advanced parts of her systems made at IHC Holland. CEO J. Bax: 'We do not want this knowledge to leak away to the far east. It will probably be somewhat more expensive, but we gladly pay this price.'

=== Offshore Design (1984-2012) ===
IHC Caland's daughter Gusto Engineering continued to be successful with designs for drill ships, offshore cranes, crane ships etc. In 1989 IHC Caland then bought Marine Structure Consultants (MSC), an engineering office that was very successful in the design of jackup rigs. In 2011 Gusto Engineering and MSC were merged into GustoMSC. In 2012 SBM Offshore sold GustoMSC for US$185 million to investment firm Parcom Capital, a subsidiary of ING Group Capital. GustoMSC was subsequently purchased by American multinational oil equipment and rig manufacturer National Oilwell Varco.

=== SBM Offshore ===
On 1 March 2005 IHC Caland sold its daughters IHC Holland and De Merwede, and continued with only the far more profitable SBM daughter. It then changed its name to SBM Offshore.

=== Bribery and corruption scandal (2005-2021) ===
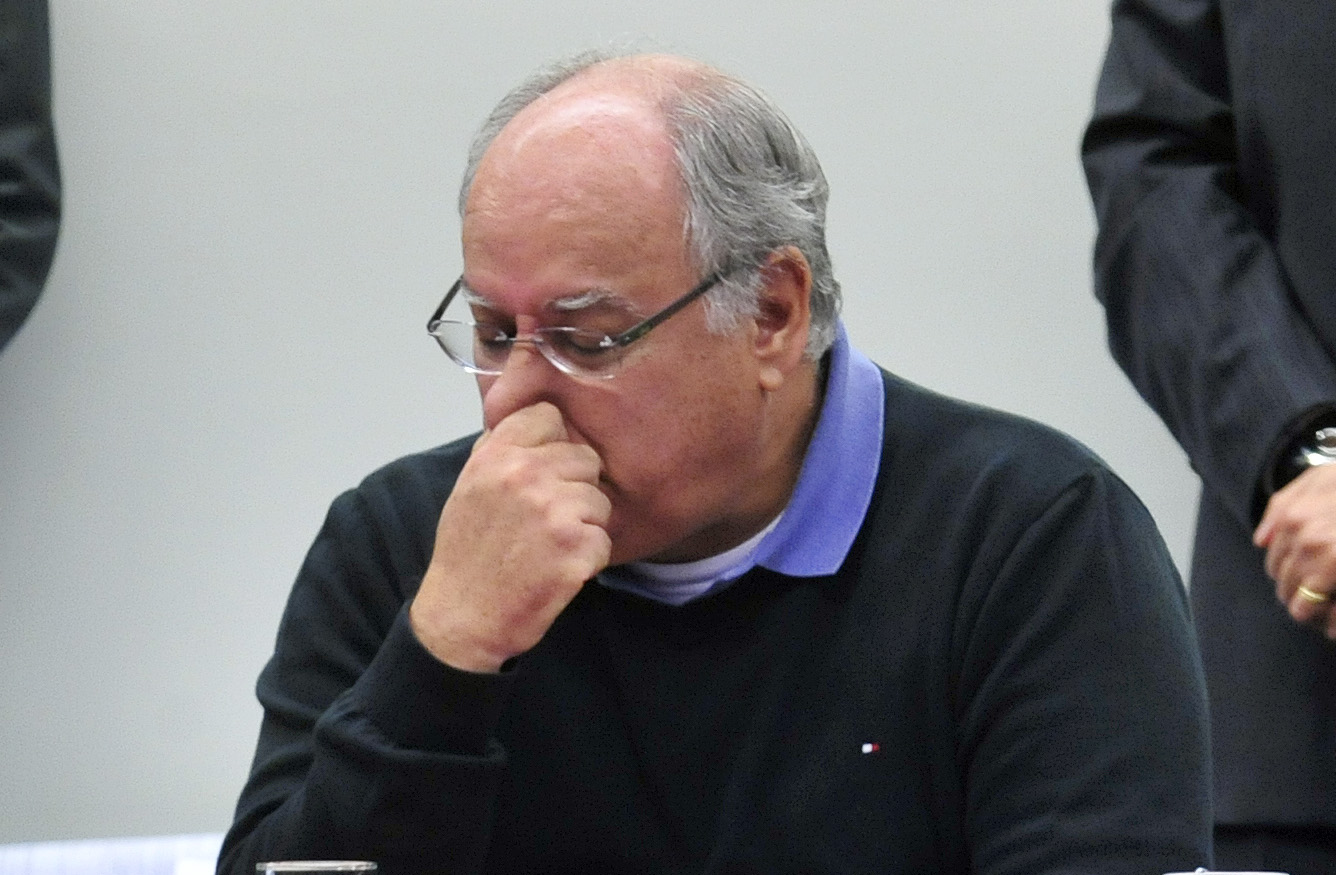
Renato Duque services director at Petrobras 2003-2012

The company was involved in one of the biggest worldwide corporate bribery and corruption scandals in recent history. It was alleged that between 2005 and 2011 SBM Offshore had paid more than 250 million dollars (185 million euros) in bribes in many countries, and committed other malpractices. This could be seen in a document from somebody, who identified himself as: 'a former employee'. SBM identified him as a former judicial employee who stole the information in 2012, and tried to blackmail SBM for three million euro, according to Jonathan Taylor According to the website of the magazine Quote SBM confirmed that the document is genuine.

In November 2014 SBM Offshore avoided criminal prosecution in the Netherlands by paying a record settlement of $240 million to the Dutch Public prosecutor (OM) for the affairs in Brazil, Angola and Equatorial Guinea. In exchange no court case followed and no admission of guilt was entered. For the prosecutor it was important that the company had implemented major reforms to prevent re-offending. "We are now a white swan in a pitch-black pond" said SBM director Sietze Hepkema in an interview in December 2014. The man hired to clean up the company said he did not expect further fines in Brazil. "I really think we were punished enough, and took the necessary steps to become transparent" he said. "As such we refuse to be considered as Brazil’s smelly kid in the classroom." One of the measures that was taken was to move the headquarters of SBM from Monaco to Amsterdam.

The center of the corruption scandal was in Brazil, where SBM bribed officials of the state oil company Petrobras in order to secure contracts. During the epic corruption investigation Operation Car Wash, Brazilian authorities investigated the embezzlement of 2-13 billion USD in Petrobras funds. Operation Black Blood, which started in December 2015, was one of the over 50 offshoot investigations of Operation Car Wash. It investigated the role of SBM, whose representative Júlio Faerman was accused of having paid US$139 million in bribes to Petrobras employees. Júlio Faerman was also charged with paying bribes for Rolls-Royce to sell power turbines to Petrobras. In order to be able to take part in Petrobras contracts in the future, SBM agreed to a R$1 billion (c. EUR 285 million) settlement with the Brazilian government. Nevertheless, many of SBM's executives still faced criminal charges in Brazil.

It would indeed take some time for SBM to finally end the corruption affair. In 2016 it settled for US$162.8 million, of which 149 million for Petrobras for corruption between 1996 and 2012. In late 2017 SBM settled with the American authorities for US$238 million for bribery in Brazil, Angola, Equatorial Guinea, Kazakhstan and Iraq. In September 2018 SBM reached what would prove to be a final settlement in Brazil, paying 48 million to Petrobras. In October 2019 this settlement was finalized when the last case of the Brazil authorities was retracted for unclear reasons. In 2021, it was also fined in Switzerland for the affair.

== Operations ==
The company was the first to offer an integrated oil and gas production service through the investment in a Floating Production Storage and Offloading (FPSO) unit. The lease and operation of FPSOs has become a large component of the company's activity and SBM Offshore now owns and operates the world's largest fleet. Other activities include design and engineering, turnkey supply, and specialised services such as maintenance and offshore installation. The most recent addition to the product line is midscale LNG (liquefied natural gas) FPSOs for a capacity in the range of 1 and 2 MTPA (Million Tonne Per Annum) with Nitrogen expansion liquefaction technology, developed in collaboration with The Linde Group.

The firm operates from five main execution centres: the global headquarters in Schiedam, Monaco, Kuala Lumpur, Houston, Bengaluru and Brazil. The company employs over 8,000 individuals worldwide.

On 18 August 2009, SBM Offshore announced the signing of a framework agreement with Shell for the supply of turret mooring systems for Shell's floating liquified natural gas (FLNG) project. The deal covers the supply of turret mooring systems for a period of up to 15 years. The 3.5-million-tonne-per-annum FLNG facility will produce liquefied natural gas offshore and will be moored with an internal and permanently connected freely weather-vaning turret mooring system. SBM Offshore said the turret mooring system is expected to be the largest in terms of diameter with capability to handle mooring loads in excess of current systems.

== Group companies ==
- LMC Atlantia Inc., Houston
- LMC Holding Inc. S.A
- SBM Schiedam B.V.
- SBM Malaysia Sdn. Bhd., Kuala Lumpur
- SBM Production Contractors Inc., Monaco
- Single Buoy Moorings Inc., Monaco
- SBM Offshore India., Bengaluru India

In November 2012 SBM sold offshore design company GustoMSC B.V. in Schiedam, the Netherlands, to investment firm Parcom Capital, a subsidiary of ING Group Capital.

=== FPSOs ===
- -Unnamed FAST4WARD FPSO - MPF-10 SWS 6 FPSO (under construction)
- -Unnamed FAST4WARD FPSO - MPF-11 COSCO 1 FPSO (MOU)
- -Unnamed FAST4WARD FPSO - MPF-12 UNKNOWN (MOU)
- Alexandre de Gusmão FPSO
- Almirante Tamandaré FPSO
- Aseng FPSO (sold GE PETROL)
- Brasil FPSO (de-commissioned)
- Capixaba FPSO (de-commissioned)
- Chalchi FSO (under construction)
- Cidade de Anchieta FPSO (former Espadarte FPSO)
- Cidade de Paraty FPSO
- Cidade de Ilhabela FPSO
- Cidade de Maricá FPSO
- Cidade de Paraty FPSO
- Cidade de Saquarema FPSO
- Espírito Santo FPSO
- Falcon FPSO (de-commissioned)
- Frade FPSO (sold Prio)
- GranMorgu FPSO (under construction)
- Jaguar FPSO (under construction)
- Kaminho FPSO (under construction)
- Kikeh FPSO
- Kuito FPSO (de-commissioned)
- Liza Destiny FPSO (sold ExxonMobil)
- Liza Unity FPSO (sold ExxonMobil)
- Longtail FPSO (under construction)
- Marlim Sul FPSO (de-commissioned)
- Mondo FPSO
- N'Goma FPSO (former Xikomba FPSO)
- Okha FPSO (sold Woodside)
- ONE GUYANA FPSO (sold ExxonMobil)
- P-57 FPSO (sold)
- Prosperity FPSO (sold ExxonMobil)
- Rang Dong 1 FPSO (laidup)
- Saxi-Batuque FPSO
- Salamanca FPU DeepDraftSemi, ex Independence Hub (sold)
- Sepetiba FPSO
- Serpentina FPSO (former Eagle FPSO)
- Thunder Hawk FPU DeepDraftSemi (sold)
- Turritella FPSO (sold)

=== Vessels ===
- Deep Water Installation Vessel - Normand Installer
- Diving Support and Construction Vessel - SBM Installer (Sold)
- DSV Dynamic Installer (Sold in 2012)

== See also ==
- Yme field — MOPU STOR
