= Floating production storage and offloading =

Vessel used by offshore oil and gas industry

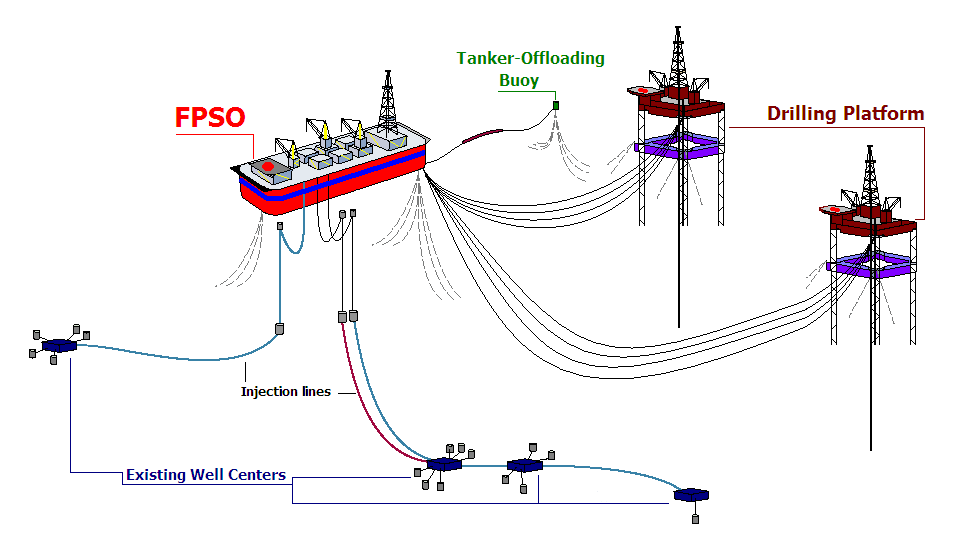
A diagram of floating production storage and an offloading unit

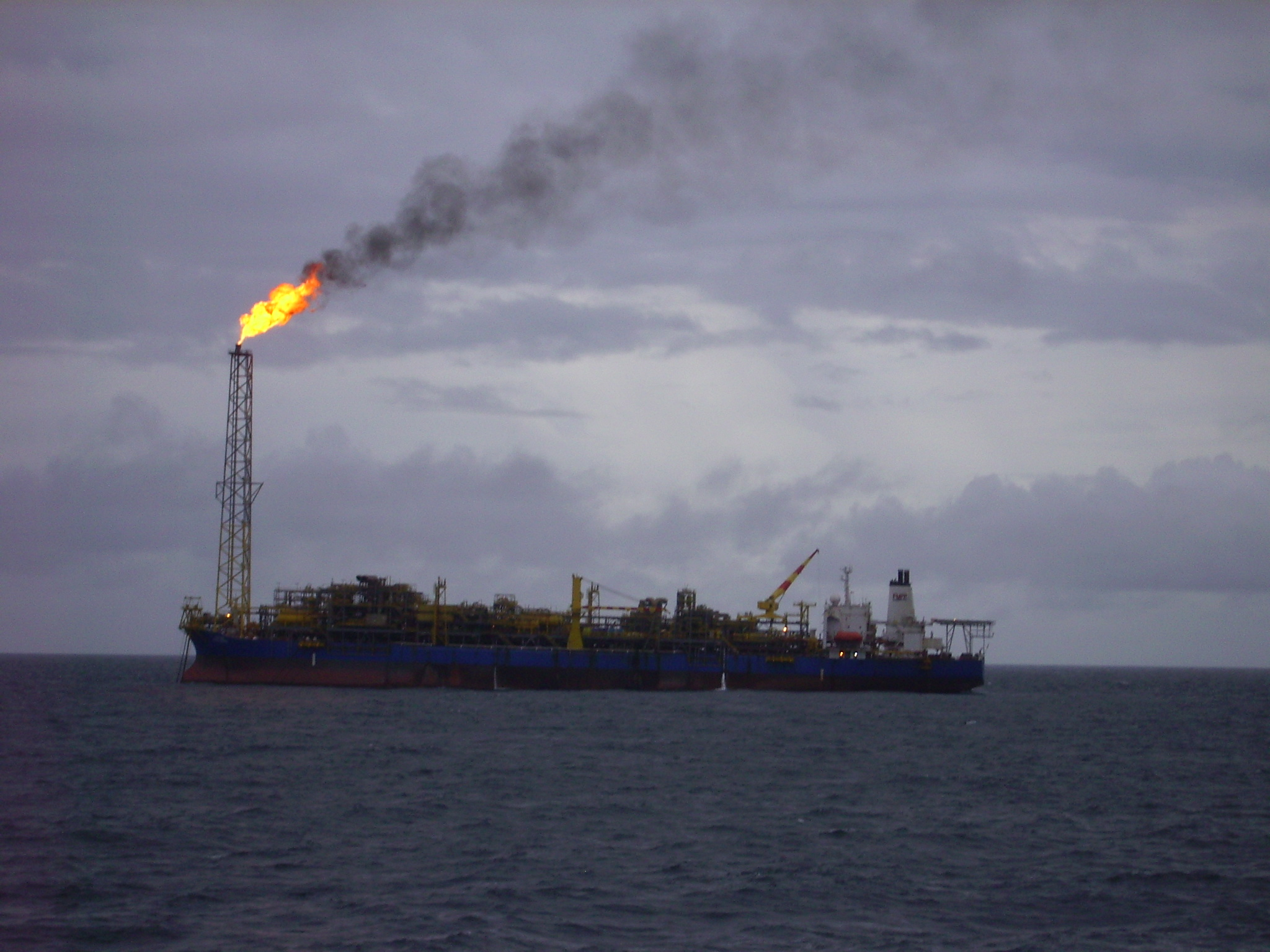
FPSO Mystras at work off the shore of Nigeria

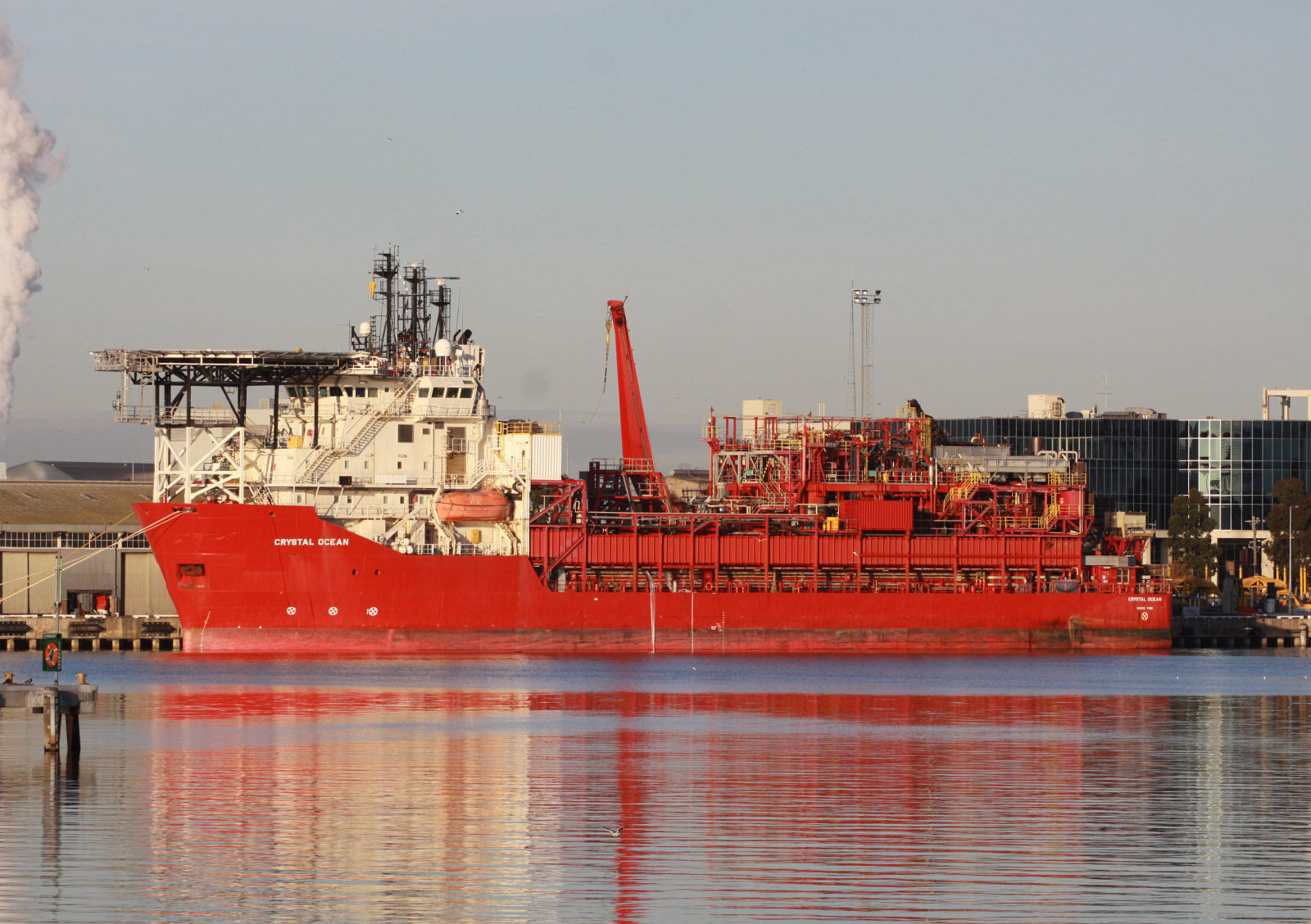
FPSO Crystal Ocean moored at the Port of Melbourne

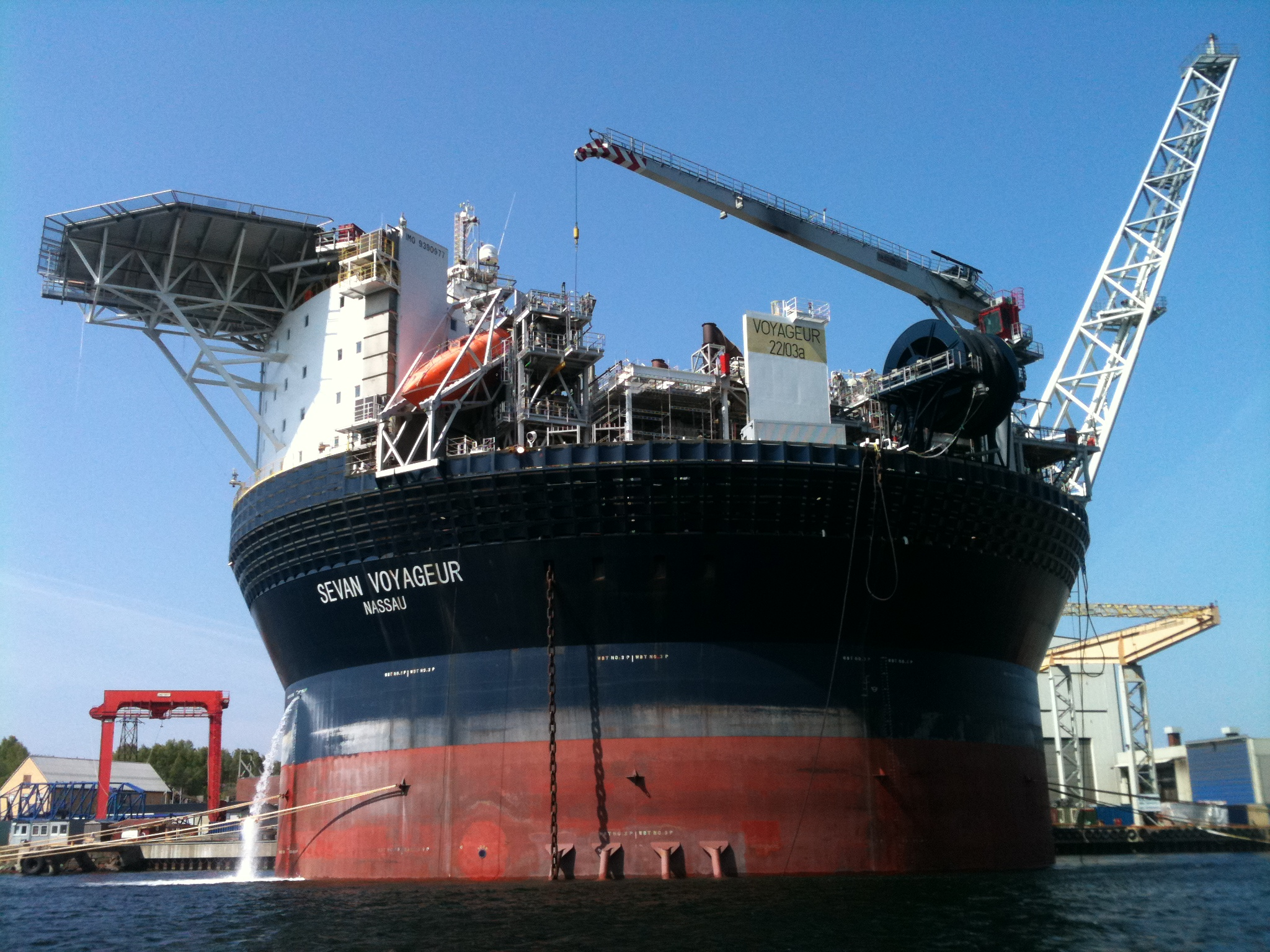
The circular FPSO Sevan Voyageur moored at Nymo yard at Eydehavn, Norway

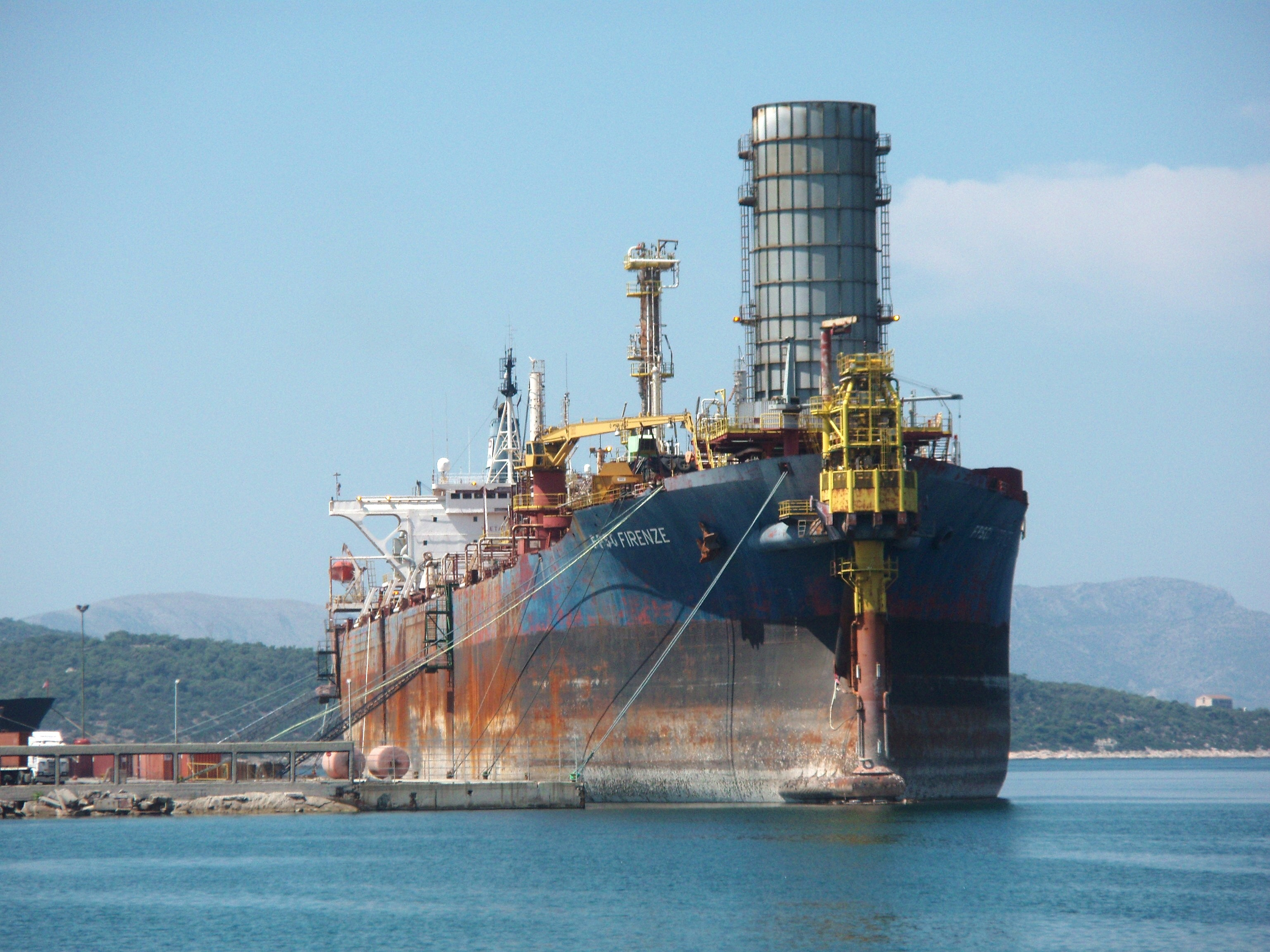
FPSO Firenze moored at Hellenic Shipyards, 2007

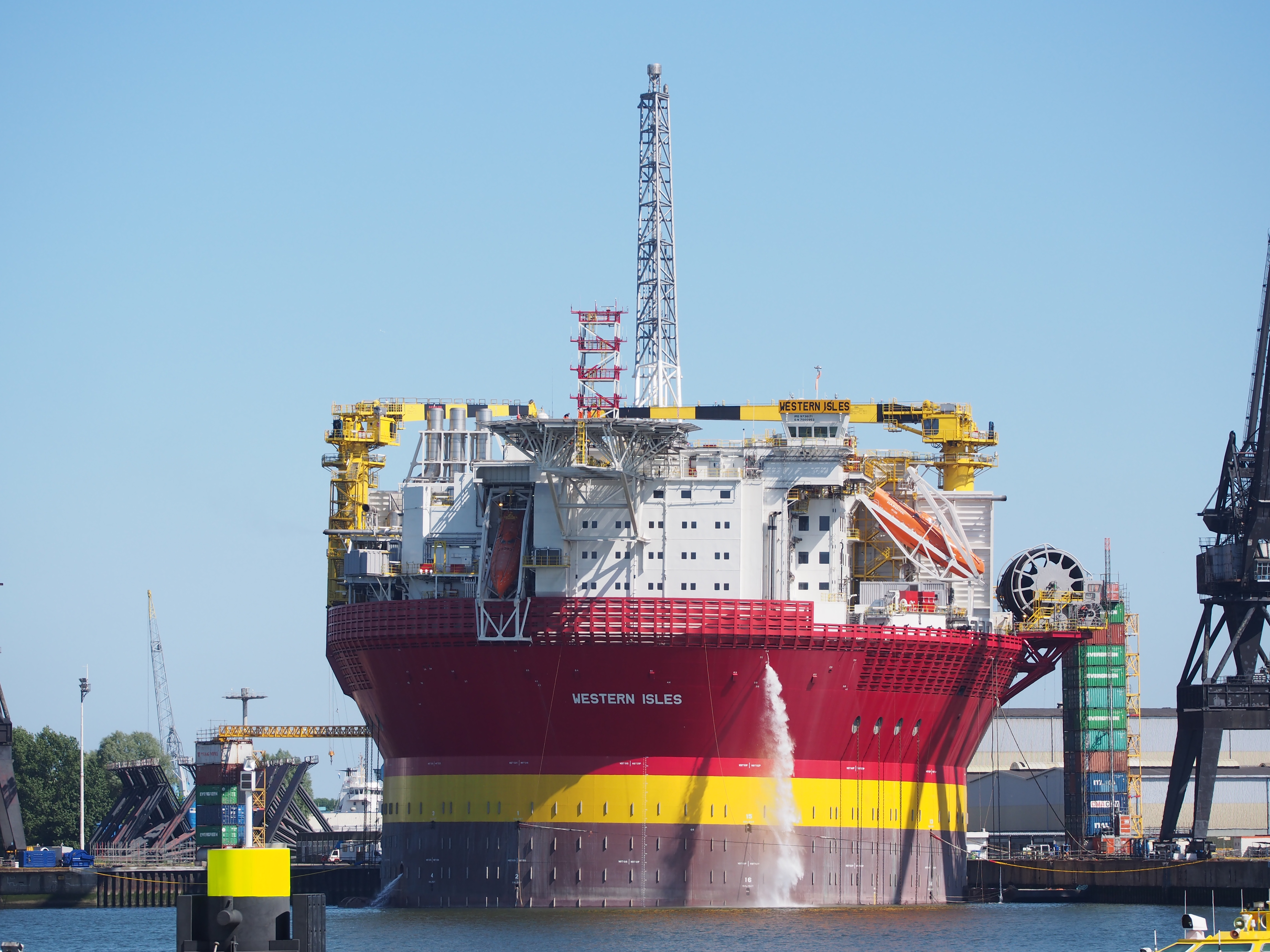
FPSO (Floating, Production, Storage, Offloading), Welplaathaven, Port of Rotterdam

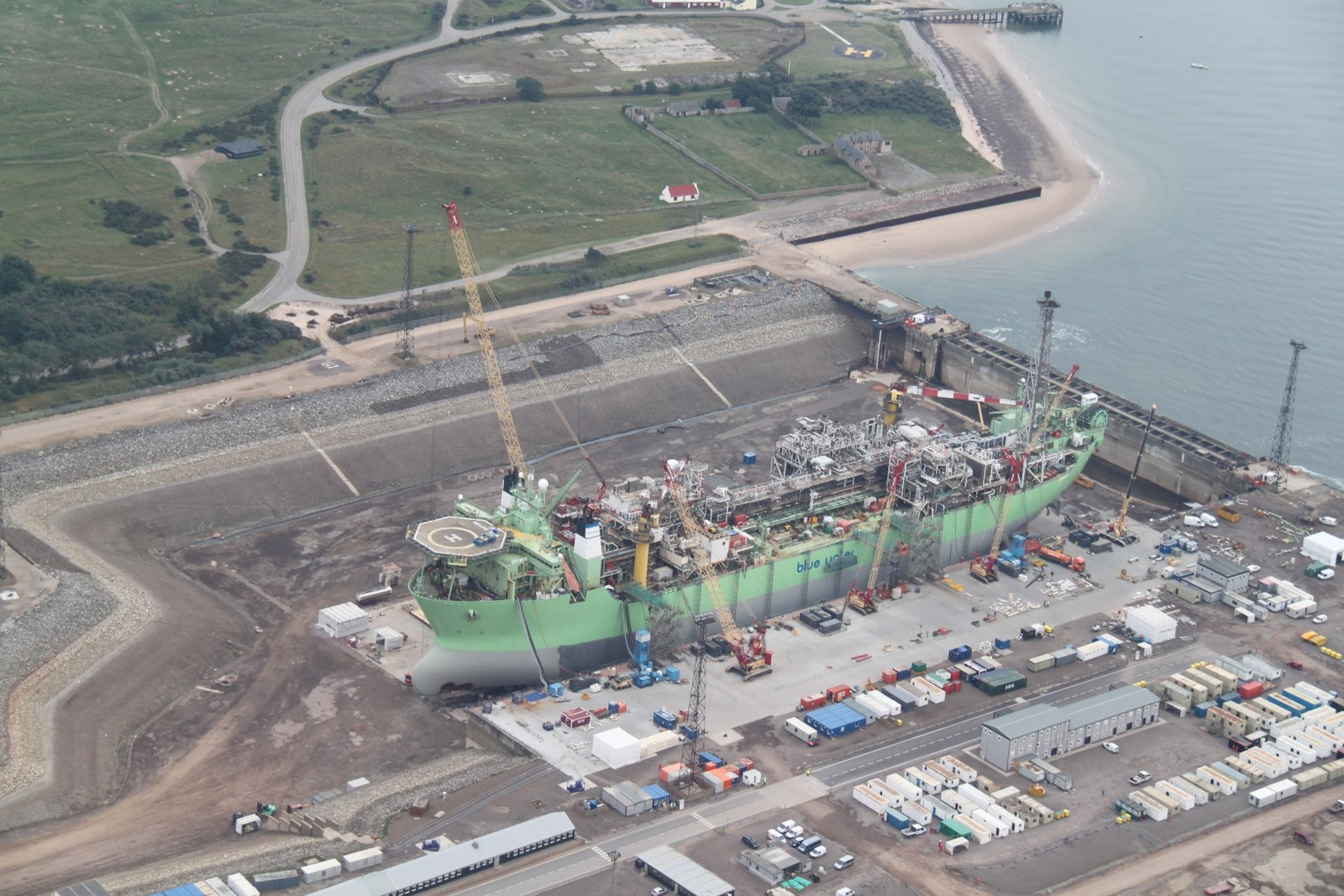
Hæwene Brim FPSO

A floating production storage and offloading (FPSO) unit is a floating vessel used by the offshore oil and gas industry for the production and processing of hydrocarbons, and for the storage of oil. An FPSO vessel is designed to receive hydrocarbons produced by itself or from nearby platforms or subsea template, process them, and store oil until it can be offloaded onto a tanker or, less frequently, transported through a pipeline.

FPSOs are preferred in frontier offshore regions as they are easy to install, and do not require a local pipeline infrastructure to export oil. FPSOs can be a conversion of an oil tanker (like Seawise Giant) or can be a vessel built specially for the application. A vessel used only to store oil, without processing it, is referred to as a floating storage and offloading (FSO) vessel.

The first of a related type, floating liquefied natural gas vessels, went into service in 2016.

== Types ==
FPSOs are classified into the following types.

- Floating storage and offloading (FSO)
- Floating production storage and offloading (FPSO)
- Floating drilling production storage and offloading (FDPSO)
- Floating storage regasification unit (FSRU)

A floating storage and offloading unit (FSO) is essentially an FPSO without the capability for oil or gas processing. Most FSOs are converted single hull supertankers. An example is Knock Nevis, ex Seawise Giant, which for many years was the world's largest ship. It was converted into an FSO for offshore use before being scrapped.

At the other end of the LNG logistics chain, where the natural gas is brought back to ambient temperature and pressure, a specially modified ship may also be used as a floating storage and regasification unit (FSRU). A LNG floating storage and regasification unit receives liquefied natural gas (LNG) from offloading LNG carriers, and the onboard regasification system provides natural gas exported to shore through risers and pipelines. As of 2022, there are 33 FSRUs in the world, of which some relocate to higher-priced areas.

== History ==
Oil has been produced from offshore locations since the late 1940s. Originally, all oil platforms sat on the seabed. In the 1970s, as exploration moved to deeper waters and more distant locations, floating production systems came to be used.

The first oil FPSO was owned by Shell and built by with help of SBM Offshore and Gusto in 1977 on the Shell Castellon field, located in the Spanish Mediterranean. Today, over 270 vessels are deployed worldwide as oil FPSOs.

In July 2009, Shell and Samsung announced an agreement to build up to 10 LNG FPSOs, at the same Samsung Yard. Flex LNG appeared to construct smaller units.

In May 2011, Royal Dutch Shell announced plans for a 488 m long floating liquefied natural gas facility, named Prelude, to be situated approximately 200 km off the coast of Western Australia. The hull was launched in December 2013. At full size, Prelude FLNG became one of the largest floating production structures ever built and displaces around 600,000 tonnes, significantly surpassing previous records.

In June 2012, Petronas made a contract of procurement engineering, construction, installation and commissioning, with the Technip and DSME consortium, for what is expected to be the world's first floating liquefaction unit when completed in 2015. The unit is destined for the Kanowit gas field off Sarawak, Malaysia.

At the opposite (discharge and regasification) end of the LNG chain, the first ever conversion of an LNG carrier, Golar LNG-owned Moss type LNG carrier into an LNG floating storage and regasification unit was carried out in 2007 by Keppel shipyard in Singapore.

== Mechanisms ==
Oil produced from offshore production platforms can be transported to the mainland either by pipeline or by tanker. When a tanker is chosen to transport the oil, it is necessary to accumulate oil in some form of storage tank, such that the oil tanker is not continuously occupied during oil production, and is only needed once sufficient oil has been produced to fill the tanker.

== Advantages ==
Floating production, storage and offloading vessels are particularly effective in remote or deep water locations, where seabed pipelines are not cost-effective. FPSOs eliminate the need to lay expensive long-distance pipelines from the processing facility to an onshore terminal. This can provide an economically attractive solution for smaller oil fields, which can be exhausted in a few years and do not justify the expense of installing a pipeline. Once the field is depleted, the FPSO can be moved to a new location.

New build FPSOs have a high initial cost (up to US$1 billion), but require limited maintenance. In addition, the ability to reposition/repurpose them means they can outlast the life of the production facility by decades. A cheaper alternative for smaller platforms is to convert an oil tanker or similar vessel at a cost below USD100 million.

== Record vessels ==
The FPSO operating in the deepest waters is the FPSO BW Pioneer, built and operated by BW Offshore on behalf of Petrobras Americas INC. The FPSO is moored at a depth of 2,600 m in Block 249 Walker Ridge in the US Gulf of Mexico and is rated for 80,000 bbl/d (13,000 m^{3}/d). The EPCI contract was awarded in October 2007 and production started in early 2012. The FPSO conversion was carried out at MMHE Shipyard Pasir Gudang in Malaysia, while the topsides were fabricated in modules at various international vendor locations. The FPSO has a disconnectable turret (APL) The vessel can disconnect in advance of hurricanes and reconnect with minimal down time. A contract for an FPSO to operate in even deeper waters (2,900 m) for Shell's Stones field in the US Gulf of Mexico was awarded to SBM Offshore in July 2013.

One of the world's largest FPSO is the Kizomba A, with a storage capacity of 2.2 million barrels (350,000 m^{3}). Built at a cost of over US$ 800 million by Hyundai Heavy Industries in Ulsan, Korea, it is operated by Esso Exploration Angola (ExxonMobil). Located in 1200 meters (3,940 ft) of water at Deep water block 200 statute miles (320 km) offshore from Angola, Central Africa in the Atlantic Ocean, it weighs 81,000 tonnes and is 285 meters long, 63 meters wide, and 32 meters high (935 ft by 207 ft by 105 ft).

The first FSO in the Gulf of Mexico, The FSO Ta'Kuntah, has been in operation since August 1998. The FSO, owned and operated by MODEC, is under a service agreement with PEMEX Exploration and Production. The vessel was installed as part of the Cantarell Field Development. The field is located in the Bay of Campeche, off Mexico's Yucatán peninsula. It is a converted ULCC tanker with a SOFEC external turret mooring system, two flexible risers connected in a lazy-S configuration between the turret and a pipeline end manifold (PLEM) on the seabed, and an offloading system that allows up to two tankers at a time to moor and load, in tandem or side by side. The FSO is designed to handle 800,000 bbl/d (130,000 m^{3}/d) with no allowance for downtime.

The Skarv FPSO, developed and engineered by Aker Solutions for BP Norge, is one of the most advanced and largest FPSO deployed in the Norwegian Sea, mid Norway. Skarv is a gas condensate and oil field development. The development ties in five sub-sea templates, and the FPSO has the capacity to include several smaller wells nearby in the future. The process plant on the vessel can handle about 19,000,000 cubic metres per day (670,000,000 cu ft/d) of gas and 13,500 cubic metres per day (480,000 cu ft/d) of oil. An 80 km gas export pipe ties into Åsgard transport system. Aker Solutions (formerly Aker Kvaerner) developed the front-end design for the floating production facility as well as the overall system design for the field and preparation for procurement and project management of the total field development. The hull is an Aker Solutions proprietary "Tentech975" design. BP also selected Aker Solutions to perform the detail engineering, procurement and construction management assistance (EPcma) for the Skarv field development. The EPcma contract covers detail engineering and procurement work for the FPSO topsides as well as construction management assistance to BP including hull and topside facilities. The production started in field in August 2011. BP awarded the contract for fabrication of the Skarv FPSO hull to Samsung Heavy Industries in South Korea and the Turret contract to SBM. The FPSO has a length of 292m, beam of 50.6m and is 29m deep, and accommodates about 100 people in single cabins. The hull was delivered in January 2010.

The floating liquefied natural gas facility Prelude FLNG holds a size record among non‑self‑propelled floating vessels. At 488 m in length with a fully loaded displacement of approximately 600,000 tonnes, it is the longest and largest FLNG facility ever constructed.
