= Floating liquefied natural gas =

Offshore gas recovery facility

A floating liquefied natural gas (FLNG) facility is a floating production storage and offloading unit that conducts liquefied natural gas (LNG) operations for developing offshore natural gas resources. Floating above an offshore natural gas field, the FLNG facility produces liquefied stores and transfers LNG (and potentially LPG and condensate) at sea before carriers ship it to markets.

Recent developments in the liquefied natural gas (LNG) industry require relocation of conventional LNG processing units (or trains) into the sea to unlock remote, smaller gas fields that would not be economical to develop otherwise. Using these new types of FLNG facilities reduces capital expenses and subsequently environmental impacts of construction.

The first 3 FLNG's were constructed in 2016: Prelude FLNG (Shell), PFLNG1 and PFLNG2 (Petronas). Since additional projects have been opened in other geographies, including a substantial number of projects in Africa, where large capital projects for offshore LNG were thought challenging because of crime and construction complexity. A 2025 report from ISS African Futures said that 56% (10.2 million metric tons per annum) of global FLNG capacity operating from 2023 to 2027 was in Africa.

== History ==
Studies into offshore LNG production have been conducted since the early 1970s, but it was only in the mid-1990s that significant research backed by experimental development began.

In 1997, Mobil developed an FLNG production concept based on a large, square structure 540 by 540 feet (160 m × 160 m) with a moonpool in the center, commonly known as "The Doughnut". The Mobil proposal was sized to produce 6,000,000 tonnes (6,600,000 tons) LNG per year produced from 7,400,000 cubic metres (260,000,000 cu ft) per year of feed gas, with storage provided on the structure for 250,000 cubic metres (66,000,000 US gal) of LNG and 103,000 cubic metres (27,000,000 US gal) of condensate.

In 1999, a major study was commissioned as a joint project by Chevron Corporation and several other oil and gas companies. This was closely followed by the so-called 'Azure' research project, conducted by the EU and several oil and gas companies. Both projects contributed to steel and concrete hull design, a new development with LNG transfer systems.

== Projects ==
=== Royal Dutch Shell ===
In July 2009, Royal Dutch Shell, or just Shell, signed an agreement with Technip and Samsung allowing for the design, construction and installation of multiple Shell FLNG facilities.

Royal Dutch Shell announced a 12 billion AUD (8.71 billion USD) investment on 20 May 2011 to build Prelude FLNG. Construction began in October 2012. Prelude became the world's first FLNG facility, anchored 200 kilometres (120 mi) off the shore of Western Australia.

In April 2010, Shell announced that it had been selected to develop the Greater Sunrise gas fields in the Timor Sea, making it Shell's second FLNG facility after Prelude. The project was scheduled to begin processing gas in 2016.

=== Petronas ===
In February 2011, Petronas awarded a FEED contract for an FLNG unit to a consortium of Technip and Daewoo Shipbuilding & Marine Engineering for a facility in Malaysia. It installed its first FLNG, PFLNG Satu, in the Kanowit gas field off the shore of Sarawak, Malaysia. It loaded its first cargo was onto the 150,200-cbm Seri Camellia LNG carrier on 3 April 2017.

== Planned projects ==
Petrobras invited three consortiums to submit proposals for engineering, procurement and construction contracts for FLNG plants in the ultra-deep Santos Basin waters during 2009. A final investment decision was expected in 2011.

As of November 2010, Japan's Inpex planned to use FLNGs to develop the Abadi gas field in the Masela block of the Timor Sea, with a final investment decision expected by the end of 2013. Late in 2010, Inpex deferred start-up by two years to 2018 and reduce its "first phase" capacity to 2.5 million tons per year (from a previously proposed capacity of 4.5 million tonnes).

As of November 2010, Chevron Corporation was considering an FLNG facility to develop offshore discoveries in the Exmouth Plateau of Western Australia, while in 2011, ExxonMobil was waiting for an appropriate project to launch its FLNG development.

According to a presentation given by their engineers at GASTECH 2011, ConocoPhillips aimed to implement a facility by 2016–19, and had completed the quantitative risk analysis of a design that would undergo pre-FEED study during the remainder of 2011.

GDF Suez Bonaparte – a joint venture undertaken by the Australian oil and gas exploration company Santos (40%) and the French multi-international energy company GDF Suez (60%) – initially awarded a pre-FEED contract for the Bonaparte FLNG project offshore Northern Australia. The first phase of the project calls for a floating LNG production facility with a capacity of 2 million mt/year, with a final investment decision is expected in 2014 and startup planned for 2018. However, in June 2014, GDF Suez and Santos Limited made a decision to halt development. A part of the decision included the perception that long-term capabilities of North American gas fields due to hydraulic fracturing technologies and increasing Russian export capabilities would adversely affect the profitability of the venture due to competition.

In October 2016, Exmar NV performance tested a facility designed by Black & Veatch. The facility has a single liquefaction train that can produce 72 million cubic feet a day of LNG.

On 4 June 2018, Golar LNG announced that their FLNG Hilli Episeyo had got a customer acceptance after successfully being tested in 16 days commissioning. FLNG Hilli Episeyo will serve Parenco Cameroon SA in Cameroon's water. FLNG Hilli Episeyo is designed by Black & Veatch and was built in Keppel Shipyard in Singapore.

Fortuna FLNG, to be commissioned in 2020, is owned by a joint venture between Ophir Energy and Golar LNG is under development in Equatorial Guinea. When operational, it is expected to produce around 2.2 million tonnes per year of gas and to be the first FLNG to operate in Africa.

== Challenges ==
Moving LNG production to an offshore setting presents several challenges. In terms of the design and construction of the FLNG facility, every element of a conventional LNG facility needs to fit into an area roughly one quarter the size, whilst maintaining appropriate levels of safety and giving increased flexibility to LNG production.

Once a facility is in operation, ocean waves will present another challenge. LNG containment systems need to be capable of withstanding the damage that can occur when the sea's wave and current motions cause sloshing in the partly filled tanks. Product transfers also need to deal with the effects of winds, waves and currents in the open seas.

Solutions to reduce the effect of motion and weather are addressed in the design, which must be capable of withstanding – and even reducing – the impact of waves. In this area, technological development has been mainly evolutionary rather than revolutionary, leveraging and adapting technologies that are currently applied to offshore oil production or onshore liquefaction. For example, traditional LNG loading arms have been adapted to enable LNG transfers in open water, and hose-based solutions for both side-by-side transfers in calmer seas and tandem transfers in rougher conditions are nearing fruition.

=== Environmental impacts ===
While less destructive than built drilling platforms and on-land liquification projects, severe weather or oceanic conditions can cause leaks, breaches and wear and tear on the equipment.

One study of floating systems in the Pagasetic Gulf near greece found that local ecosystems were still heavily effected by " increased underwater activity, thermal discharge, accidental fuel leakage, reduced water quality, and disturbance of sensitive breeding and feeding zones".

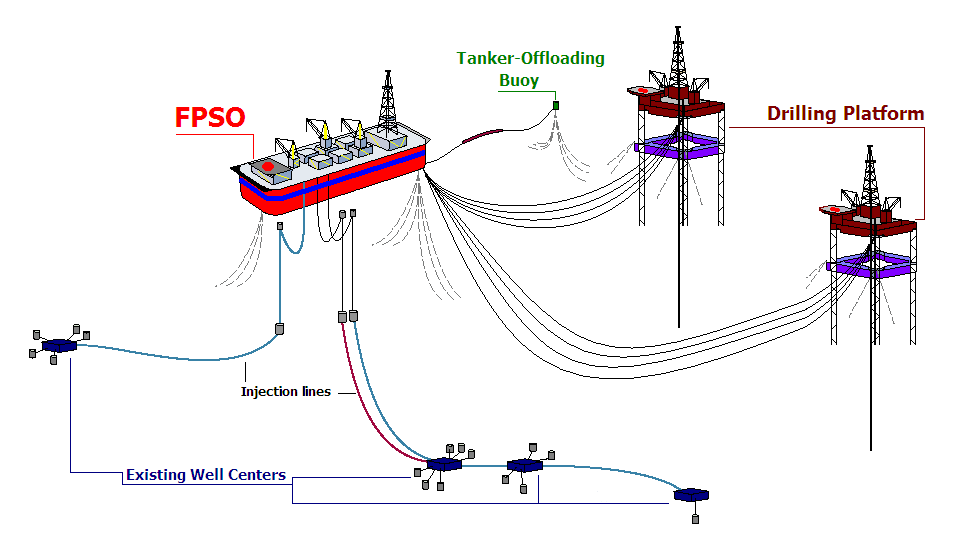
FLNG or FPSO diagram

== Operation ==
The FLNG facility will be moored directly above the natural gas field, where it will route gas from the field to the facility via risers. Upon reaching the facility, the gas will undergo processing to produce natural gas, LPG, and natural gas condensate. The processed feed gas will be treated to remove impurities and then liquefied through freezing before being stored in the hull of the vessel. Ocean-going carriers will then offload the liquefied natural gas, as well as other liquid by-products, for delivery to markets worldwide.
