= Rijn-Schelde-Verolme =

Dutch shipbuilding company

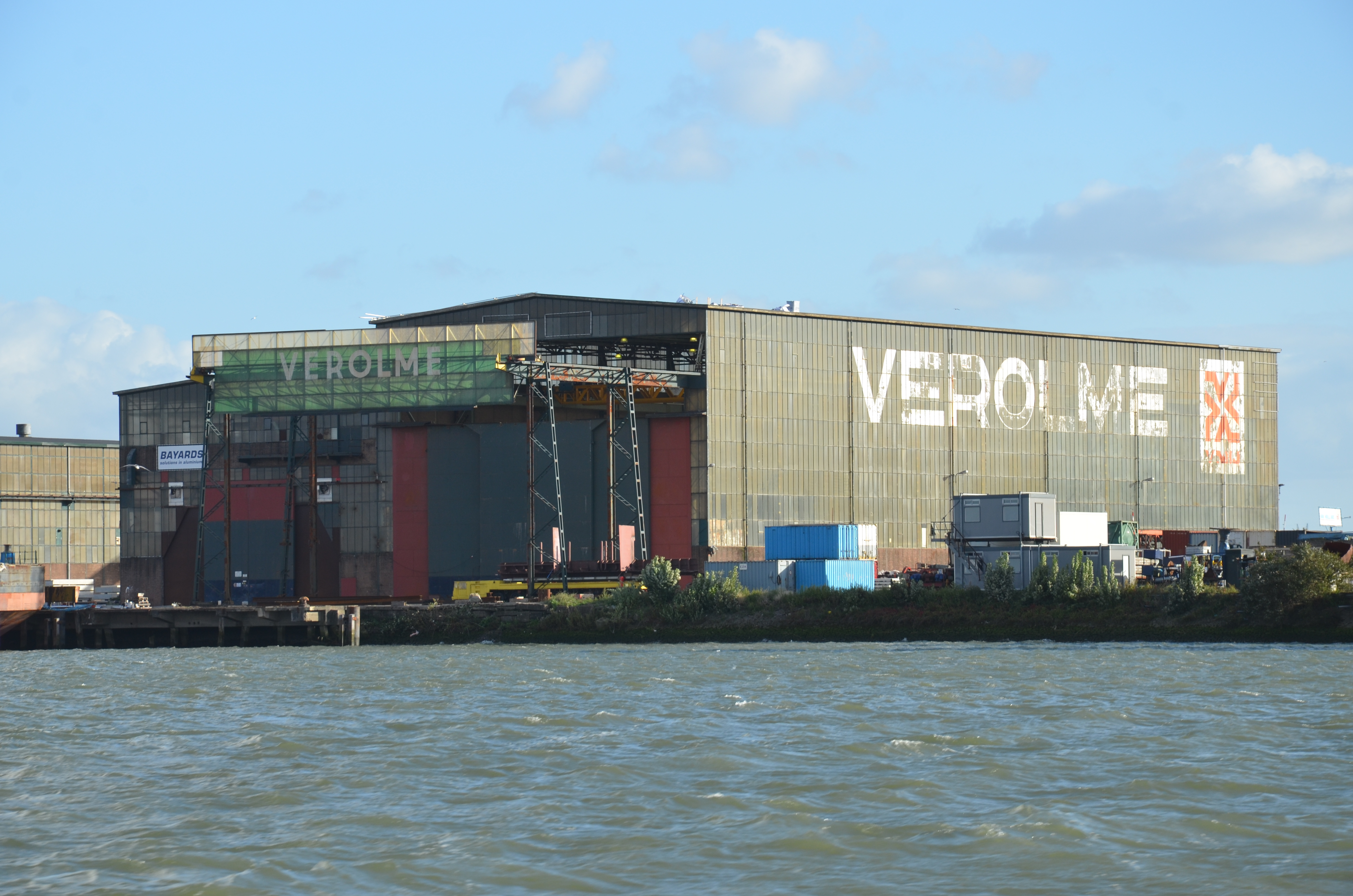
- Building on the Oostdijk in Rotterdam, in use by Verolme® Special Equipment B.V.
- Industry: Shipbuilding, machinebuilding
- Founded: 15 April 1971 (by merger)
- Defunct: 19 February 1983
- Headquarters: Rotterdam, Amsterdam Vlissingen etc. the Netherlands

The shipbuilding company Rijn-Schelde-Verolme Machinefabrieken en Scheepswerven NV (RSV) was a combination of shipbuilding companies and machine factories founded in 1971. In 1983, the company went broke with a staggering loss of public money. It led to the Parliamentary inquiry about RSV.

== Foundation ==
=== Context ===
After World War II, the Dutch shipbuilding industry quickly recovered. Until the mid 1950s, there was a lot of work, and the industry made good profits. In 1958, it was the fifth of the world in tonnage and employed 56,000 people. Nevertheless, the Dutch shipbuilders had a structural problem. In general, they had missed out on the revolution in shipbuilding which had taken place in the United States during World War II and resulted in the Liberty ship. It involved building ships in sections and series and replacing most riveting with electric welding.

Building in sections was first done in the Netherlands by Cornelis Verolme. In about 1960, the other shipyards followed. Building in sections becomes more effective when it is done by building a series of ships according to the same design, i.e. building in series. This was done by De Schelde, and by Verolme. When this is done on a larger scale, it becomes even more effective, because of the economies of scale.

Profiting from economies of scale can also be done by creating larger companies. In 1929 Wilton's Dok- en Werf Maatschappij and Fijenoord had merged to become Wilton-Fijenoord. In 1946, Nederlandsche Scheepsbouw Maatschappij (NSM) and Nederlandsche Dok Maatschappij (NDM) merged to become Nederlandsche Dok en Scheepsbouw Maatschappij (NDSM). The alternative way to profit from economies of scale is to increase cooperation. Before 1965, IHC Holland was a partnership of 6 medium sized shipyards. This partnership would sell e.g. dredging vessels, and then, the partners would each build the part in which they excelled, reducing the price of the individual parts. Outsourcing part of the construction to suppliers is another alternative. The lack of scale, and the lack of cooperation was a serious problem in the Dutch shipbuilding industry. Unlike the situation in Japan, where all parties concerned (shipping lines, government, classification agencies, suppliers, education) cooperated, Dutch shipbuilding and its modernization remained a fragmented operation.

=== Predecessor Rijn-Schelde Machine Factories and Shipyards ===
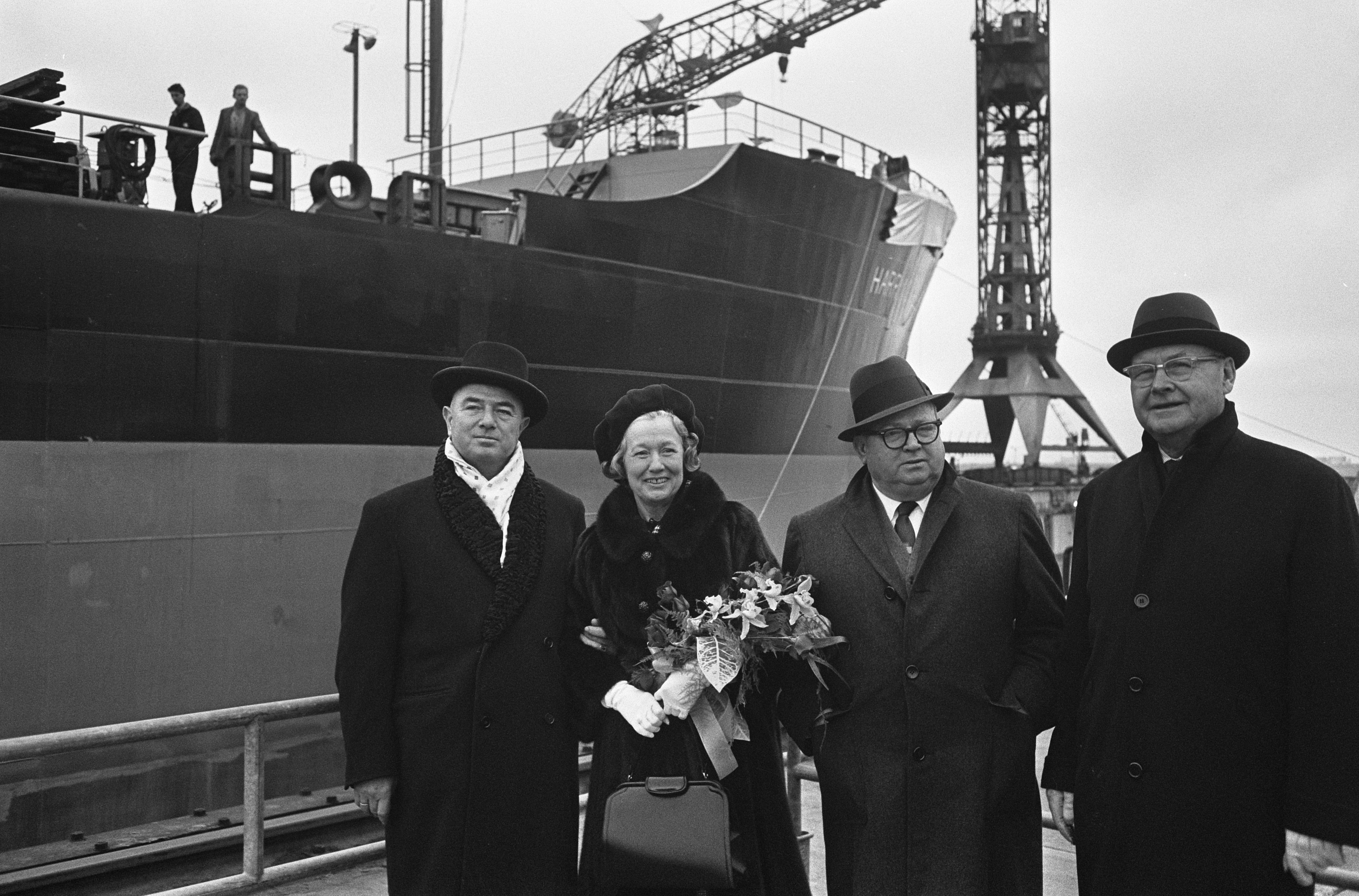
Cornelis Verolme (left) in 1965

In 1966 Rijn-Schelde Machinefabrieken en Scheepswerven NV was formed by Rotterdamsche Droogdok Maatschappij and daughter P. Smit Jr. (4,148 employees), De Schelde (3,487 employees), and Motorenfabriek Thomassen in De Steeg (848 employees). The reasons were the need for bigger production units to take on bigger shipping projects, diversification to sectors like oil and nuclear energy, and the need to increase efficiency. At the time of the merger, the companies still had enough work for the next year.

=== Predecessor Verolme Verenigde Scheepswerven ===
Verolme Verenigde Scheepswerven had been formed in 1955. It consisted of a machine factory in IJsselmonde, two shipyards in Heusden and Alblasserdam, and Verolme Dok en Scheepsbouw Maatschappij (VDSM) founded by Cornelis Verolme in 1957. The latter was a very modern shipyard. It used the idea of boosting productivity by building in sections and series, and focused on supertankers, which became a new market after the 1956 closure of the Suez Canal.

== History before foundation ==
=== Increasing wages ===
In the 1960s, wages all over the Western world started to increase sharply. In 1966 Amsterdamsche Droogdok Maatschappij (ADM) claimed that the labor cost, including all taxes and social security costs, had doubled from 1960 to 1965. Reason enough for ADM to halt shipbuilding and to focus on ship repair. On a national economic level, numbers for 1960-1965 indicate that the real cost of labor increased by 40% in this period. In the shipbuilding industry, with its strong unions, and in Amsterdam, this might very well have been much higher than 40%. Still, increases in wages or labor costs do not pose a problem, as long at they are matched by increases in productivity. In general, the Dutch shipyards remarked that this was by far not the case in the 1960s.

=== Commission Keyzer ===
By the mid-1960s, it was clear that the Dutch shipbuilding industry was in serious trouble. While most shipyards still existed, they had not been able to profit from the industry international growth since it hit its lowest mark in 1962. Right-wing politicians noted the high labor cost in the Netherlands, and the low wages in Japan, which built about 25% of the new ships worldwide. The leftist side noted that the productivity per hour was 0.0136 brt in Sweden, as opposed to 0.0049 brt in the Netherlands, and even worse in the United Kingdom, but did not mention the number for Japan. By December 1965, the Netherlands had dropped to the 11th place in the list of shipbuilding nations. Even Poland was building more ships than the Dutch.

Worldwide many countries were supporting their shipbuilding industry in some way. Japan had a great research program and invested heavily. It also had the advantage of its shipyards being part of great conglomerates. Total Japanese support was estimated to amount to 10%. In West Germany, there was a tax return, and in Italy a subsidy of 15%. In Sweden, there were very favorable tax conditions for depreciating fixed assets, which had been of great help while modernizing its shipyards. In the United Kingdom, the government had helped with loans, and long-term export credits. The Dutch government thought such measures would not help in the long run without increased cooperation between the Dutch shipyards and speedy rationalization of their production methods through an extensive research program. To achieve this, the Commissie Scheepsbouw 1965 (shipbuilding Commission 1965) was appointed, later known as Commission Keyzer.

In its 1966 report, the Commission Keyzer noted three major causes of the crisis in the Dutch shipbuilding industry. Keyzer personally noted these as: 1) The almost universal support for foreign shipyards by their governments with financing work; 2) The labor shortage in the Netherlands combined with low productivity; 3) The retardation of the Dutch shipbuilders in switching to an industrial approach of their trade. In detail, the commission proposed to start with three groups of companies. One group would build a series of ships of 50,000 to 200,000 tons. The second group would build a series of tankers, bulk carriers, and freighters smaller than 50,000 tons. The third group would build custom-designed ships. Each group would have 5,000-6,000 employees, and there would be a repair and diversification group. Whatever the exact organization, the commission stressed the need to build in series.

=== Five years till the merger ===
The government message was clear. Before the report was published, Rijn-Schelde Machine Factories and Shipyards had been formed. In November 1967, NV Machinefabriek Breda voorheen Backer & Rueb agreed to join the conglomerate. Later in November 1967, it bought Machine Factory Braat in Amsterdam.

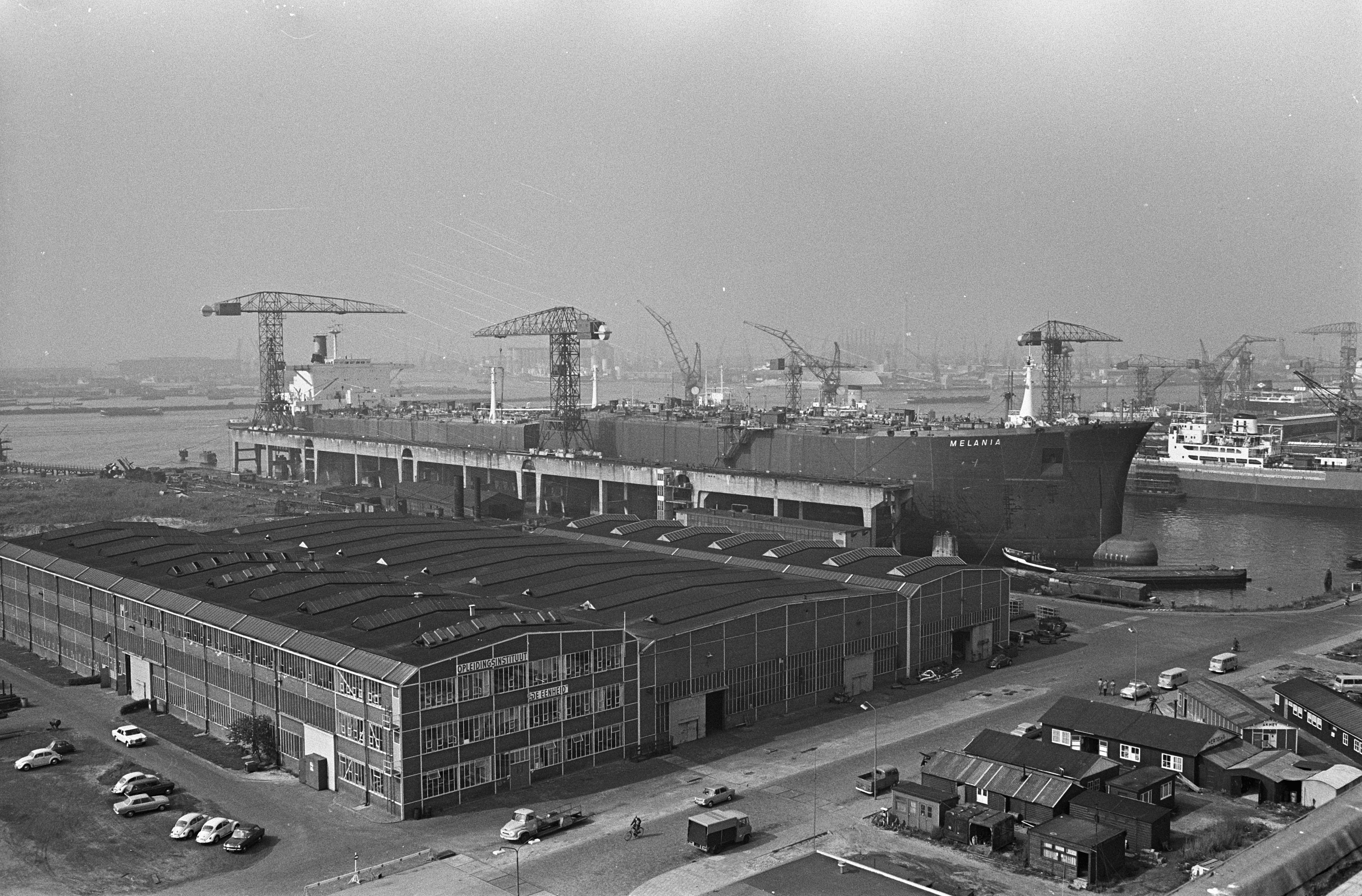
Melania in parts

The next two groups made plans to build a mammoetdok (mammoth dry dock) for supertankers near Rotterdam. One group consisted of Verolme Verenigde Scheepswerven and wanted a combined building and repair dry dock. The other group consisted of Rijn-Schelde, Wilton-Fijenoord, and NDSM. It wanted a dock for repairs only because it did not build supertankers. In line with the Keyzer Commission, the government was prepared to favorably finance the construction of the mammoth dock, but it did not want to end up with two dry docks. In late June 1968, it became known that Verolme would take over the troubled NDSM. Indeed, the government had pressured to Verolme to do this, and the reward was the support for Verolme's construction dock for supertankers. Rijn-Schelde and Wilton-Fijenoord then announced that they would also merge. Soon after, the deal between Verolme and the government became public: a guarantee of 75 million guilders for the takeover, and preservation of employment at, NDSM by Verolme.

NDSM would soon prove to be in a far worse condition than was first thought. In September 1969 the construction of the supertankers Melania and Dagmaer Maersk alone was estimated to have led to a loss of 20 million guilders. More supertankers were planned and were expected to lead to further losses. In late January 1970, the state guaranteed 50 million in loans to Verolme, both Mr. Verolme and Rijn-Schelde then agreed to follow the advice of the Commission Winsemius, which planned the future of the major Dutch shipyards. In October 1970, the loss of Verolme (incl. NDSM) was estimated as: 70 million in 1968 and 31 million in 1969. By then a merger between RSV-Schelde and Verolme was thought to be imminent.

== History of RSV ==
=== The merger becomes final ===
In early 1971, Cornelis Verolme tried to stop the merger with Rijn-Schelde, but because he had agreed to follow the advice of the Winsemius Commission and had given his shares as a guarantee for the government guarantees, he had no real power to stop the process. In mid-April 1971, the commission then advised/decided on a merger between Verolme and Rijn-Schelde on 1 January 1971. In 1971, the conglomerate had 30,000 employees, orders for 17 supertankers, 2 passenger ships, and almost 30 containerships. The only RSV shipyards that built supertankers, were Verolme's in Rozenburg, and NDSM in Amsterdam. These were the parts/shipyards which would form RSV:

- Nederlandsche Dok en Scheepsbouw Maatschappij (NDSM) in Amsterdam
- Wilton-Fijenoord in Rotterdam
- Rotterdamsche Droogdok Maatschappij (RDM) in Rotterdam
- P. Smit Jr. shipyard in Rotterdam (part of RDM)
- Nieuwe Waterweg shipyard (part of RDM)
- Verolme Dok en Scheepsbouw Maatschappij NV (VDSM) in Rozenburg, Rotterdam
- Verolme Scheepswerf Alblasserdam in Alblasserdam
- Verolme Scheepswerf Heusden in Heusden
- De Schelde in Vlissingen
- Verolme Cork Dockyard Co. Ltd. in Cobh, Ireland
- Verolme Estaleiros Reunidos do Brasil in Jacuecanga, Brazil
- Motorenfabriek Thomassen NV in De Steeg
- Machinefabriek Breda voorheen Backer & Rueb NV in Breda
- Verolme Elektra NV in Maassluis

=== The first years ===
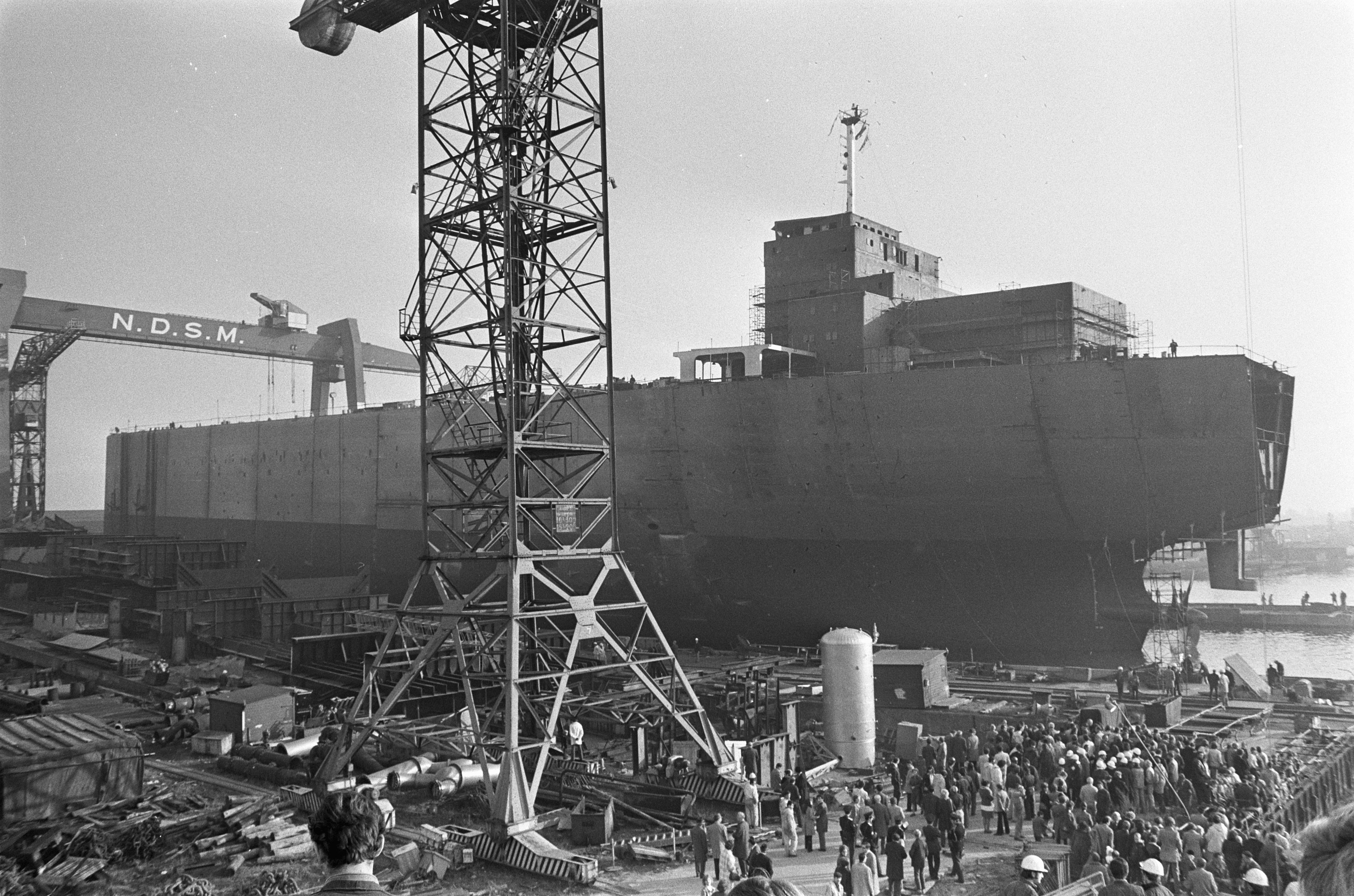
Texaco Amsterdam just before launch at NDSM

Over 1970, the Rijn-Schelde part of RSV made a profit of 13.1 million guilders. The shipbuilding business had a solid demand for supertankers. However, when the supertanker Rudolph Paterson was launched for Chevron Shipping on 5 October 1971, the president of Chevron Shipping spoke some ominous words. He said that as long as prices did not go down, it would be the last Chevron ship built in the Netherlands because the Mitsubishi shipyard was much cheaper. On 30 October 1971, the stern section of the 225,000 ton Texaco Amsterdam was launched at NDSM. It would be followed by the bow section on 31 December 1971.

Over 1971, the profit of RSV was 25.6 million, almost double that of Rijn-Schelde alone in 1970. Contrary to this positive news, the supply of orders diminished. Over 1972, the number of orders received diminished from 4 billion to 3.3 billion guilders. The amount of dock days diminished from 8,552 to 5,145. Wages paid increased from 596 to 695 million (16.6%), while the number of employees increased from 27,754 to 28,839, mainly due to an acquisition. Investments decreased from 63.3 to 57.7 million. Profit increased to 31 million.

1973 seemed to become a turning point for the better. Up till 15 May 1973, orders of 1 billion guilders came in. In the end, open orders rose from 3.4 to 3.65 billion, the number of employees diminished from 28,850 to 28,300, and profit rose to 42.4 million. The big problems during 1973 were in the division of the machine factories.

=== First reorganization plans ===
In 1972, there was a report that advised to close the shipyards P. Smit Jr. in Rotterdam (1,300 employees), Verolme Alblasserdam (700 employees), and Verolme Heusden (700 employees). These were thought to be too scattered and too far inland. During 1973 and early 1974, another reorganization plan was made; it centered on reforming the machine factories of Wilton-Fijenooord and RDM.

=== The 1973 oil crisis ===
The Oil Crisis which started in October 1973, would lead to a major downturn in the western economies. In the shipbuilding market, the demand for new tankers evaporated. Over 1974, this did not yet affect results, which were still positive, and led to a profit of 65 million. On 1 March 1975, RSV Rozenburg launched the 313,000 ton supertanker Lepton as the 24th built by an RSV shipyard. By then RSV had become more productive in building these kinds of ships. However, on account of the launch, RSV announced that it did not expect any more orders for supertankers to come in the coming years. Consequently, it would reorganize its shipbuilding division, focusing on smaller ships, special ships, and offshore equipment. Meanwhile, a supertanker at NDSM for the American Koch Industries was cancelled, although with an indemnification.

Now the lack of a well-filled orderbook led to huge problems. There was a choice between taking a big loss by a sudden closure of the production line or building ships which would probably not be sold at a decent price. In the end, two supertankers were laid down despite their not being a final order. One could be cancelled and replaced by another ship. The other would be finished. RSV then had to sell two supertankers at a loss. Three bulk carriers at Alblasserdam were also built for RSV's account. The two supertankers cost 300 million, and the three bulk carriers 150 million. The three bulk carriers that would be delivered by Alblasserdam on 28 November 1975, 30 May and 30 December 1976, were finally sold for 160 million guilders in October 1975, but this was to a shipping line in which RSV participated. Over 1975, profits were 50.3 million guilders.

On 21 February 1976, a 318,000 tanker was launched in Rozenburg. The next, and last Dutch supertanker was laid down shortly after. At the end of 1975, there had been one supertanker laid up in Norwegian Fjord, two others were expected to join her in 1976 and 1977. Of a total cost of 440 million, 193 million guilders were set apart to cover losses.

=== Commission II, for restructuring the construction of medium sized ships (1972-1976) ===
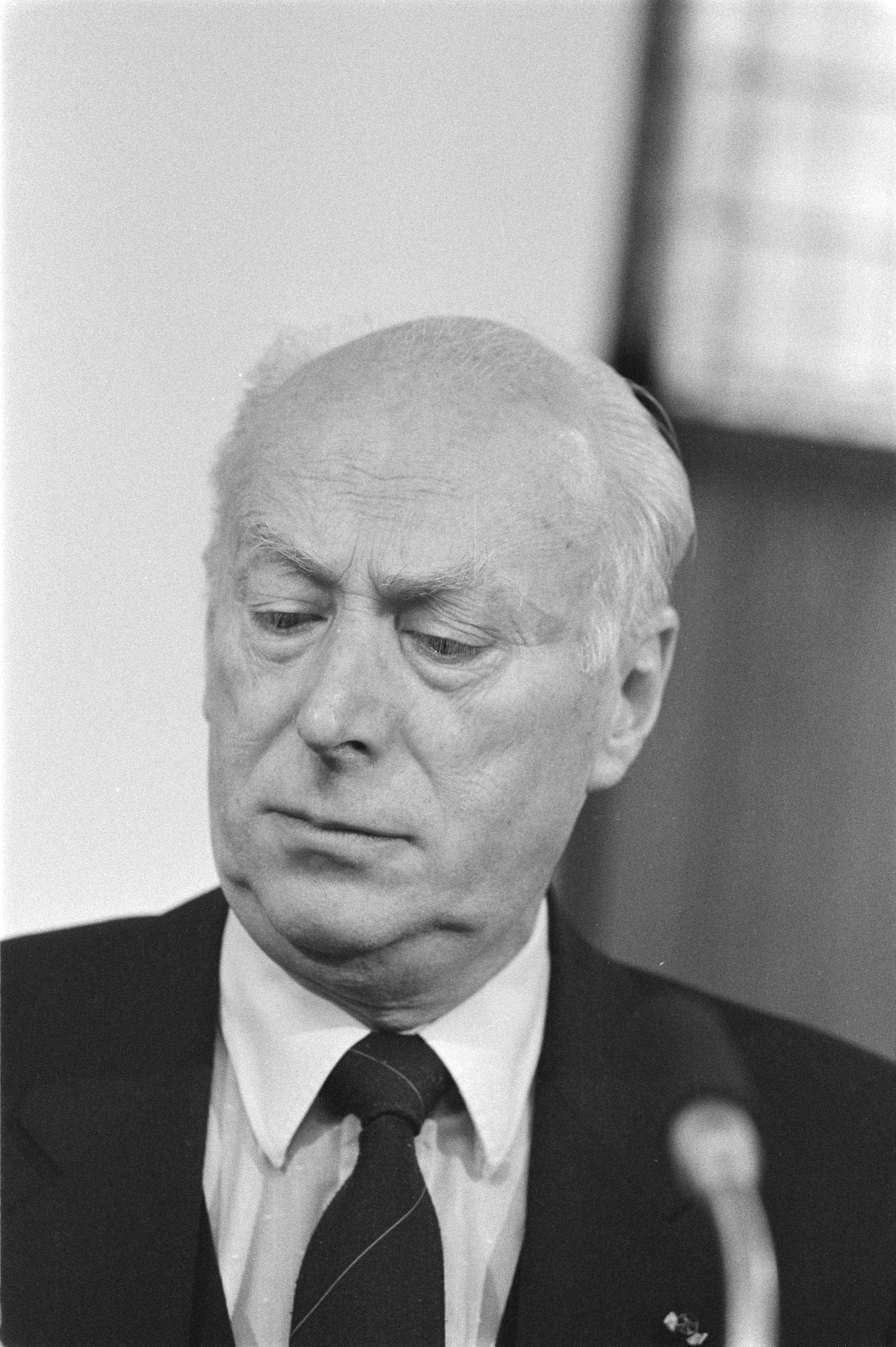
J.A. Bakker in 1984

In April 1972 the Commission II, or Commission Bakker had been appointed. In it, the government, the labor unions, RSV, and Van der Giessen-de Noord Shipyard would plan the future of medium-sized shipbuilding in the western part of the Netherlands. At the start, RSV was willing to hand over the former Verolme shipyards in Heusden and Alblasserdam to Van der Giessen-de Noord. After the Oil Crisis, RSV changed its mind and wanted to take over Van der Giessen-de Noord, which did not like the idea. Then an alternative plan was to make a new combination of the former Verolme shipyards and the Van der Giessen shipyards in Krimpen aan de IJssel and Alblasserdam. This failed too.

The final solution proposed by the commission was a compromise. A new company would be founded, consisting of the Van der Giessen shipyards in Krimpen aan de IJssel and Alblasserdam (1,800 employees), and the former Verolme shipyard in Alblasserdam (600 employees). The shipyard in Heusden would remain with RSV. Van der Giessen-de Noord would have a 55% share, RSV 23%, and the state 22%. On the board, RSV and Van der Giessen would each have two members, and the CEO of RSV would be its 5th member and non-voting president. In case the four votes would not reach a majority in a dispute, and the supervisory boards could not help, the board would settle it in court(!). In return for cooperating with the commission, a 200 million investment program would be made available.

The new company would have a preference for orders for medium-sized ships. In November 1976 this was the reason for RSV not to sign the agreement. In April 1977 Verolme Alblasserdam then launched its last ship. The shipyard Verolme Alblasserdam was acquired by Van der Giessen-de Noord but only built some sections afterwards. In 2000 the terrain of the shipyard was sold to build houses on it.

=== Crisis in shipbuilding in Amsterdam ===
By the end of 1975, the government and the labor unions were critical of the RSV management. RSV had become a single structured company, but that was about all that the management had achieved. It had failed to restructure its employee base and had failed to modernize its production methods. As long as the supertankers were generating enough profit, the risks at RSV had not been addressed. Furthermore, RSV had tried to diversify in nuclear energy, while it was clear that the Dutch population was against nuclear power. When the Dutch shipbuilder's association asked for support in mid-1975, the government demanded that it make a plan to restructure the industry. The labor unions also wanted to have national supervision over RSV. They noted that it was making products that it previously bought from suppliers and was even entering their markets (which was also totally against the rationalization of the industry), and feared that without supervision, RSV might try to solve its problems by starting to compete with the smaller Dutch shipyards. It all led to the appointment of the Beleidscommissie Scheepsbouw (Policy Commission Shipbuilding).

After many months of bickering the new Policy Commission Shipbuilding was finally appointed on 23 June 1976. In mid-1976 RSV thought to reduce the number of employees at NDSM from 1,500 to 1,000 in 1978. This would be achieved without firing employees. Meanwhile, the repair shipyard ADM had already reduced its number of employees from 1,880 to 1,650 in 1975. At NDSM, the last ship under construction was to be launched in mid-1977, but RSV stated that it thought that new orders would come in before that date. The shareholders gave signals about their trust in RSV. In June 1976, the share price of RSV had dropped to 113 guilders, over 50% lower than a year before. In November 1976, RSV stock had dropped to 55 guilders for a nominal value of 100 guilders. It was a sure sign of deep trouble.

In early December 1976, some outlines of the new restructuring plan of the Policy Commission Shipbuilding became clear. In the first year, the government need to spend 435 million to compensate for losses. In 5 years, 1.25 billion would be needed for modernization. 4 billion would be needed for a social plan to prevent employees from getting fired, e.g. by early retirement, retraining, etc. On 16 December 1976, the commission agreed on the number of employees that would have to be reduced, and that nobody would be fired against his will. By December 1976, the 28,000 employees of RSV were facing a government plan for a 30% capacity reduction in the national shipbuilding industry. It was expected to lead to a loss of 4,000 jobs at RSV. On 20 January 1977, the final plan of the commission was presented to the government. It envisioned the loss of 4,500 employees in the next 18 months. Meanwhile, the government should subsidize 75% of losses on new orders in the coming year, for up to 300 million a year. Half of these subsidies would be subordinated to debt. The commission would judge every application for a subsidy on aspects like investments, cooperation, social policy etc. before submitting it to the government. This way the commission could force shipbuilders to follow its plan.

=== RSV starts to reorganize ===
In 1977, the bubble burst. RSV has failed to modernize and rationalize since 1971. Government, RSV, and labor unions had fruitlessly negotiated since mid-1975. In April 1977, the board of RSV then sent a letter to the unions about shutting down almost all of P. Smit Jr.'s shipyard, and the shipbuilding part of RDM, for a total of 1,800 jobs. There were also job cuts in other parts of RSV. Furthermore, the machine factories of Fijenoord and RDM would be merged. Given the 34-million-guilder loss over 1976, there was no dividend. At about the same time RSV was negotiating for a subordinated loan of 150-200 million to cover shipbuilding losses. In June 1977, a plan submitted to the Policy Commission Shipbuilding focused on concentrating shipbuilding in Rozenburg, and at NDSM. NDSM would have to be reduced by 500 men, but if the market situation did not improve, it might have to be shut down completely. The plan that was next approved by the commission also included the closure of IHC Holland's Gusto Shipyard of 1,200 men. The plan was thought to be a complete solution for the builders of large ships. In parallel with these closures, a 350-million-guilder modernization plan was designed. E.g. much work on the shipyards was still done in the open air and would be brought indoors.

Meanwhile, the RSV board thought about NDSM. Just closing down NDSM would make sense but was politically explosive. NDSM represented the whole tradition of the Amsterdam Shipbuilding industry. The shipyard also has a strong labor union presence, and the city itself was leaning to the extreme left of the political spectrum. In August 1977, the Policy Commission Shipbuilding sent Roelof Nelissen, AMRO Bank board member and former government minister for the KVP to investigate 'closer cooperation' between Amsterdam shipyards. The Communists were the first to openly suspect that RSV wanted to achieve the liquidation of its shipbuilding activities in Amsterdam covertly by first organizing a merger with ADM and possibly Verschure shipyard. Over 1977, the loss of RSV was about 50 million.

=== The reorganization starts (1978) ===
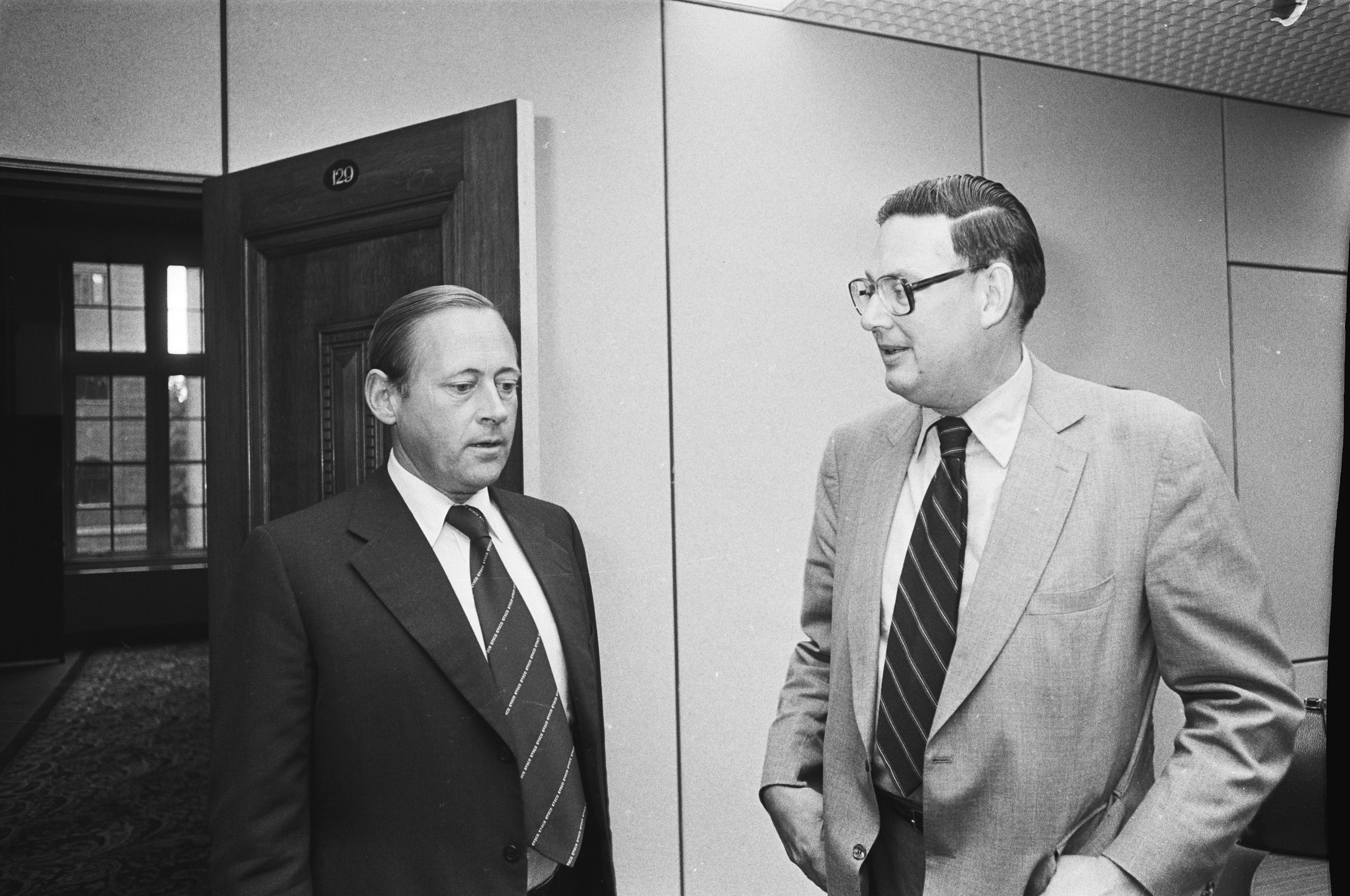
Ir. Stikker and Van Aardenne discuss NDSM in Sep. 1978

In March 1978, the government launched a support plan for the heavy industry. In shipbuilding, RSV would get 390 million, IHC 323 million, and Van der Giessen-de Noord 50 million. The state would become a 40% shareholder in RSV. There was one nasty condition for government support: RSV would have to close either VDSM in Rozenburg or NDSM. In September 1978, there was an agreement on a merger between NDSM and ADM. The new company would retain some small shipbuilding activities. This new company would go bankrupt in early 1985.

RSV then made plans for a further reorganization of its activities. The repair shipyards Nieuwe Waterweg Shipyard and Waalhaven Shipyard (150 employees) would have to be closed. The heavy machinery division (former Rotterdam Nuclear) would be halved. Meanwhile, the employees of the IHC shipyard Gusto in Schiedam, which had to be closed down according to the plan approved by the commission, became employees of RSV. Reason for this strange move was that RSV needed the engineering office of Gusto to be effective in its market. The operation to find new jobs for 2,200 employees of RSV then started in the summer of July 1978.

In 1978, the government then went against its policy by ordering the first Walrus-class submarine at RDM. It meant that shipbuilding continued at RDM.

=== The end of big shipbuilding at RSV ===
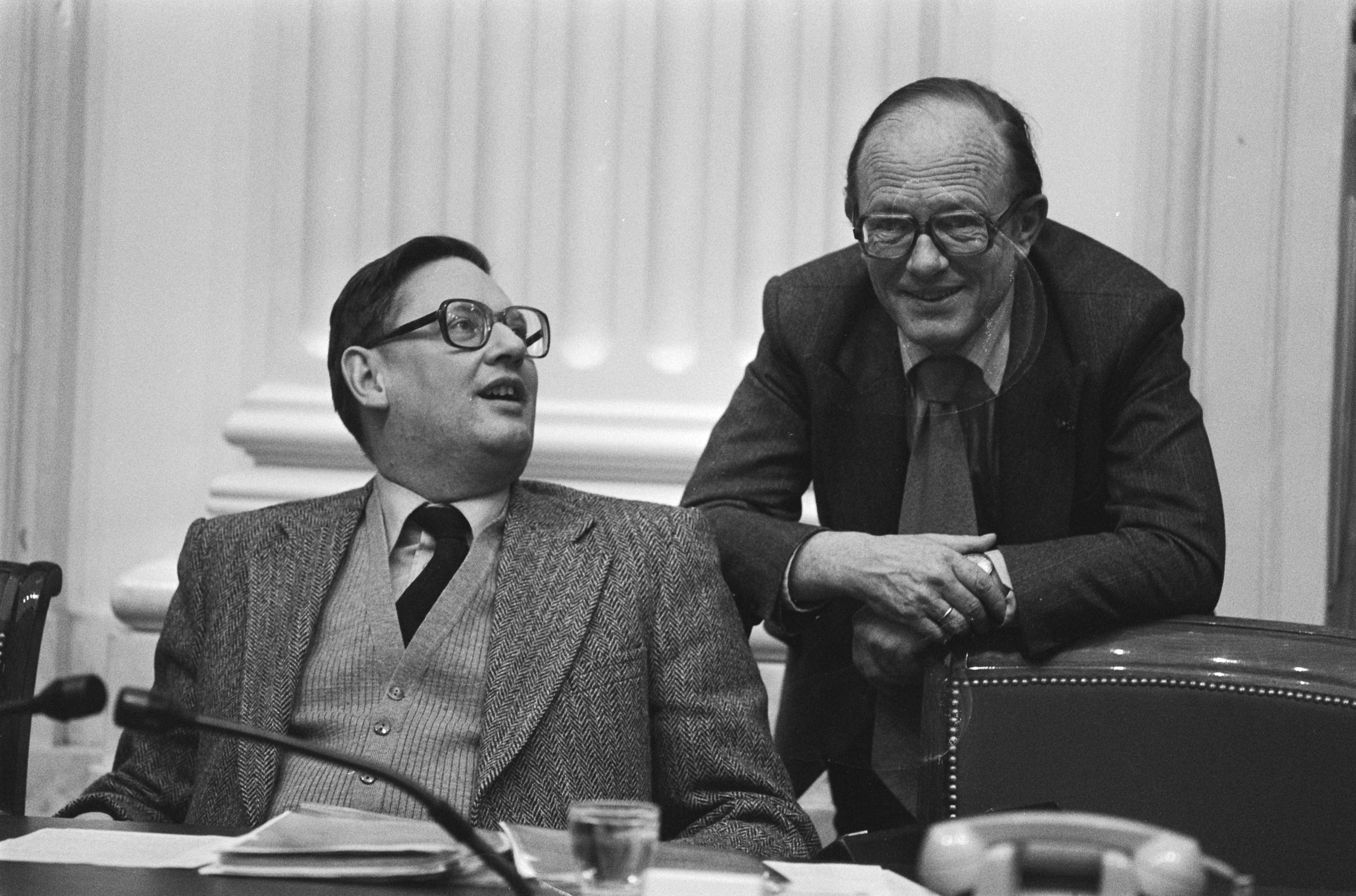
Minister of economic Affairs Van Aardenne during a March 1979 debate about shipbuilding

By early 1979, it was clear that the restructuring of RSV was not going very well. Of the 2,250 employees who had to be reorganized, 1,000 had found a new job. RSV had been given permission to fire 400 people of over 57.5 years, which were thought to be too old for a new job. The government then gave a subordinated loan of 100 million, 'invested' another 80 million in RSV shares via the National Investment Bank, and gave 160 million in special support over the years 1978-1981. In April 1979, the results over 1978 became clear. The official earnings before interest and taxes were a loss of 78 million. The real loss was 213 million, including 30 million from the government for the loss in shipping activities, 60 million by selling houses that RSV owned, and 124 million in reorganization costs.

In all these years only a very few orders had come in for VDSM Rozenburg. By February 1979, it had only an oil platform for Petrobaltic and a 'walking dredge platform' for Stevin under construction. Financing shipbuilding below cost price was one thing. Paying for a shipyard that had no orders was something different. On 30 March 1979, the government postponed a decision to support VDSM. The labor unions then occupied the shipyard in Rozenburg. They demanded support from the government, and removal of the RSV management, which they deemed incompetent. A report by Bureau Berenschot about the management and very low productivity at VDSM supported this opinion. In the House of Representatives Minister of Economic Affairs Gijs van Aardenne then also stated that the management of RSV had to be reorganized. In late 1979 there would be another proof of the chaos at RSV. A 35-million-guilder order for a floating oil tank for Shell was given to RSV with a government guarantee to cover losses. In the end, RSV had to subcontract smaller companies like Hollandia Kloos, Grootint, Gusto Slikkerveer and Van Koten en Verbeek to do about 20% of the work.

=== The ROS Project, end of merchant shipbuilding at RSV (1978-1979) ===
In late June 1979, the government decided to found Rotterdam Offshore en Scheepsbouw (ROS) a new combination of the shipbuilding activities of VDSM shipbuilding, RDM Offshore, Verenigde Machinefabrieken IJsselmonde (VMIJ) Scheepsmontage, Gusto Engineering, and Marcon Engineering office. It would get about 250 million guilders in support. By mid-November 1979 ROS had a supervisory board and was looking for an executive board. ROS would become a state-owned company. There would be work for about 1,600 of the 2,800 employees that the preceding companies had. The founding of ROS would be on 1 January 1980. Ir. G.F. van der Want of Batavus Bicycles would become the new CEO of ROS. When it was time for ROS to start, and the boards wanted to see the administration, it became clear that of the 250 million, about 100 million had already disappeared in RSV. The supervisory board of ROS then flatly refused to start the company without getting this 100 million back. The House of Representatives refused this 100 million, and so the ROS project came to an end.

=== Towards the end ===
After shipbuilding had been terminated, the situation at RSV seemed to improve in 1980. Verolme Botlek (ship repair at the VDSM location), and Verolme Brazil were profitable. RDM/Wilton-Fijenoord had some trouble, but the overall result of RSV would have been good if Thomassen had not suffered a catastrophic loss of 150 million on projects in Algeria. Meanwhile, RSV had started a project to produce bucket-wheel excavators Kolengraafmachines Over 1981 there was again a loss of 80 million for the projects in Algeria. The part that RSV had in two supertankers (see above) was depreciated by 30 million. There were also losses on the Dredge Island Simon Stevin and there were some rumors about the bucket-wheel excavators. Nevertheless, the government picked up the tab.

In June 1982, the RSV Board announced that it expected that RSV would be profitable again over 1982. By September 1982 there was talk about selling RSV's interest in the American coal mining operation. Still a month later, ir. Stikker announced that he would step down as CEO of RSV.

On 9 February 1983, the court of Rotterdam granted an automatic stay to RSV. At the same time, it became that losses on the bucket-wheel excavators amounted to about 1 billion instead of 400 million.

== Aftermath ==
=== Parliamentary Inquiry RSV ===
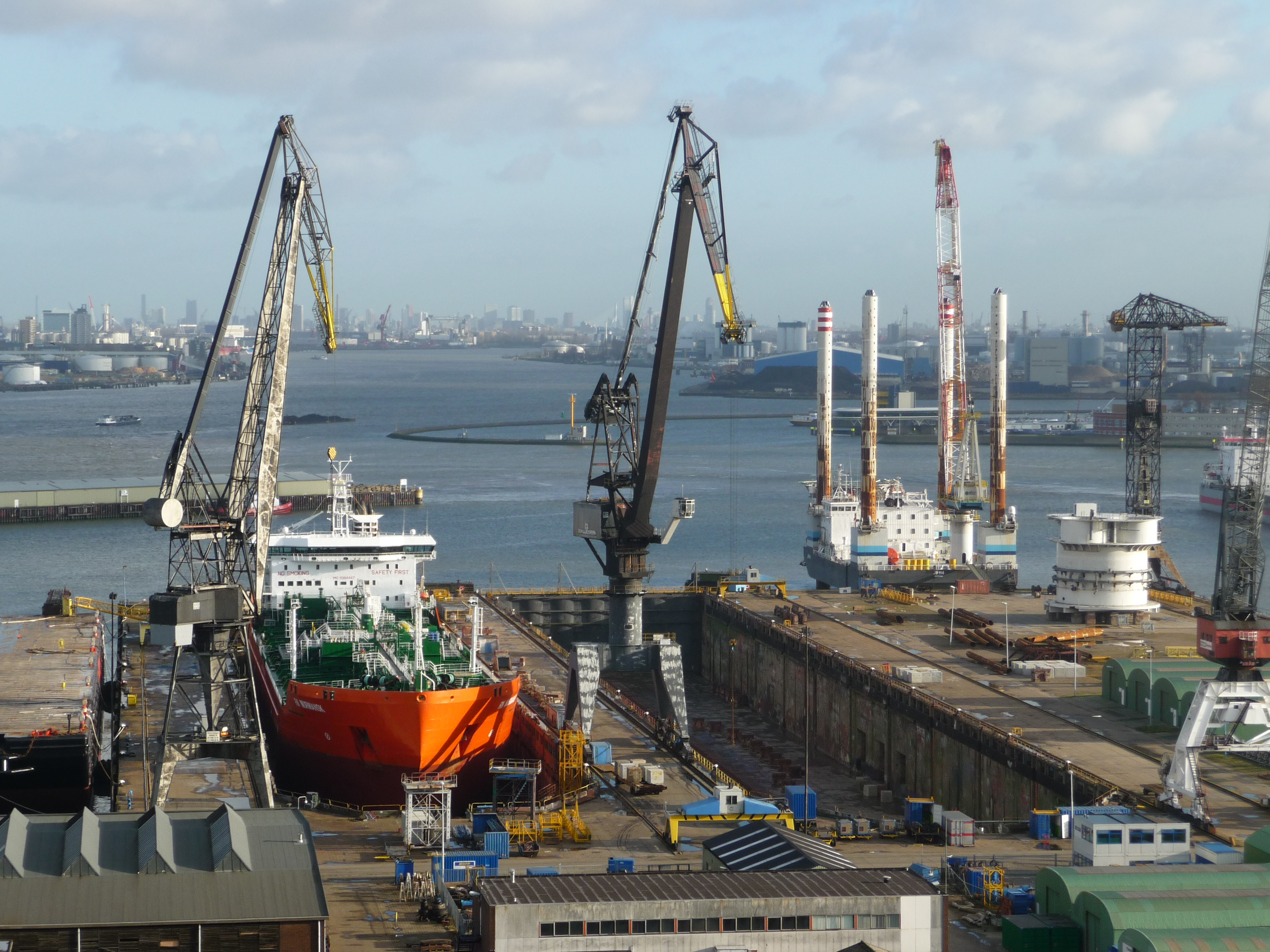
Dock 5 and 6 at Keppel Verolme in 2011

Almost immediately after the automatic stay at RSV multiple parties in the House of Representatives wanted to hold a Parliamentary Inquiry. This was a special tool that the house had not used since 1887, except to investigate the role of the government in World War II. A Parliamentary Inquiry allowed the house to summon witnesses, and to hear them under oath. The Ondernemingsraad (workers council) of Verolme Botlek (which had not become ROS) was the first to call for this inquiry. The Parliamentary Inquiry RSV lasted for 1.5 years and was probably the most famous political affair in the Netherlands after World War II.

=== Successor companies ===
De Schelde would survive the liquidation and still exist as Damen Schelde Naval Shipbuilding. RDM survived as the state-owned RDM Nederland BV, which was sold in 1991, and ended its activities a few years later. Wilton-Fijenoord would survive the dissolution, and have some good years till it was closed in 1998. VDSM Rozenburg survived as repair company Verolme Botlek BV, became Keppel Verolme in 2002, and became Damen Verolme Rotterdam in 2017.
