= Oil fields operated by BP =

This is a list of oil and gas fields operated by BP.

== United Kingdom ==
All fields in British territory are operated as part of the BP's North Sea Strategic Performance Unit from their office in Dyce, Aberdeen. This includes some fields not strictly in the North Sea itself. Fields in the Norwegian sector are operated from Stavanger.

=== Onshore ===
- Wytch Farm in Dorset (transferred to Perenco ownership 2011)

=== Southern North Sea ===
- Amethyst gas field (transferred to Perenco ownership, being decommissioned 2021)
- Cleeton gas field (transferred to Perenco ownership 2012)
- Ravenspurn gas fields (transferred to Perenco ownership 2012)
- West sole gas field (transferred to Perenco ownership 2012)

=== Central North Sea ===
- Andrew oilfield
- Cyrus oilfield
- ETAP complex
  - Marnock
  - Mungo
  - Monan
  - Machar
  - Mirren
  - Madoes
- Erskine gas field (transferred to Ithaca Energy ownership)
- Everest gasfield (transferred to BG Group ownership 2006, transferred to Chrysaor ownership)
- Harding oilfield (transferred to TAQA ownership 2012)
- Lomond gas field (transferred to BG Group ownership 2009, transferred to Chrysaor ownership 2017)
- Miller oilfield (ceased production 2007, decommissioned 2018)

=== Northern North Sea ===
- Bruce oil field (transferred to Serica Energy ownership)
- Magnus oilfield (transferred EnQuest ownership 2018)

=== West of Shetland ===
- Clair oilfield
- Foinaven oilfield (ceased production 2021)
- Schiehallion oilfield

== Norway ==
- Hod oilfield
- Tambar oilfield
- Ula oil field
- Valhall oil field
- Skarv oil field

== Trinidad and Tobago ==
All fields of the Trinidad and Tobago business unit are operated from the BPTT office in Port of Spain.

- Mango gasfield

== Gulf of Mexico Deepwater ==
The Gulf of Mexico business unit is operated from Houston, Texas.

- Atlantis Oil Field
- Mad Dog oil field
- Macondo Prospect site of the April 20, 2010, Deepwater Horizon explosion and oil spill
- Nakika
- Thunder Horse Oil Field
- Tiber Oil Field (announced 2009; production not commenced)

== Alaska ==
The BP office for the Alaska business unit was located in Anchorage.

- Prudhoe Bay Oil Field transferred to Hilcorp ownership in 2020.
- Milne Point transferred to Hilcorp ownership in 2020.
- Point Thompson transferred to Hilcorp ownership in 2020.
- Trans-Alaska Pipeline System transferred to Hilcorp ownership in 2020.

== Azerbaijan ==
- Azeri-Chirag-Guneshli, comprises five producing offshore facilities with estimated reserves of 5,5 billion barrels of oil.
- Shahdeniz, estimated reserves around 35 tcf, or 1 billion m3 of gas.

== Egypt ==
The Egypt business unit is operated from Cairo.

== North American Gas ==
- Permian
- East Texas
- Arkoma
- Hugoton
- San Juan Basin
- Wamsutter
- Jonah/Moxa/Overthrust
- Tuscaloosa
- Woodford Shale

== Vietnam ==
Vietnam operations are run from Sunbury-on-Thames, England.

== Angola ==
Operations in Angola are run from the BP office in Sunbury-on-Thames, England.

- Plutonio oilfield

== Australasia ==
Operations in Australasia are managed from Jakarta, Indonesia and Perth, Australia.

- North Rankin gasfield
- Angel gasfield
- Goodwyn gasfield
