= Matt Linning =

Scottish engineer

Matthew MacKinnon Linning CBE (2 March 1924 – 21 December 1986) was a Scottish engineer, and was project director for the BP Forties Oil Field in the 1970s; this field is the largest oil field in the North Sea.

== Early life ==
He studied electrical engineering at the Royal Technical College in Glasgow, graduating in 1944. He did his National Service, becoming a captain in the Royal Engineers.

== Career ==
He entered the oil industry in 1947.

=== BP ===
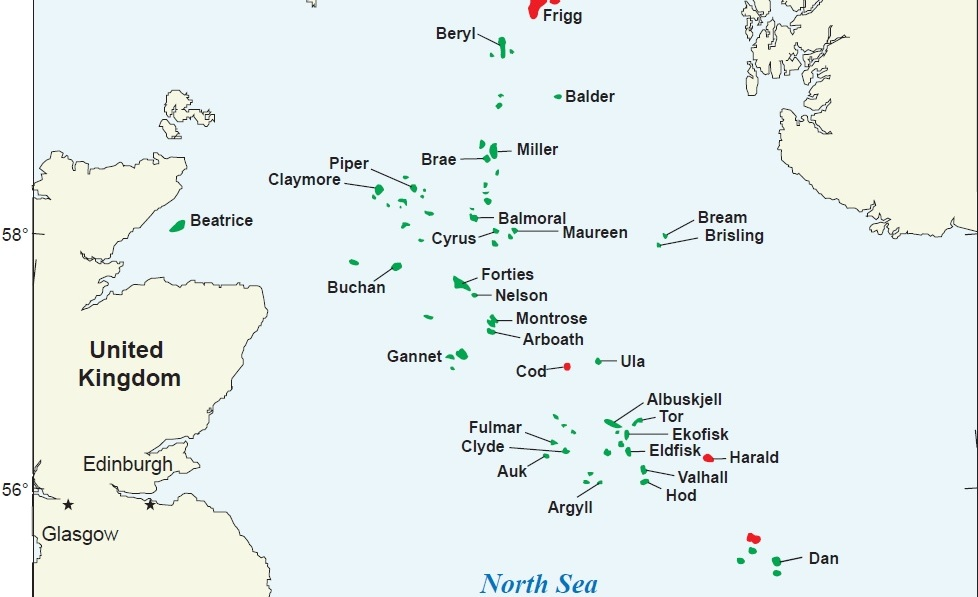
North Sea oil fields

Until the mid-1960s no-one knew that the North Sea contained so much oil (United Kingdom Continental Shelf, or UKCS). Britain imported all of its oil, costing around $1bn per year. Sea Quest discovered the Forties oil field on 7 October 1970; the vessel had also discovered the first North Sea oil field on 14 September 1969; Sea Quest had a significant effect on the UK economy. The Forties field is around 110 miles east of Aberdeen. During 1971 and 1972 BP drilled to a depth of 7,000 feet, and estimated the field to contain around 1.8 billion barrels of oil.

He joined BP in 1969, and was made responsible for expansion at Llandarcy oil refinery, the UK's first oil refinery. He became head of the BP Forties Development Group in 1972, the height of the North Sea oil bonanza. He remained in charge of the Forties oil field until 1977. Four platforms were built in the field (Block 21/10); each was 16,800 tonnes and 550 feet high, with two built by Highland Fabricators (HiFab) at Nigg Bay in the Cromarty Firth; the Forties pipeline system came ashore at Cruden Bay, then to Grangemouth Refinery (Kinneil Kerse). He was an executive at BP Petroleum Development. In April 1976, his team at the Forties field received a Queen's Award.

In February 1975 he became general manager at BP Petroleum Development. On 3 November 1975, the Queen came to BP's headquarters at Dyce to switch on the BP Forties field, in his presence.

He left BP in 1978. Production from the Forties field peaked in 1979 at 500,000 barrels per day. BP would drill oil from the Forties field for 27 years.

== Personal life ==
He died aged 62 in December 1986 in west London. At BP he was captain of the BP football team at Aberdeen. He enjoyed reading the works of Charles Dickens. He was married and had a son and two daughters. He was made an OBE in the 1969 New Year Honours, and a CBE in the 1976 New Year Honours.

Business positions
Preceded by New position	Development manager of the BP Forties Development Group; 1972–1977	Succeeded by
