= Iolair =

Ship

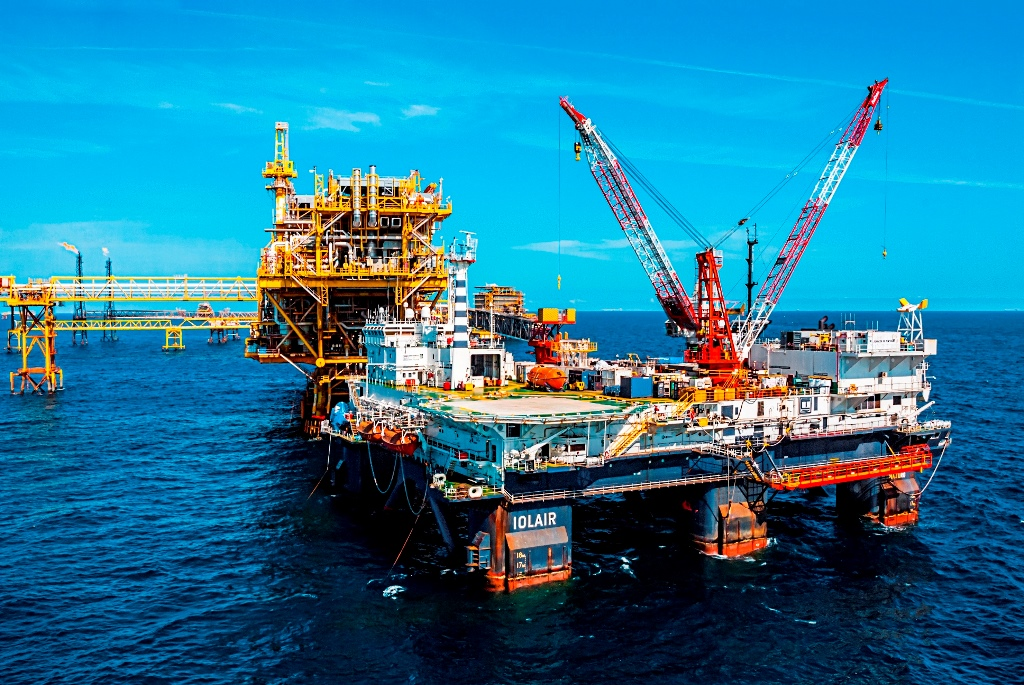
- Iolair in the Gulf of Mexico 2017

History
- Name: Iolair
- Owner: Cotemar, S.A. de C.V.; Iolair Offshore Pte Ltd 2002-2023; Reading & Bates (Caledonia) Ltd 2000–2002; R & B Falcon (UK) Ltd.1999–2000; Reading & Bates Drilling Co. 1995–1999; BP 1982–1995
- Operator: Cotemar, S.A. de C.V.
- Port of registry: Mexico, Isla del Carmen, Campeche; Marshall Islands, Majuro; Bahamas 2001–2006; United Kingdom 1982–2001
- Builder: Lithgows Limited; Greenock, Scotland
- Laid down: 5 January 1980
- Launched: 6 April 1981
- Completed: 8 August 1982
- Identification: Call sign: V7IS9; DNV ID: 20495; IMO number: 7816070; MMSI number: 538002446
- Status: Operational

General characteristics
- Class & type: DNV: 1A1 column-stabilised unit; DYNPOS-AUTR
- Tonnage: 15,765 GT; 4,746 NT
- Length: 102 m (335 ft)
- Beam: 76.5 m (251 ft)
- Draught: 15.25 m (50.0 ft)
- Installed power: 20,970kW
- Propulsion: Diesel-electric 6 x 5 Wartsila 7L32 x 3490 kW each; 4 × electric motors of 3000 shp each, driving 2 propellers; 1 MAN-Harland & Wolf 18ASV25/30 3520 kW
- Speed: 12 kn (22 km/h; 14 mph)
- Crew: 51

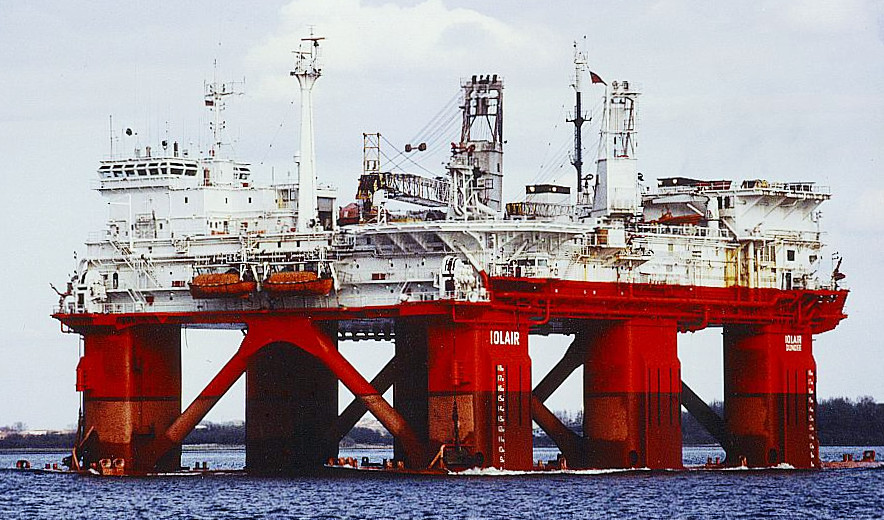
Iolair on Elbe river in 1990

Iolair (Gaelic for eagle) is a specialised semi-submersible offshore platform designed for BP to support and service oil platforms in the North Sea and served as an emergency support vessel (ESV) in the Forties Oil Field. Since 2000 it has been working in the Cantarell Field, Mexico as an offshore construction and maintenance service vessel operated by Cotemar S.A de C.V.

== Particulars ==
Iolair is a self-propelled, twin hull, vessel and operates as a dynamically positioned (DP) construction support vessel. The vessel can operate up to a water depth of 488 metres (1,601 ft), is 102 metres (335 ft) long and 51 metres (167 ft) wide, and has 350 beds with single and double occupancy.

This unique vessel did not start as an ESV, but rather as the concept of a maintenance and support vessel (MSV). It was proposed for the Forties oil field, jointly owned by British National Oil Corporation and operated by BP Petroleum Development Company Ltd in the North Sea. A particular feature of the design by the Naval Architects was that there was no cross-bracing between the pontoons. Instead, the platform was given extra strength by a box-girder construction and diagonal bracing was arranged from the centre of the platform to the pontoons. This arrangement remained virtually unchanged to the build completion and offered exceptional speed when the vessel was de-ballasted on the surface. The intention was to achieve a rapid response to emergencies, wherever they might be experienced in the North Sea.

As an MSV, the vessel was always conceived to provide accommodation for about 220 persons, saturation diving facilities, a large workshop, craneage, and helicopter landing area with hangar and re-fueling. All were still featured in the eventual design but had been enhanced with other features and sophistication much of which was to support the emergency role. ESV incorporated novelty and ideas that were years ahead of their time. Indeed, part of the brief was that she should still be modern ten years after entering service.

The saturation diving system was equipped with an advanced launch and recovery system.

== History ==
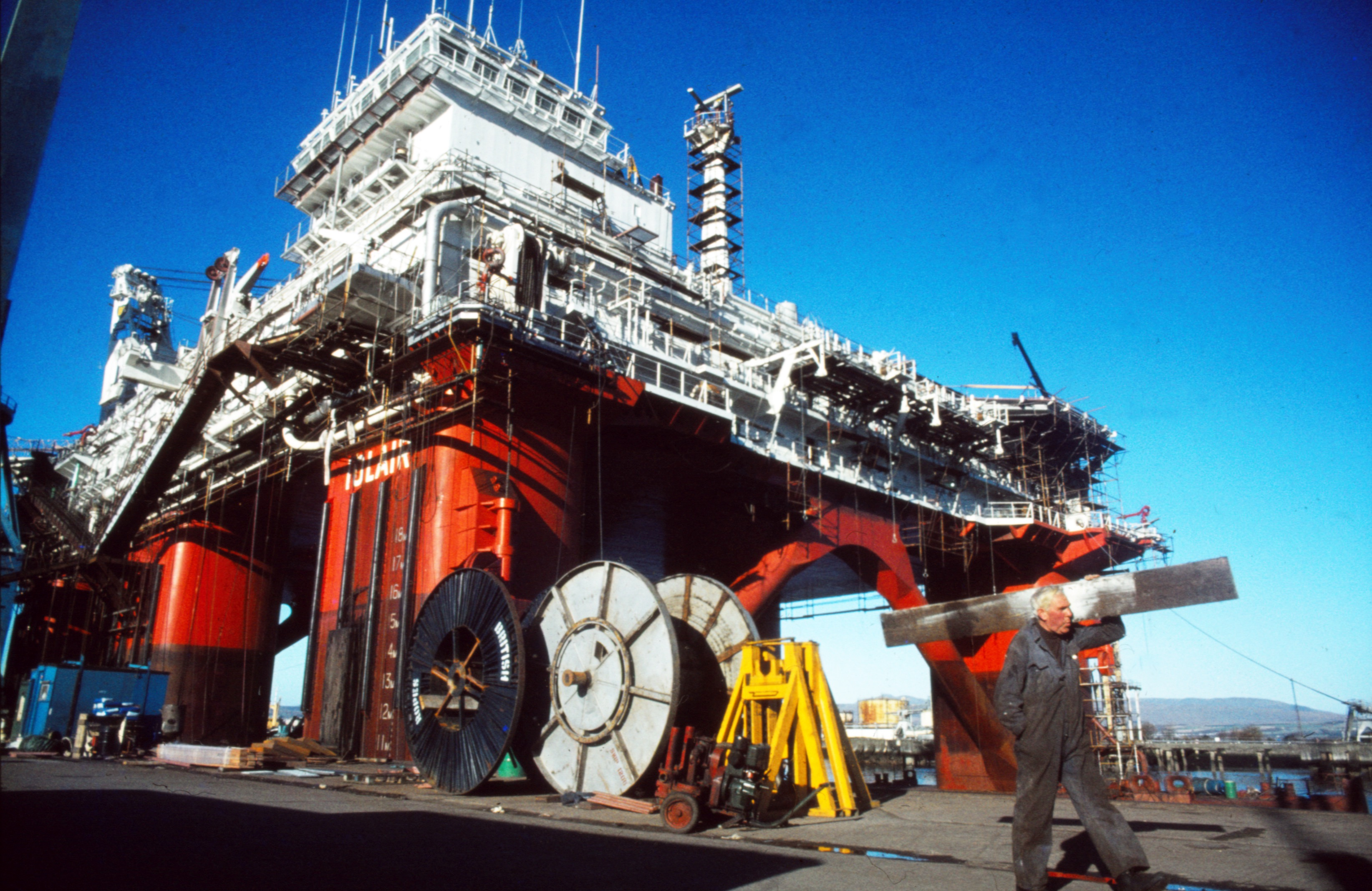
Iolair under construction at Scott Lithgow

Designed by Victor Griffin Carrell and Eric Tim's for BP. She was built by Scott Lithgow in Port Glasgow, and launched on 6 April 1981. In her early years, she was based in the BP Forties Oil Field.

In 1995, she was sold to U.S. drilling company Reading & Bates. She was to be converted to a workover/well intervention vessel and was stationed West of Shetland. The modifications included removal of some of the top structures, removal of the fire-fighting systems, closing of the dive tube and wave surge tank. However the intended conversion was never carried out and she was heavily involved in the installation of subsea production equipment using Remote Operated Vehicles. She was also heavily involved in the commissioning of the Foinaven and Schiehallion floating production vessels.

In 2000 she left the UK oilfields and went to the Bay of Campeche, Mexico, working in the Cantarell Field. There she carries out construction and platform support work. She was sold in 2001 by Transocean, who had taken over Reading and Bates, then sold to Exeter Marine Ltd. and since 2017 is owned by Iolair Offshore Pte Ltd. and registered in the Marshall Islands, a long way from her original registered port of Dundee in Scotland.

== Industry firsts ==
- Heave/swell compensation in the diving tube to enable operation in rougher weather.
- A Citadel area to which people could retire and survive if the vessel was engulfed in gas.
- A drenching system to cool exterior surfaces if the vessel was close to a burning platform.
- The largest capacity and longest range firefighting monitors ever at sea.
- Fixed water-cannon on the after columns to cool the underside of production platforms.

Iolair is assured of its place in history by being the subject of a 28p commemorative stamp issued by Post Office Ltd. on 25 May 1983. This was one of a series of three stamps celebrating British Engineering Achievements.
