= Andrew oilfield =

Hydrocarbon field

- Location within North Sea
- Country: Scotland, United Kingdom
- Location: North Sea
- Offshore/onshore: offshore
- Coordinates: 58°05′N 1°15′E
- Operator: BP

Field history
- Discovery: 1974
- Start of development: 1994
- Start of production: 1996

Production
- Estimated oil in place: 150 million barrels (~2.0×10^{7} t)
- Estimated gas in place: 0.245×10^{9} cu ft (6.9×10^{6} m^{3})
- Producing formations: Cretaceous and Palaeocene rocks

The Andrew oilfield is a relatively small hydrocarbon field in the UK sector of the North Sea, 230 kilometres (140 mi) North-East of Aberdeen and it is operated by BP. It is produced from a single platform, which is also the hub of the Kinnoull, Cyrus and Farragon subsea developments.

== Discovery and development ==
BNOC/Britoil originally discovered petroleum in the Palaeocene rock in block 16/28 of the UKCS in 1974, with further appraisal work conducted by ConocoPhillips the following year. A gas reservoir was also discovered in the Cretaceous rock below the Palaeocene. It is named after an early Celtic saint, St Cyrus is a coastal village near Montrose.

At the time, the small size of the field made it uneconomical to develop. It was not until twenty years later when BP put together an alliance of seven contractors to share in the risk of development, including Brown & Root, Santa Fe, Saipem, Highlands Fabricators, Allseas, Emtunga and Trafalgar House.

In 1994, the project was sanctioned and first oil was produced from predrilled wells in 1996. On 07/01/2020 BP announced that the asset would be divested to Premier Oil Ltd. The sale of the asset subsequently fell through.

== Reserves ==
The Andrew is estimated to have 150 million barrels (24×10^{6} m^{3}) of liquid hydrocarbons, mostly oil, with some natural gas condensate. The Andrew oil is light with an API gravity of 40°. There is also a gas cap in the Palaeocene reservoir in addition to the lower cretaceous reservoir and the associated gas from the oil. There is estimated to be 245 million cubic feet (6.9×10^{6} m^{3}) of recoverable gas, though the lower cretaceous reservoir is not fully appraised.

== Hardware ==
The Andrew field is produced using a fixed platform, with topsides facilities supported on a four leg steel jacket. The platform was built by Highland Fabricators at Nigg Bay and was installed in March 1996. The platform is relatively small accommodating only 80 people. It contains a full process plant for separating water and gas from the production fluids. Platform power is provided from three 6MW gas turbines, fed principally from produced gas.

There are 17 operational wells, 15 producing oil from the Palaeocene, one reinjecting gas into the gas cap and another producing gas from the Cretaceous reservoir (known among the asset simply as "The Lower Cretaceous"). The Andrew well bay has plenty of room for further wells as it has a total of 24 slots, only 18 of which are occupied (17 with wells and one slot with umbilical lines to Farragon). The Andrew also receives flowlines from the Cyrus subsea wells.

The Xmas trees and wellheads are supplied by Vetco. The four original pre-drilled wells (though one has since been side-tracked) on the South side of the well bay use slightly smaller wellheads than the rest because they were part of the original template before the platform was put in place.

The Xmas trees have the unusual property of having two Swab valves, rather than just one. The intention behind this was to allow the rigging up and down of pressure control equipment for well work without having to shut in the well. This would save money in lost revenue for the day the well would normally not be flowing. However, the experience over the past ten years has shown that the increased cost of maintaining an extra valve does not match the savings.

Processed oil is exported to the Forties pipeline system then on to Cruden Bay. Natural gas is exported to the Central Area Transmission System to Teesside. Produced water is cleaned in the process plant to sufficient quality that it is dumped overboard.

== Logo ==
Andrew is named for the patron saint of Scotland, which is a very popular name in general among the Scots. For this reason, the logo of the Andrew platform is more "Scottish" than many others. It consists of a Saltire shaped as a drop of liquid and is more prominently displayed than the logos of other platforms.

== Cyrus and Farragon ==
Cyrus and Farragon are two smaller satellite oil fields in the 16/28 Andrew block. Cyrus was originally produced in 1990 by OPV Seillean. It was then redeveloped along with the main Andrew project for restart as a subsea tieback in 1996. It produces through two horizontal wells (though one is shut in) and the unprocessed production fluids are piped through a riser to the platform where it is produced through its own process (for metering purposes). The separated products are then exported along with the rest of the Andrew export. Cyrus is named after a Celtic saint.

Farragon is a recent development. This small Palaeocene field was developed by a dedicated team at BP's North Sea headquarters in Dyce, though it has been producing through two wells since 2006. The produced fluids are transported directly to the export line without processing, though umbilical lines tie back to the platform.

== See also ==
- North Sea oil
- Oil fields operated by BP
