= Armada gasfield =

Natural gas fields in Central North Sea

Armada gasfields
- Location within North Sea
- Country: Scotland, United Kingdom
- Region: Central North Sea
- Block: 16/29a, 16/29c 22/5a, 22/5b, 22/4a
- Offshore/onshore: offshore
- Coordinates: 57.96°N 1.816°E
- Operator: Shell
- Partners: Shell, Centrica,

Field history
- Discovery: 1980
- Start of development: 1994
- Start of production: 1997

Production
- Current production of oil: 24,000 barrels per day (~1.2×10^{6} t/a)
- Current production of gas: 450×10^{6} cu ft/d (13×10^{6} m^{3}/d)
- Estimated oil in place: 7.9 million tonnes (~ 9.2×10^{6} m^{3} or 58 million bbl)
- Estimated gas in place: 34.15×10^{9} m^{3} (1.206×10^{12} cu ft)
- Producing formations: Palaeocene Maureen sandstone, Jurassic Ula sandstone

The Armada gas field complex is a group of natural gas fields located in the Central North Sea 250 kilometres (160 mi) NE of Aberdeen, within the United Kingdom Continental Shelf. The field was operated by BG Group and is now operated by Shell. The complex consists of several fields developed via a central platform located in 88 metres (289 ft) of water. The Fleming and Hawkins fields were discovered in 1980 and the Drake and Seymour Fields in 1982. Development approval was granted in 1994 and production started in 1997. The gas is exported via the Central Area Transmission System through a link to the Everest gasfield. Oil is exported via the Forties oil field to Grangemouth. The fields had a maximum production rate of 450 million cubic feet per day (13×10^{6} m^{3}/d) and 24 thousand barrels per day (3.8×10^{3} m^{3}/d).

== Fields ==
All fields are named after British sailors who fought the Spanish Armada. And are developed via a single platform which was installed in 1997. Export capacity is 28,000 barrels of oil and 10.76 MM cubic metres per day

- Fleming - this field has a Palaeocene Maureen Formation turbidite sandstone reservoir pinching out to the east. It is developed via 6 extended reach wells.
- Drake - This field has a Jurassic Ula Formation sandstone reservoir and is developed via two production wells.
- Hawkins - This field has a Jurassic sandstone reservoir and is developed via a single well.
- Seymour - SW Seymour has a Jurassic reservoir and is developed via a single well from the platform. NW Seymour is an oilfield developed via a single sub-sea well.

The Maria Field, located in adjacent UKCS block 16/29 a is developed via a sub-sea manifold tied back to the Armada Platform. The Gaupe and Rev fields in an adjacent Norwegian blocks were also tied back as a sub sea development to Armada.

The fields are scheduled to be decommissioned at the end of 2017

== Ownership ==
Armada had a complex ownership history being located over 4 north sea blocks (16/29a, 22/5b, 22/4a and 22/5a). It was one of the first UKCS fields with a fixed equity unitisation agreement. Original equity owners were Amoco, British Gas, Hess, ENI, Phillips Petroleum and Fina. There have been a series of complex asset sales and swaps.

in 2017 ownership was:

- Shell (ex BG Group) - 76.42%
- Centrica - 23.58%

Shell are in the process of selling the Armada complex together with other UKCS assets to Chrysaor ltd
