= West of Shetland pipeline =

West of Shetland Pipeline

Location
- Country: United Kingdom
- Direction: west–east
- Start: Foinaven oilfield
- Passes through: Northern North Sea
- To: Sullom Voe Terminal, Shetland Isles

General information
- Type: natural gas
- Partners: bp
- Operator: enquest

Technical information
- Length: 188 km (117 mi)
- Maximum discharge: 1.8 billion cubic meters per year

The West of Shetland Pipeline (WOSP) is a pipeline system which transports natural gas from three offshore fields in the West of Shetland area to Sullom Voe Terminal in the Shetland Isles of Scotland.

== West of Shetland area ==
The West of Shetland area is a region in the northern Atlantic Ocean, where there are currently three developed offshore fields; Schiehallion, Foinaven and Clair. A number of further hydrocarbon discoveries have been made in the area, but these are not currently considered to be economic due to the high costs of development. The Laggan-Tormore and Rosebank-Lochnagar discoveries are in the process of being further appraised for development, but the WOSP is considered to be unable to carry the additional gas production from these fields.

== Ownership ==
WOSP is owned collectively by the owners of the Schiehallion, Loyal, Foinaven and East Foinaven fields; each owner company holds divided capacity rights in accordance with its ownership interest. It is operated by BP.

== Technical description ==
The system consists of a 20-inch (510 mm) trunkline which begins near Schiehallion and has length of 188 kilometres (117 mi). It has a maximum capacity of 1.8 billion cubic metres (64 billion cubic feet) of gas per year.

Natural gas from the Clair field is delivered into the pipeline at the Clair tee midway along the pipeline 105 kilometres (65 mi) from Sullom Voe.

Natural gas from WOSP is further transported by East of Shetland Pipeline (EOSP), NLGP and FLAGS/SEGAL systems for the delivery into the UK National Transmission System at St Fergus in the northeast of Scotland, and for the delivery of separated natural gas liquids into either the Shell operated SEGAL system or the onshore section of the BP-operated Forties pipeline system. The gas delivered from the pipeline is also part of the Magnus oilfield enhanced oil recovery scheme where gas and natural gas liquids are piped to the Magnus platform and injected into the reservoir to increase the recoverable reserves from the development.
