= Everest gasfield =

UK gasfield in the North Sea

- Location within North Sea
- Country: Scotland, United Kingdom
- Region: Central North Sea
- Blocks: 22/9, 22/10a and 22/14a
- Offshore/onshore: offshore
- Coordinates: 57.75°N 1.801°E
- Operator: Chrysaor
- Partners: 100% equity

Field history
- Discovery: 1982
- Start of development: 1991
- Start of production: 1993
- Peak year: 2000

Production
- Current production of oil: 10,000 barrels per day (~5.0×10^{5} t/a)
- Current production of gas: 135×10^{6} cu ft/d (3.8×10^{6} m^{3}/d)
- Estimated gas in place: 770×10^{9} cu ft (22×10^{9} m^{3})
- Producing formations: Palaeocene Forties sandstone, Paleocene Andrew sandstone

The Everest gasfield is located in the Central North Sea, 233 kilometres (145 mi) east of Aberdeen, Scotland. It lies in the United Kingdom Continental Shelf blocks 22/9, 22/10a and 22/14a. The gasfield was discovered by Amoco in 1982 with first gas produced in 1993.

== Ownership ==
Until 2009, the field was operated by BP (formerly Amoco). As a result of assets' swap between BP and BG Group in 2009, BG Group became the largest stakeholder of field with 80.46% interest and it took over operatorship of the field. Other partners beside of BG Group are Amerada Hess, and Total. The 1.0134% interest, which was owned by ConocoPhillips, was acquired by BG Group in 2007. On 1 November 2017 Chrysaor announced they had acquired a 100 per cent equity interest in the Everest Field, together with interests in the Beryl, Buzzard, Elgin-Franklin, Erskine, Armada, J Block, Lomond and Schiehallion fields.

== Infrastructure ==
The field is named after George Everest. There is a permanent production installation, North Everest, in the Northern area of the field (located 57.75°N 1.801°E: 288 ft (88 m) water depth) containing 11 surface wells drilled from the platform. A flowline connects to two subsea wells in the South Everest area 7.1 km south of the North Everest installation and a further flowline connects to two subsea wells in the Everest East Expansion area 6.8 km north east of the installation. The manned North Everest platform, built by Highland Fabricators, is a combined wellhead/production/quarters platform receiving and treating well fluids. There is accommodation for 80 personnel. The North Everest platform is connected to the unmanned CATS (Central Area Transmission System) Riser platform by a 90-metre (300 ft) metal bridge. The CATS Platform is the location for the starting point of the CATS pipeline, which transmits gas from Everest and a number of others including Lomond and Armada, to the CATS terminal at Teesside. Condensates and liquids from North Everest are routed to Cruden Bay via Forties oilfield.

Everest contains two main reservoirs: the Palaeocene Forties sandstone and the deeper Paleocene Andrew sandstone. The structure is a 3 way dip closure with a stratigraphic pinchout to the east.

== Operations ==
Everest well fluids are routed to the vertical HP (High Pressure) Separator where condensate is separated from the gas stream. Wells may also be routed to the vertical test separator where 3-phase (Gas/Condensate/Water) separation and measurement of each stream takes place. Gas from the HP Separator (and the Test Separator) is cooled by cooling medium and flows to the vertical TEG Contactor Scrubber where condensate is recovered. The gas is heated with heating medium prior entering the base of the TEG Contactor where it is in counter-current contact with triethylene glycol. The dried gas flows to the Dense Phase Suction Scrubber where any recovered liquids are removed. A side stream of fuel gas for the installation is taken from the Dense Phase Separator. The main gas stream is compressed in the Dense Phase Compressor to c. 140 bar. The gas is metered prior to export across the bridge to the CATS Riser platform and through the CATS pipeline. In later field life, as well pressures declines, further lower pressure compressors were installed between the HP Separator and the TEG Contactor Scrubber. The gas compression capacity is 135 million cubic feet per day (3.8 million cubic metres per day) at standard pressure.

Condensate from the HP Separator and the Test Separator is routed to the horizontal IP (Intermediate Pressure) Separator where 3-phase separation takes place. Vapour is routed to the MP Vapour Recovery Compressor and thence to the TEG Contactor Scrubber. Separated water is routed to the Produced water system for oil removal prior to overboard disposal. The produced water system has a capacity of 5,000 barrels (790 m^{3}) per day. Condensate from the IP Separator is heated and routed to the LP (Low Pressure) Separator where further 3-phase separation takes place. Vapour is cooled with cooling medium and flows to the LP Vapour Recovery Suction Scrubber where further condensate is removed. Vapour from the LP Vapour Recovery Suction Scrubber is compressed in the LP Vapour Recovery Compressor and after cooling is routed to the MP Vapour Recovery Compressor. Condensate from the LP Separator is cooled and routed to the Condensate Surge Drum. From the Surge Drum condensate is metered and exported to the Forties Field via the Pipeline Pumps. The condensate export capacity is 10,000 barrels (1,600 m^{3}) per day.

== See also ==
List of oil and gas fields in the North Sea

Forties oil field
