= Harding Field =

Harding Field may refer to:

- Harding oilfield, an oil field in the North Sea operated by the Abu Dhabi National Energy Company
- Baton Rouge Metropolitan Airport, used by the US Air Force as Harding Field in World War II
