= Foinaven oilfield =

Offshore oil field west of Shetland, Scotland

- Location within Scotland
- Country: Scotland, United Kingdom
- Region: West of Shetland
- Blocks: 204/19; 204/24a
- Offshore/onshore: Offshore
- Coordinates: 60°15′N 4°30′W
- Partners: BP (72%); RockRose Energy (28%)

Field history
- Discovery: October 1990
- Start of development: 1994
- Start of production: 1997

Production
- Current production of oil: 12,000 barrels per day (~6.0×10^{5} t/a)
- Recoverable oil: 200 million barrels (~2.7×10^{7} t)

Foinaven oilfield is a deep-water oil development approximately 190 kilometres (120 mi) west of the Shetland Islands. Together with Schiehallion, Loyal, Solan, Clair and Lancaster fields it forms the area generally termed as the West of Shetland.

== Field description ==
Foinaven oil field was discovered in 1992. It is located at a water depth of 400–600 metres (1,300–2,000 ft), and was the first development made beyond the United Kingdom Continental Shelf. It is named after a mountain in the North West Highlands. Recoverable oil reserves of Foinaven are estimated to be between 250 and 600 million barrels (40,000,000 and 95,000,000 m^{3}).

== Production ==
The Foinaven field is operated by BP in partnership with RockRose Energy. The development of the field was sanctioned in 1994 and the oil production in Foinaven started in November 1997. The phase 1 with 21 wells was completed in 2000. It had a designed oil production capacity of 85,000 barrels per day (13,500 m^{3}/d) of oil.

Oil was produced by subsea wells via a manifold, which passed through rigid flowlines and then flexible risers into a Floating Production Storage and Offloading system (FPSO).

The FPSO, Petrojarl Foinaven, which was operated by Teekay Petrojarl, had an overall length of 240 metres (790 ft) and an oil storage capacity of 300,000 barrels (48,000 m^{3}). Surface process facilities consisted of two parallel oil separation and gas compression trains with a combined liquid handling capacity of 145,000 barrels per day (23,100 m^{3}/d) of crude oil and 114 million cubic feet per day (3.2×10^{6} m^{3}/d) of associated gas. It was permanently stationed in the field and the crude oil was exported by shuttle tankers. Oil was exported primarily to the Flotta oil terminal in Orkney with smaller amounts going to Tranmere Oil Terminal on Merseyside.

Approximately half of the produced associated gas was used for enhanced oil recovery in the field. The remainder was exported through the West of Shetland pipeline to the Sullom Voe Terminal. Some of the exported gas was used as fuel in the Fortum operated Sullom Voe power station. The remainder was enriched with liquefied petroleum gas and exported to the Magnus platform for enhanced oil recovery in the Magnus field.

According to BP, to date, 390 million barrels of oil have been recovered from the Foinaven area.

== Suspension of Production ==
In April 2021, BP suspended production from the Foinaven field as the long-serving FPSO Petrojarl Foinaven through which the fields were producing oil was nearing the end of its 25-year design life. It was removed in 2022 to be scrapped at Frederikshavn in Denmark. BP and its partners have begun evaluating options to develop the estimated remaining resources of up to a possible 200 million barrels from the Foinaven field and surrounding area.
