= Ninian Central Platform =

Oil platform (1978-2017) located in the North Sea

Coordinates: 60°53′N 1°26′E

The Ninian Central Platform is an oil platform in the North Sea. When constructed in Loch Kishorn, Scotland in 1978 the 600,000 tonne platform was the world's largest man-made movable object before being towed to its current position and sunk to the sea floor.

It is a circular concrete gravity structure, 140 m in diameter at its base, with seven concentric walls of stepped heights intersected by radial walls at 45-degree angles. A 14 m wide central shaft is surrounded by a breakwater wall ("Jarlan Wall") 45 m in diameter and 1.6 m thick pierced with 1.5 m diameter holes. Between these two walls drill slots are arranged for drilling up to 42 wells.

== The Ninian Field ==
The Ninian field lies in United Kingdom Continental Shelf (UKCS) Blocks 3/2, 3/3, 3/7 and 3/8. The reservoir is contained in the marine-deltaic sandstones of the Middle Jurassic Brent Group. There were estimated to be 2,920 million barrels (464 million cubic metres) of oil in place of which 35 to 40 percent was thought to be recoverable. Ninian oil is a paraffinic-naphthenic type with an API gravity of 36°. The fabrication details of the three platforms are shown in the table.

Ninian platforms – construction
Installation	Fabrication contractor	Site	Type	Installation date
Ninian Central	Howard Doris	Loch Kishorn	Concrete	May 1978
Ninian North	Highlands Fabricators	Nigg Bay	Steel	July 1978
Ninian South	Highlands Fabricators	Nigg Bay	Steel	June 1977

Ninian Central operates in conjunction with the Ninian Southern and Ninian Northern platforms. First oil was produced from the field in December 1978. Production reached a peak of 315,000 barrels (50,100 m^{3}) of oil per day in the summer of 1982. At the end of 1988 over 811 million bbl (129 million m^{3}) had been produced.

Originally operated by Chevron Petroleum (UK), a division of Chevron, the field was acquired and operated by Oryx UK Energy Co. in late 1996 and then by Kerr-McGee from 2000. CNR International assumed ownership and operated the Ninian Field from 2002.

== Operations ==
As originally designed the Ninian Central oil processing facilities comprised two parallel Freewater Knock-out Vessels, crude oil coolers, crude oil booster pumps, a metering skid and Main Oil Line (MOL) pumps. After the MOL pumps the fluids were co-mingled with oil from the Brent separators, and the Strathspey, Ninian Northern, Heather and Magnus platforms. Vapour from the Freewater Knock-out Vessels was cooled and then compressed in a gas compressor then used as fuel gas or sent to flare.

Oil from the Brent system was routed to the Brent HP separator and separated oil flowed to the Brent LP Separator. From there oil was sent to the booster and export pumps. Gas from the Brent separators flowed to the Ninian gas compression.

Gas from the Statfjord pipeline flowed to the Statfjord Slug Catcher then to the Statfjord Gas Cooler. Gas from the Brent and Statfjord systems was compressed, dehydrated by counter-current contact with glycol. After cooling gas was compressed for export and recovered natural gas liquids (NGL) sent to the oil export line.

Ninian Central acted as an oil reception and export hub for a number of installations in the Northern North Sea. Ninian Central receives, or received, oil and gas from the following installations:

- Ninian Northern (24" oil, 10" gas)
- Ninian Southern (24" oil, 8" gas)
- Strathspey (8" gas, 8" gas, 8" oil, 10" oil)
- Statfjord (8" gas)
- Heather (16" oil)
- Magnus (24" oil)
- Alwyn (12" oil)
- Lyell (12" and 8" oil)
- Brent A (16" gas export)
- Ninian Central was formerly connected to the Western Leg Gas Pipeline.

Oil from the field is exported through the 36" Ninian pipeline to Sullom Voe (175 km).

== Ninian Southern ==
The Ninian Southern installation is steel jacket platform located 3 miles south of Ninian Central. As originally conceived the process plant comprised the following oil and gas facilities. Well fluids were routed to one of two parallel horizontal Free Water Knock Out Vessels, operating at about 6.5 bar and 90 °C, where 3-phase (oil/gas/water) separation took place. Oil from the vessels was cooled and flowed to the Crude Oil Booster Pumps, then through a metering package and to the Main Oil Line Pumps and onward by 24” pipeline to Ninian Central. Produced water from the Free Water Knock Out Vessels was treated to remove oil prior to overboard disposal. Vapour from the vessels was cooled in Gas Coolers and was then compressed in the First Stage Compressor and cooled again. Some of this gas was used in the fuel gas system. The main gas flow was compressed in the Second Stage Compressor and then dehydrated through counter-current contact with glycol in the Glycol Absorber. The dry gas was cooled and chilled in a refrigeration Chiller. Condensed liquids were routed to the LPG metering system and export with the oil stream and dry gas was routed to the fuel gas system and any excess to by 8” pipeline to Ninian Central.

Fluids from the subsea Lyell field were routed to the Lyell Slugcatcher and thence to the Lyell Separator. From here oil was pumped to the metering package and co-mingled with the Ninian Southern export oil stream to Ninian Central. Vapour from the Lyell Separator was compressed and mixed with the Ninian Southern gas prior to further compression and dehydration.

== Ninian Northern ==
The Ninian Northern installation was a steel jacket platform located 3.2 miles north-west of Ninian Central in a water depth of 141 metres. The platform was installed in June 1978 and was designed to operate as a satellite flowing well fluids directly to Ninian Central although it was equipped to partial process the well fluids. Production from Ninian Northern started in August 1980, and reached a peak of 89,587 Barrels of Oil per Day in June 1981. As originally conceived the process facilities comprised the following processes. Well fluids were routed to one of the separators either the High Pressure Separator or the Low Pressure Separator. Each acted as a 3-phase (oil/gas/water) separator. Oil from the separators was co-mingled and sent directly to Ninian Central via a 24” pipeline. As wellhead pressures declined a multi-phase pump was installed to provide sufficient pressure to export the oil to Ninian Central. Vapour from the Separators was used as fuel gas excess gas was routed to Ninian Central through a 10” gas pipeline. Produced water from the Separators was treated in hydrocyclones to remove oil prior to overboard disposal.

Ninian Northern formerly had a water injection system to water-flood the reservoir; this was subsequently decommissioned.

A Cessation of Production notice was approved by the Oil and Gas Authority (OGA) in November 2016. Production permanently ceased on Ninian Northern on 18 May 2017. Removal of the topsides was completed in 2021 and removal of the jacket in 2022.
