= Lancaster oilfield =

Oil field near Scotland

- Location within North Sea
- Country: United Kingdom
- Region: United Kingdom territorial waters
- Location: West of Shetland
- Block: 205/21a, 205/22a, 205/26b and 205/22b
- Offshore/onshore: offshore
- Coordinates: 60°11′N 3°52′W
- Operator: Hurricane Energy

Field history
- Discovery: 2009
- Start of development: November 2016
- Start of production: June 2019

Production
- Current production of oil: 13,300 barrels per day (~6.63×10^{5} t/a)
- Estimated oil in place: 3,333 million barrels (~4.547×10^{8} t)
- Producing formations: Naturally fractured Precambrian age granitic basement

The Lancaster oilfield is an offshore oil field in Scottish territorial waters 100 kilometres (62 mi) west of Shetland and 170 kilometres (110 mi) north of mainland Scotland in water depths of around 155 metres (509 ft). It comprises licence blocks 205/21a, 205/22a, 205/26b and 205/22b in Licence P1368 (Central), all of which are fully owned by Hurricane Energy. It is the first naturally fractured basement oilfield in the United Kingdom Continental Shelf to reach production.

== History ==
Exploration well 205-21-1A was drilled in 1974 by Royal Dutch Shell. It discovered light oil in naturally fractured Precambrian age granitic basement but was plugged and abandoned. This was the first well drilled by semi-submersible rig Ocean Voyager after construction. An astonishing feat West of Shetland in wintertime.

In 2009, Hurricane Energy drilled well 205/21a-4 much deeper into the naturally fractured basement and discovered a substantial column of light crude oil with 38° API and a flow rate of 1,367 barrels (217 m^{3}) of oil per day. Subsequently, a sidetrack well, 205/21a-4Z, was drilled in 2010 which flowed light oil at 2,885 barrels (459 m^{3}) of oil per day. The 205/21a-4 well was plugged and abandoned. The 205/21a-4Z well was suspended.

Well 205/21a-6 was drilled in 2014. This included a one kilometre horizontal section. It produced a natural flow rate of 5,300 barrels (840 m^{3}) of oil per day. This increased to 9,800 barrels (1,560 m^{3}) per day with an electric submersible pump ("ESP"). Both figures were constrained by surface equipment capabilities and it was reported that the well could deliver 20,000 barrels (3,180 m^{3}) per day with a modest 120psi drawdown under production conditions. The well had a very high productivity index ("PI") of 160 stb/psi/d. It was suspended as a future producer.

Well 205/21a-7 was drilled in 2016 and produced 11,000 barrels (1,700 m^{3}) of oil per day with an ESP. It was subsequently sidetracked as 205/21a-7Z to include a one kilometre horizontal section. This produced a natural flow rate of 6,520 barrels (1,037 m^{3}) of oil per day or 15,375 barrels (2,444 m^{3}) per day with an ESP, both of which were constrained by the test equipment used, and a very high PI of 147 stb/psi/d. It too was suspended as a future producer.

== Early Production System ==
In 2016, Hurricane committed to an Early Production System ("EPS") using the Aoka Mizu Floating production storage and offloading vessel ("FPSO"), chartered from Bluewater Energy Services, for an initial six-year period with an option to extend to ten years. This will be used to generate revenue and evaluate the reservoir properties over an initial testing period expected to take 6 to 12 months followed by a production period for the remainder of the duration. The results of the initial testing will inform decisions regarding potential full field development. The EPS utilises wells 205/21a-7Z and 205/21a-6. Revenue generated from oil sales will help to fund further activities in the Lancaster Field and the adjacent Halifax, Warwick and Lincoln fields.

== Reserves, contingent resources and initially in place volumes ==
The Competent Persons Report ("CPR") published by RPS Energy on May 8, 2017, provided the following estimates of reserves, contingent resources and initially in place volumes;

- Reserves
  - 1P: 28.1 million barrels (4.5 million cubic metres) of oil equivalent
  - 2P: 37.3 million bbl (5.9 million m^{3})
  - 3P: 49.3 million bbl (7.8 million m^{3})
- Contingent resources
  - 1C: 129.1 million bbl (21 million m^{3}) of oil equivalent
  - 2C: 486.1 million bbl (77 million m^{3})
  - 3C: 1,116.7 million bbl (178 million m^{3})
- Initially in place volumes
  - Low estimate: 1,571 million bbl (250 million m^{3}) of oil equivalent
  - Best estimate: 2,326 million bbl (370 million m^{3})
  - High estimate: 3,333 million bbl (530 million m^{3})

These estimates will be re-assessed during 2020 and 2021 taking account of the findings from the Early Production System. In July 2020, Hurricane announced that the prospective resources might be materially downgraded as a result of experience with the Early Production System. An updated Competent Person's Report is expected to be published before the end of the first quarter of 2021. A further update is expected to be issued with Hurricane's interim financial results in September 2020.

== First oil ==
The Aoka Mizu FPSO arrived at the Lancaster field on 17 March 2019. Two days later, it was successfully hooked-up to the turret mooring system buoy. On 11 May 2019 hydrocarbons began flowing into the processing system of the Aoka Mizu. Following a 72-hour production test during which the planned production rate of 20,000 barrels (3,200 m^{3}) of oil per day was achieved, a press release announcing first oil was issued on 4 June 2019. When announcing first oil, Hurricane Energy forecast that production for the first three months would be 9,000 barrels (1,400 m^{3}) of oil per day and 13,000 barrels (2,100 m^{3}) per day for the following three months giving a combined average of 11,000 barrels (1,700 m^{3}) of oil per day for the first six months with production being constrained by testing activities.

== Testing phase ==
This phase involves testing the two production wells individually and together. Early test results exceeded expectations. Substantially higher flow rates and PIs were demonstrated.

Each of the two production wells flowed at more than 16,500 barrels (2,620 m^{3}) of oil per day without the need for ESP assistance. The natural flow rates were 211% higher than previous tests for the 205/21a-6 well and 153% higher than previous tests for 205/21a-7Z.

Well 205/21a-6 demonstrated a PI of 205 stb/psi/d (29.3% above previous tests) and well 205/21a-7Z demonstrated a PI of 190 stb/psi/d (28.1% above previous tests).

Production from first oil until the end of 2019 averaged 13,300 barrels (2,110 m^{3}) of oil per day which was 20.9% higher than was forecast when first oil was announced. Production in 2020 was expected to be 17,000 barrels (2,700 m^{3}) of oil per day, planned as 20,000 barrels (3,200 m^{3}) per day at 85% uptime, which includes allowances for operational downtime and shut-ins for potential tie-ins and/or de-bottlenecking. This was subject to review based upon the results of the ongoing testing phase.

The horizontal sections of the two wells are a few hundred meters apart and the natural fracture network is such that they effectively behave as a single well. Various combinations of flow rates were tested across the two wells including periods where one or both wells were shut in.

As production continued, the water cut in the 7Z well steadily increased. Although the horizontal section of this well is hundreds of meters long, the current production interval, which is near the heel of the well, coincides with a fracture containing what is currently believed to be perched water. As a result, Hurricane decided to shut in the 7Z well and test the 6 well by itself. Hurricane is considering options to relocate the production interval of the 7Z well away from the zone of perched water but any such scheme, which would require a drilling rig, is unlikely to take place during 2020. As a result of these issues, Hurricane has withdrawn production guidance for 2020.

In July 2020, Hurricane announced that ESPs had been commissioned on both wells and that production from the 7Z well had recommenced delivering a combined production of around 15,000 bopd.

Hurricane Energy is continuing to test and analyse the reservoir properties and expects to update its assessment of the Lancaster Field during 2020. This might materially reduce the prospective resources. Subsequently, an updated Competent Person's Report is expected to be published in the first quarter of 2021.

== Future activities ==
The Oil and Gas Authority required that Hurricane Energy spuds at least one additional sub vertical well before 22 December 2021 in order to further establish the size of the Lancaster Field. In addition, consideration was being given to drilling another production well. If this happened, it would be tied back to the Aoka Mizu FPSO. As a result of the COVID-19 pandemic, this date was extended by one year.

Design work to link the Aoka Mizu FPSO to the West of Shetland Pipeline ("WOSP") is ongoing. This will enable surplus natural gas to be transported to Sullom Voe Terminal in the Shetland Isles of Scotland for processing rather than being flared.

The production capacity of the Aoka Mizu is forecast to increase to 35,000 barrels (5,600 m^{3}) of oil per day in 2022, planned as 40,000 barrels (6,400 m^{3}) per day at 87.5% uptime. Some of this capacity is currently intended to be used for the adjacent Lincoln oilfield, in which Hurricane Energy has a 50% stake, pending full field development of that asset.

A full field development final investment decision for the Lancaster Field depends on the outcome of the Early Production System test phase. This may involve a farm-out or could be undertaken by Hurricane Energy itself.
