= Shetland Gas Plant =

Natural gas processing plant

- Location within Shetland
- Alternative names: SGP

General information
- Type: Gas terminal
- Location: Sullom Voe, ZE2 9UN
- Coordinates: 60.474°N 1.2615°W
- Completed: 2016
- Inaugurated: 2016

Technical details
- Floor area: 133 acres (0.54 km^{2})

The Shetland Gas Plant is a natural-gas processing plant in the Shetland Islands, Scotland.

== History ==
The Shetland Gas Plant is the collection and gas processing facility for the offshore Laggan-Tormore project, comprising two large gas and gas condensate fields. The Laggan gas field was discovered in 1986. The Tormore condensate field was discovered in 2007. The development plan for the site was approved in March 2010.

The site was formally opened by Amber Rudd, the Secretary of State for Energy and Climate Change, on 16 May 2016.

== Structure ==
The plant is connected to the Shetland Islands Regional Gas Export Pipeline (SIRGE). The plant was built by Petrofac's Offshore Engineering & Operations unit; Petrofac is a recent constituent of the FTSE 100 Index. The site and pipelines cost around £800m. The gas is exported from the site via a 230 km (140 mi) 30-inch (760 mm) diameter pipe south to the Frigg UK System in Aberdeenshire.

The site is adjacent, to the east, of the Sullom Voe Terminal.

== Operation ==
The Laggan and Tormore gas fields are around 125 km (78 mi) north-west of the Shetland Islands, in sea depths of 600 metres (2,000 ft). Production from the plant began on 8 February 2016. The production from the Laggan-Tormore project is expected to be around 93,000 barrels of oil equivalent per day.

Key data for the Laggan and Tormore fields is as follows:

Field Name	Laggan	Tormore
Block	206/1a	205/5a
Coordinates	61.045139°N 2.87056°W	60.197778°N 3.170139°W (WHPS) 60.913944°N 3.171917°W (Template / Manifold)
Discovered	1986	2007
Hydrocarbon contact, m TVDSS	3909	3785 3940
Production	Gas	Condensate
Permeability, mD	10-20070	10-20070
Oil gravity, °API		52
Oil properties		0.3 cP viscosity, 0.038%CO_{2}
Gas expansion factor, Sm^{3}/m^{3}	289	259
Salinity, ppm		6000-38000
Stock tank oil originally in place, MMstb		92
Non-associated gas in place, billion cubic feet	685	346
Operator	Total	Total
Water depth, metres	600	600
Commissioned	2016	2016
Type	Subsea steel	Subsea steel
Function	Template / Manifold	Wellhead protection structure (WHPS), Template / Manifold
Number of production wells	4	2
Subsea weight, tonnes	550	150 (WHPS), 550 (Template / Manifold)
Topsides weight, tonnes	0	0
Export	To Shetland Gas Plant via two parallel 141 km long, 18-inch diameter flowlines	

== See also ==
- St Fergus Gas Terminal
- West of Shetland pipeline
- 2016 in Scotland
