= Ninian pipeline =

Ninian Pipeline

Location
- Country: United Kingdom
- Province: East Shetland Basin
- Start: Ninian Central platform
- Passes through: North Sea
- To: Sullom Voe Terminal

General information
- Type: oil
- Partners: BG, BP, CNR International, Chevron Corporation, Eni, Lundin Petroleum, Nippon Oil, Total S.A.
- Operator: BP
- Commissioned: 1978

Technical information
- Length: 175 km (109 mi)
- Maximum discharge: 0.91 million barrels per day (~4.5×10^{7} t/a)
- Diameter: 36 in (914 mm)

The Ninian Pipeline is a 175 kilometres (109 mi) long crude oil pipeline, which runs from the Ninian Central platform in the northern North Sea to the Sullom Voe Terminal in Shetland Islands of Scotland.

== Specification ==
The Ninian pipeline was laid in July 1976. It is a X65 steel pipeline with an outside diameter of 36 inches (910 mm) with a wall thickness of 0.75 and 0.875 inches.

The pipeline has a corrosion coating and a 65 mm concrete buoyancy coating. There are 200 kg Sacrificial zinc (Impalloy) anodes at ever 12th joint, with a total mass of 150 tonnes. Buckle arrestors comprising steel sleeves 1-inch thick and 2 m long are located every 36th joint.

The pipeline has a maximum design capacity of 910,000 bbl/day and a maximum operating pressure of 1800 psia (124 barg).

== Oil production ==
Ninian Central acted as an oil reception and export hub for a number of installations in the northern North Sea. Ninian Central receives, or received, oil from the following installations:

- Ninian Northern (24" oil pipeline)
- Ninian Southern (24" oil pipeline)
- Strathspey (8" and 10" oil pipelines)
- Heather (16" oil pipeline)
- Magnus (24" oil pipeline)
- Alwyn (12" oil pipeline)
- Lyell (12" and 8" oil pipeline)

From the Ninian Central oil processing facilities crude oil flows to the crude oil booster pumps, a metering skid and Main Oil Line (MOL) pumps. After the MOL pumps the fluids were co-mingled with oil from the Strathspey, Ninian Northern, Heather and Magnus platforms.

Oil from the field is exported through the 36" pipeline to Sullom Voe (175 km).

The first oil was received at the Sullom Voe Terminal in December 1978.

== Owner and operator ==
The pipeline was initially operated by BP on behalf of the partner companies.

As of June 2021 the pipeline was operated by EnQuest on behalf of the owners:

- EnQuest Heather Limited (Operator) 18.0511%
- CNR International (UK) Ltd 63.3271%
- Chevron North Sea Ltd 2.2601%
- Total E&P UK Limited 16.3616%

== See also ==
Ninian Central Platform
