= ENQ =

ENQ may refer to:

- Enga language
- EnQuest, a British petroleum company
- Enquiry character, in telecommunications
