= Schiehallion oilfield =

Scottish oilfield in the North Sea

Schiehallion oil field
- Schiehallion Vessel 2004

- Location within North Sea
- Country: Scotland, United Kingdom
- Region: North Sea
- Offshore/onshore: offshore
- Coordinates: 60°20′N 4°20′W
- Operator: BP
- Partners: BP, Shell, Amerada Hess, Murphy Oil, Statoil, OMV

Field history
- Discovery: 1993
- Start of production: 1998

The Schiehallion oilfield is a deepwater offshore oilfield approximately 175 kilometres (95 nautical miles) west of the Shetland Islands in the North Atlantic Ocean. The Schiehallion and adjacent Loyal field were jointly developed by BP on behalf of the Schiehallion field partners; BP, Shell, Amerada Hess, Murphy Oil, Statoil and OMV, and the Loyal field partners; BP and Shell.

The Schiehallion field, together with Foinaven, Clair, Lancaster and Solan fields, forms the frontier area generally termed as the West of Shetland.

== Field development ==
Schiehallion field was discovered in 1993 by the semi-submersible drilling vessel Ocean Alliance while drilling the third exploration well in block 204 (well 204–3). The field is located in blocks 204/20 and 204/25 of the United Kingdom Continental Shelf in a water depth of 350 to 450 metres (1,150 to 1,480 ft). Recoverable oil reserves of Schiehallion are estimated to be between 450 and 600 million barrels (72×10^{6} and 95×10^{6} m^{3}). Schiehallion is named after a mountain in the highlands.

During 1994 and 1995 an appraisal of Schiehallion and Loyal was carried out, culminating in a successful extended well test, which demonstrated well rates of up to 20,000 barrels per day (3,200 m^{3}/d). The combined development of the Schiehallion and Loyal fields was sanctioned in April 1996 and the oil production started on 29 July 1998.

The design and construction of the Schiehallion FPSO vessel was contracted to the Atlantic Frontier Alliance, an ad hoc contracting consortium consisting of Harland and Wolff, SBM Offshore, and Brown and Root. The vessel was designed as a simple barge form, with a 245-metre (804 ft) length similar to a Suezmax tanker. The contract was placed in June 1995. The vessel was constructed at the Harland and Wolff shipyard in Belfast, and handed over to operator BP on 31 December 1997. The vessel has a dead-weight of 154,000 tonnes (152,000 long tons; 170,000 short tons), a processing capacity of 200,000 barrels per day (32,000 m^{3}/d), and a storage capacity of 900,000 barrels (140,000 m^{3}).

=== Process description ===
Oil and gas are produced from subsea wells via manifolds and rigid flowlines to a location underneath the vessel. From this point, flexible risers carry the production stream to the Schiehallion FPSO vessel. There are 42 subsea wells in total in five clusters with peak production rates of around 190,000 barrels per day (30,000 m^{3}/d).

Well fluid from the production swivels was routed to two parallel oil production trains. Fluid was first routed to a horizontal Slug Catcher vessel which allowed slugs of liquid formed in the flowlines to be retained and fed forward at a steady controlled rate. The oil from the Slug Catcher was heated and routed to the horizontal 3-phase (oil, gas and produced water) First Stage Separator. Gas from the Slug Catcher was also routed to the First Stage Separator but without heating. Separated oil from the First Stage Separator was further heated then routed to the horizontal 3-phase Second Stage Separator. From here oil was then transferred to an Electrostatic Coalescer where further produced water was removed from the oil stream. Oil from the Coalescer was cooled and transferred to the oil storage tanks. Gas from the First Stage Separator is routed to the high pressure (HP) compression and gas from the Second Stage Separator is routed to the low pressure (LP) compression. Produced water from the First Stage Separator flows to hydrocyclones where oil is removed prior to overboard disposal. Co-mingled produced water from the Second Stage Separator and Coalescer is pumped back to the inlet of the First Stage Separator. A test separator is also provided for well testing. Oil is routed to one of the Second Stage Separators and separated gas to the low pressure (LP) or high pressure (HP) compression trains. Vapour from both Train A and Train B Second Stage Separators was compressed in the common LP Compressor and mixed with vapour from the First Stage Separators. There were two further stages of compression in the HP First Stage Gas Compressor and the HP Second Stage Gas Compressor. Gas was cooled in the HP Second Stage Aftercooler and dehydrated by counter current contact with Glycol in the Glycol Contactor. From here a side stream of gas was taken for fuel gas to the power generators and for use as blanket, purge and pilot gas. The remaining gas was compressed in the HP Third Stage Gas Compressor, after cooling the gas was used for gas lift for the subsea wells. Some of the gas was further compressed in the HP Gas Injection Compressor and injected back into the reservoir via the gas injection well, or export by pipeline. There were also facilities for importing gas for use as fuel gas after heating and pressure reduction.

Oil is exported primarily to the Sullom Voe Terminal by the dynamically positioned shuttle tanker Loch Rannoch delivered in August 1998, and operated by BP Shipping.

Produced natural gas is partly used to power the vessel. The rest of the gas is exported through the West of Shetland pipeline to the Sullom Voe Terminal. Some of the exported gas is used as fuel in the Fortum operated Sullom Voe power station. The remainder is enriched with liquefied petroleum gas and exported to the Magnus platform for enhanced oil recovery in Magnus field.

=== Production Redevelopment ===
After more than a decade working in the harsh North Atlantic, the Schiehallion FPSO was in a poor condition, and required significant maintenance and repairs, which could only be performed in the summer season because of the hostile weather in the region. The increased water production was affecting the composition of the production fluids, and the FPSO processing system was becoming very constrained by the high water volume. As a consequence, Production was suspended at the start of 2013 to allow preparation for a £3 billion redevelopment of the greater Schiehallion field area. An FPSO, (the Glen Lyon), new seabed infrastructure and subsea technology will play a major part in the redevelopment of these fields, as will the use of a new enhanced oil recovery scheme. Due to come onstream in 2016, the redevelopment will extend production from the hub beyond 2035. The Schiehallion and Loyal fields have produced nearly 400 million barrels of oil since production started in 1998 and an estimated 450 million barrels of resource is still available, more than was originally thought. The Schiehallion FPSO was sold to a third-party and eventually sent to Alang shipbreaking yard in India, which is notorious for the unsafe disposal of vessels and materials related to the oil and gas industry.

The Glen Lyon began producing on 15 May 2017.

== See also ==
- List of oil and gas fields of the North Sea
