= Raymond Plank =

American businessman

Chairman of Apache Corporation

Raymond Plank (May 29, 1922 – November 8, 2018) was the founder and chairman of Apache Corporation. Under Plank’s leadership, Apache expanded its oil and gas operations internationally from a $250,000 capitalization to a market capitalization of over $30 billion. Plank invented the Master Limited Partnership and exposed corruption at Enron and within the energy merchant trading sector.

== Early life and education ==
Raymond Plank, the youngest of four siblings, was born in Minneapolis, Minnesota, to farmer and coal miner Raby Plank and Maude Ruth Howe Plank. His parents’ schooling was limited but they instilled in their children the value of education, and Plank dedicated himself to a lifetime of learning. His mother died of a blood clot after a routine appendectomy when Plank was fifteen.

Plank attended the Blake School in Minneapolis and credited his Latin instructor Noah Foss and other Blake teachers with providing the educational basis and academic discipline necessary for a successful life. Plank entered Yale University in September 1940 and after Pearl Harbor enlisted in the Army Air Corps Reserves. He was called to active duty in March 1943 and would not resume his university education until the end of the war. Plank graduated from Yale University in 1946 with a bachelor of arts degree.

== World War II service ==
After flight school, Plank was assigned to the 43rd Bomb Group, 64th Bomb Squadron, in the Pacific Theater of Operations as a B-24 bomber pilot. He completed 40 missions; three of his aircraft were so badly damaged in combat that they never flew again. On August 9, 1945, while based in the Okinawas, Plank took an unauthorized check flight to witness the mushroom cloud rising over Nagasaki.

== Apache Corporation ==
Upon graduation from Yale, Plank returned to his hometown of Minneapolis and with two partners formed Northwest Business Service, an accounting, tax and small business advisory firm. Through this enterprise, he became familiar with the types of investments then being offered in oil and gas exploration and production. Recognizing that investors’ interests in this field could be better served through a different concept, Plank and two childhood friends, Truman Anderson and Chuck Aranao, formed Apache Corporation in 1954 with $250,000 in investor capital. Apache offered its first oil and gas investment program in 1956.

Apache initially diversified beyond oil and gas into commercial real estate, purchasing office towers and shopping centers in Minnesota and Wisconsin. Apache’s real estate business achieved only minimal success, and when Oklahoma and Texas cut oil production allowables by as much as 90 percent in the late 1950s, the company sold off its real estate holdings and began acquiring successful entrepreneurial businesses including small telephone companies, an auto parts chain, the tree crop business and aerosol can and plastic pipe companies.

Conflict in the Middle East, the rise of OPEC and America’s increasing dependence on foreign oil led Plank to revise Apache’s strategy once again in the late 1960s and early 1970s. The company gradually divested its non-energy holdings and by the late 1980s was focused exclusively on oil and gas. Apache funded much of its early growth through the creation of drilling funds, investment programs that provided significant tax advantages to unit holders.

To provide its unit holders greater liquidity, in 1971 Apache formed Apache Exploration Company (Apexco) as the oil and gas operating arm of its drilling programs. Apexco was innovative in that it provided the first-ever vehicle for program participants to exchange their illiquid units for publicly traded stock. In 1981, under Plank’s leadership, Apache created Apache Petroleum Company (APC), the nation’s first Master Limited Partnership (MLP). This new investment vehicle consolidated interests in 33 Apache oil and gas programs formed between 1959 and 1978. APC units were traded on the New York and Midwest Stock Exchanges, providing liquidity to unit holders while preserving the tax advantages of their original limited partnership interests.

The Tax Reform Act of 1986 spelled the end of Apache’s drilling programs by reducing top marginal tax rates to the lowest levels since 1917, thereby undercutting the attractiveness of Apache’s drilling programs to high-income taxpayers. Apache offered its unit holders the opportunity to exchange their APC units for shares of Apache common stock.

Over the next two decades, Apache grew rapidly by buying and exploiting property packages from the majors and extending its reach internationally, acquiring concessions in Egypt, Western Australia, China, the United Kingdom North Sea, Poland and Argentina. The company became one of the nation’s leading independent oil and gas concerns.

== After Apache ==
Upon retiring as Chairman of Apache Corporation in January 2009, Plank dedicated his time to charitable work on behalf of Fund for Teachers, Ucross Foundation and to completing and publishing his memoirs, A Small Difference, in 2012. Proceeds from book sales support Fund for Teachers, the public foundation he founded in 2001.

== Personal life ==
Plank was married three times. His first wife was Sally Stevens, with whom he had five children, Katherine, Michael, Pamela, Roger and Dana (Roger followed in his father’s footsteps at Apache, where he was named president and chief corporate officer (CCO) in 2011 before retiring in 2014). Raymond Plank’s subsequent marriages were to Lollie Benz and Heather Burgess, with whom he had a sixth child, Raby.

== Philanthropy and social/political involvement ==
Plank was the founder and former Chairman of the Board of the Ucross Foundation, which provides visual artists, writers and composers with a setting for individual creative work, reflection and innovation on a 20,000-acre working ranch in northeastern Wyoming. Some of the works supported by Ucross include: The Shipping News by Annie Proulx, Eat, Pray, Love by Elizabeth Gilbert, The Light in the Piazza with music and lyrics by Adam Guettel, and The Grapes of Wrath composed by Ricky Ian Gordon.

In the 1990s, in recognition of the strong, lasting and positive influence that teachers had on his life, Plank started a program in his hometown of Minneapolis to provide teachers opportunities for summer sabbaticals, self-designed programs of learning and exploration. He endowed the program with $1 million. That pilot program has since grown into a public foundation called Fund for Teachers. In Egypt, where Apache is a leading oil and gas producer, thousands of young girls are getting their first opportunity for formal education in 201 one-room school buildings constructed by Springboard – Educating the Future, a U.S.-based nonprofit organization established by Plank.

Plank also established the Raymond Plank Professorship of Global Energy Policy at Harvard’s John F. Kennedy School of Government. He served as chairman of the Wyoming Futures Project and co-chairman of Minnesota Wellspring, was a founding member of Freedom Lift and Friends of Mesa Verde, and a member of the Denver Art Museum board of trustees. Plank has been a trustee of Carleton College, where Apache established the Raymond Plank Chair in Incentive Economics, and is past chairman of the University of Minnesota Foundation. He also was a trustee of the Northrop Collegiate School, member of the advisory board of Augsburg College, and founder of the Plank Institute at The Blake School, all in Minneapolis. Plank was a founding member of Stakeholders in America, the American Energy Assurance Council, and Energy Security Policy.

== Awards ==
In 2014, Plank was named the Houston Technology Center’s Entrepreneur of the Year. He also received the St. Paul Newspaper Guild’s Man of the Year; the National Royalty Owners Association Energy Leader of the Year in 1995; Minnesota Entrepreneur of the Year; Wyoming Man of the Year; and National Jewish Hospital (Minnesota) Man of the Year. Plank was selected CEO of the Year on three occasions by The Wall Street Transcript and was listed among Hart Publications’ 100 Most Influential People of the Petroleum Century. In 2009 Plank received the Award of Distinction from the University of Oklahoma’s Jeannine Rainbolt College of Education.

== Death ==
Plank died on November 8, 2018, at the age of 96.
