= Scott Lithgow =

- Company type: Private
- Industry: Shipbuilding
- Founded: 1967
- Defunct: 1993
- Fate: Merged into British Shipbuilders (1977); Acquired by Trafalgar House (1984)
- Headquarters: Port Glasgow and Greenock, Scotland
- Parent: British Shipbuilders (1977-1983); Trafalgar House (1983-1993)
- Subsidiaries: Scotts Shipbuilding and Engineering Company; Lithgows; Greenock Dockyard Company; Ferguson Shipbuilders

Scott Lithgow, Limited was a Scottish shipbuilding company.

== History ==
The company was formed in 1967 by the merger of Scotts Shipbuilding and Engineering Company and Lithgows. Scott Lithgow was based in Port Glasgow and Greenock on the lower Clyde in Scotland. Scott Lithgow was nationalised and subsumed into British Shipbuilders in 1977. Reorganisation of Scott Lithgow in 1981 saw all the assets of its subsidiary companies transferred under the direct operational control of Scott Lithgow.

From 1980, the company became the centre of British Shipbuilders’ Offshore Division and it was hoped that the offshore semi-submersible market would lead the yard back to profitability. However the Ocean Alliance semi-submersible construction was a disastrous contract for the company, with the rig eventually delivered four years late and at a loss of over £200 million.

In 1984 Trafalgar House bought the company and it ceased to trade in 1993.

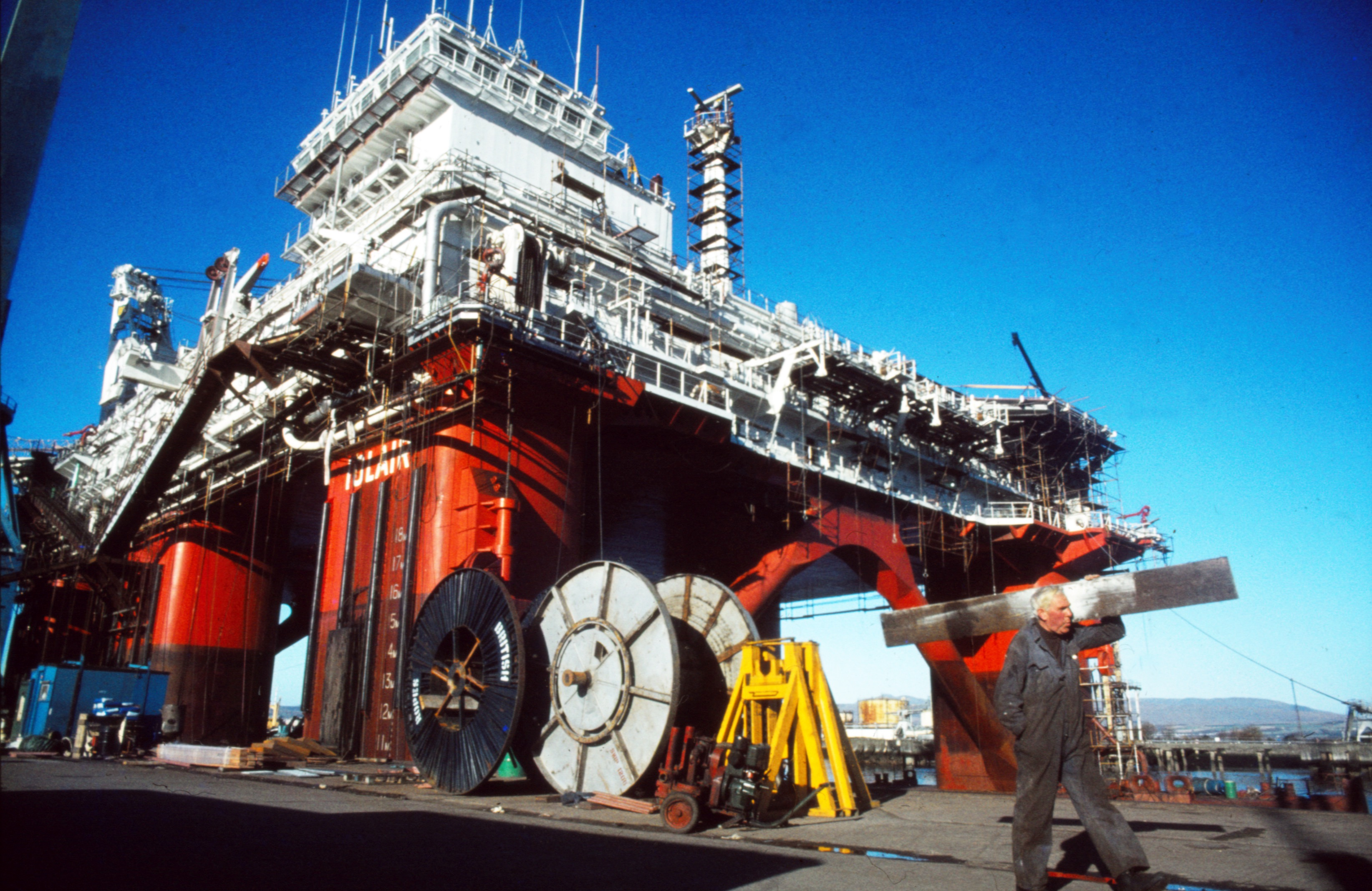
Iolair being fitted out in 1982

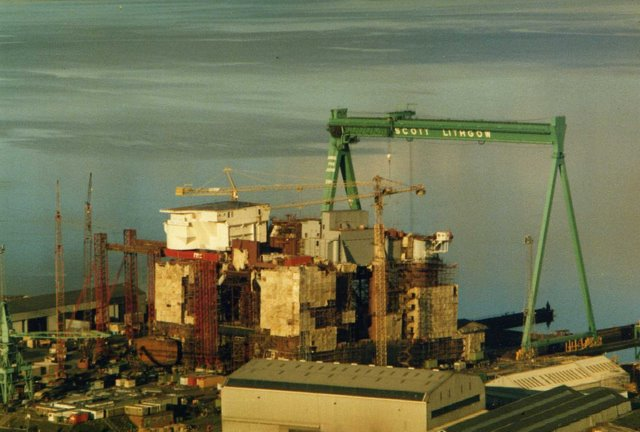
Ocean Alliance under construction in 1986
