= APA Corporation =

American energy company

- Type: Public
- Traded as: Nasdaq: APA; S&P 500 component
- ISIN: US03743Q1085
- Industry: Petroleum industry
- Founded: December 6, 1954; 71 years ago
- Founders: Truman Anderson; Charles Arnao; Raymond Plank
- Headquarters: Westchase District; Houston, Texas, U.S.
- Key people: John J. Christmann IV (CEO)
- Products: Petroleum; Natural gas
- Production output: 464.3 thousand barrels of oil equivalent (2,841,000 GJ) per day (2025)
- Revenue: ▼US$9.220 billion (2025)
- Operating income: ▲US$2.791 billion (2025)
- Net income: ▲US$1.434 billion (2025)
- Total assets: ▼US$17.761 billion (2025)
- Total equity: ▲US$6.093 billion (2025)
- Number of employees: 1,791 (2025)
- Subsidiaries: Apache Corp. Cordillera Energy Partners
- Website: apacorp.com

APA Corporation, a holding company for Apache Corporation, is an American company engaged in hydrocarbon exploration. It is organized in Delaware and headquartered in Houston.

As of December 31, 2025, the company had 1,056 million barrels of oil equivalent (6.46×10^{9} GJ) of estimated proved reserves, of which 74% was in the United States (primarily in the Permian Basin), 17% was in the Libyan Desert in Egypt, 2% was in the Forties oilfield in the North Sea, and 7% was offshore of Suriname. The company's proved reserves were 48% petroleum, 23% natural gas liquids, and 29% natural gas.

In 2026, the company is ranked 438th on the Fortune 500 and 1239th on the Forbes Global 2000. The company ranks as the 98th-largest fossil fuel producer by historical greenhouse gas emissions, having emitted 2,193 MtCO₂e, accounting for 0.10% of total global emissions.

== History ==
The Apache Oil Corporation was founded in 1954, in Minneapolis, Minnesota, by Truman Anderson, Raymond Plank and Charles Arnao with $250,000 in funding. Its first wells were drilled in 1955, in the Cushing field, between Tulsa and Oklahoma City.

In 1960, the company acquired interests in the Foshay Tower, a Minneapolis landmark. The 32-story imitation of the Washington Monument, became the company's headquarters from the early 1960s until 1984. The Fagerness #1 oil well was drilled in 1967, yielding the company's first major discovery. In 1969, APA became a public company via an initial public offering.

APA diversified into agriculture with the acquisition of the S&J Ranch in California, in 1970. The ranch produced citrus fruit, figs, pistachios, olives, and almonds. It was sold in 1987 to Castle & Cooke.

In 1971, the company formed Apache Exploration Company (subsequently "Apexco") as its oil and gas operating company, which it sold in 1977, with its non-petroleum holdings, including the ranch, and reinvested into a farm-in agreement with GHK to operate its wells in the Anadarko Basin.

In 1981, the company created Apache Petroleum Company (APC), the first public master limited partnership in the United States.

APA moved its headquarters from Minneapolis to Denver in 1987. The company again moved its headquarters, in 1992, to Houston, Texas.

It acquired a non-operating interest, via a participation in a Royal Dutch Shell joint venture, in operations in the Gulf Of Mexico in 1980. The company acquired oil and gas wells in eight states from David Holdings for $200 million in 1985. In 1986, APA acquired oil and gas assets in the Gulf of Mexico from Occidental Petroleum. It doubled its reserves in 1991, by acquiring assets from Amoco, including a position in the Permian Basin of West Texas, for $515 million and 2 million shares of the company. In 1993, the company acquired Hadson Energy Resources for $58 million, expanding its assets to offshore Western Australia.

APA began operations in Egypt in 1994, by acquiring a 25% non-operated interest in the Qarun Concession, operated by the Phoenix Resource Companies. Production began in December 1995. In 1995, the company acquired Dekalb Energy Canada, marking the company's return to Canada, for $285 million in stock. APA also acquired 315 oil and gas fields in 1995, located in the Permian Basin, the Texas-Louisiana Gulf Coast, western Oklahoma, East Texas, the Rocky Mountains and the Gulf of Mexico from Texaco.

In 1996, the company acquired Phoenix Resources and took over operations of the Qarun Concession in Egypt. It acquired fields and leases in the Gulf of Mexico from Royal Dutch Shell for $715 million in cash, plus 1 million shares of stock, in 1999.

In 2001, the company acquired operations in the Libyan Desert of Egypt from Repsol for $410 million, drilling its first deep-water wells in the West Mediterranean Concession of offshore Egypt the following year.

In 2002, the company drilled its first deep-water wells in the West Mediterranean Concession of offshore Egypt. APA and ExxonMobil completed a series of agreements that provided for transfers and joint ventures across a broad range of properties in Western Canad iIn May 2005. That October, the company sold its 55% stake in the deep-water section of Egypt's concession for $413 million to Hess Corporation.

In 2003, the company acquired the Forties oilfield, the largest field ever discovered in the United Kingdom North Sea as well as assets in the Gulf of Mexico from BP for $1.3 billion.

The company acquired Gulf of Mexico Shelf properties from BP in April 2006.

In June 2006, APA sold its oil production interest in China to Australia-based Roc Oil Company for US$260 million.

In 2007, a test horizontal well at the Van Gogh project, in Exmouth Gulf, Western Australia, produced 9,694 barrels per day. The company started production from the Van Gogh development offshore Western Australia in February 2010.

In June 2008, the natural gas pipeline explosion at the company's processing hub on Varanus Island led to the 2008 Western Australian gas crisis. The Australian government was forced to drop charges as a result of a technicality. The company sold its assets in Australia in 2015.

The company acquired assets in the Gulf of Mexico from Devon Energy for $1.05 billion, in June 2010.

In August 2010, the company acquired assets from BP in Texas, southeast New Mexico, western Canada, and Egypt for $7 billion.

The company acquired Mariner Energy for $2.7 billion in November 2010.

In 2011, the company discovered eight oil wells in Egypt's Faghur Basin. It sold a non-controlling one-third share of its Egyptian assets to Sinopec in November 2013.

In January 2012, the company acquired assets in the Beryl field in the North Sea from ExxonMobil. In May 2012, the company acquired Cordillera Energy Partners for $2.5 billion in cash and 6.3 million shares of common stock. The acquisition added approximately 71 million barrels of oil equivalent (430,000,000 GJ) to Apache's reserves and strengthened its position across western Oklahoma and the Texas Panhandle.

In June 2013, a pipeline in northern Alberta, Canada was noticed to have ruptured, spilling 60,000 barrels (9.5 million litres) of toxic waste in what was cited as one of the largest of such disasters in recent history in North America.

The company sold its assets in Western Australia for $2.1 billion in 2015, its interest in the Scottish Area Gas Evacuation pipeline in 2016, and its assets in Canada to Paramount Resources for C$459.5 million in 2017.

APA declared its "Alpine High" discovery to be a failure in 2020, despite its $3 billion investment. Steven Keenan, VP of global exploration and lead geologist on the play, resigned.

In January 2021, the company restructured its agreement with the Egyptian General Petroleum Corporation. The company reorganized its legal structure, with APA Corporation becoming the holding company for all of its subsidiaries in March 2021.

In February 2024, the company agreed to pay $4 million in civil penalties and undertake $5.5 million in projects to ensure 422 of its oil and gas well pads in New Mexico and Texas comply with state and federal clean air regulations after allegations by U.S regulators that the company failed to comply with federal and state requirements to capture and control air emissions from 23 of its oil and gas production operations in New Mexico and Texas.

In April 2024, the company acquired Callon Petroleum for $4.5 billion in stock.

In June 2025, the company sold its assets in New Mexico for $608 million.
