= Magnus oilfield =

UK oil field in the North Sea

Enquest Magnus oilfield
- Location within North Sea
- Country: Scotland, United Kingdom
- Region: North Sea
- Block: 211/12
- Offshore/onshore: Offshore
- Coordinates: 61°37′N 1°18′E
- Operator: EnQuest
- Partners: EnQuest

Field history
- Discovery: 1974
- Start of production: 1983

Production
- Current production of oil: 15,000−18,000 barrels per day (~−880,000 t/a)
- Current production of gas: 100×10^{6} cu ft/d (2.8×10^{6} m^{3}/d)
- Estimated oil in place: 1,540 million barrels (~2.10×10^{8} t)

The Magnus oilfield is a large oilfield in the United Kingdom's zone of North Sea. It is located 160 kilometres (99 mi) north-east of the Shetland Islands. The field is located mainly in Block 211/12a. Resources are estimated to total 1.54 billion barrels (245×10^{6} m^{3}) of oil, of which 869 million barrels (138.2×10^{6} m^{3}) are recoverable reserves.

== History ==
The Magnus oilfield was discovered in March 1974 by BP. The discovery was made 2,709 metres (8,888 ft) below the seabed in the younger sands of the Late Jurassic by the semi-submersible drilling rig Sedco 703. Similarly to several other fields in the area, the field was named after the Viking saint–Magnus of Orkney. It was announced on 24 January 2017 that BP will sell a 25% share of the field and turn over the operatorship to EnQuest.

Fabrication of the Magnus structure began in 1981 at Highland Fabricators' yard at Nigg Bay in the Cromarty Firth. The jacket of the Magnus platform was installed in 1982, with the main oil export pipeline to the Ninian Central Platform, and the Northern Leg Gas Pipeline to Brent A completed shortly afterwards. First oil from the field was achieved in August 1983.

In May 1996, the production started at the South Magnus field.

The enhanced oil recovery project was proposed in 2000. It was implemented in 2003.

== Reserves ==
Magnus field's reserves are estimated to contain 1.54 billion barrels (245×10^{6} m^{3}) of oil, of which 869 million barrels (138.2×10^{6} m^{3}) are recoverable reserves.

== Technical description ==
The field is developed by a single central combined drilling and production platform. The Magnus jacket is the largest single piece steel structure in the North Sea. It was designed, manufactured and installed by John Brown Offshore. The original system also included seven subsea producing wells which were later turned around to water injection duty.

The topsides for Magnus were designed by Matthew Hall Engineering which was also responsible for procurement, project management, construction management, offshore installation services and commissioning assistance. They were awarded the contract in December 1978. Initially there were facilities for 17 oil production wells, five water injection wells, and nine spare slots. The production capacity was 140,000 barrels of oil per day and 2.5 million standard cubic metres of gas per day. There are two production trains each with two stages of separation with the first stage operating at a pressure of 28 barg. Natural gas liquids were extracted from the gas stream using a turbo-expander/re-compressor system. Electricity generation was powered by three 27 MW GE Frame 5 gas turbines. All the gas compressors were driven by electric motors, not by gas turbines. The topside accommodation was for 200 people. There were 19 topside modules and the topsides weight was 31,000 tonnes.

The produced oil is transported by a 91-kilometre (57 mi) long 24-inch (610 mm) pipeline to the Ninian Central platform, and further to the Sullom Voe Terminal. Produced natural gas from Magnus, together with gas from the Thistle and Murchison fields, is transported by a 79-kilometre (49 mi) long 20-inch (510 mm) pipeline to Brent A and further through the FLAGS to St Fergus in Aberdeenshire.

== Enhanced oil recovery project ==
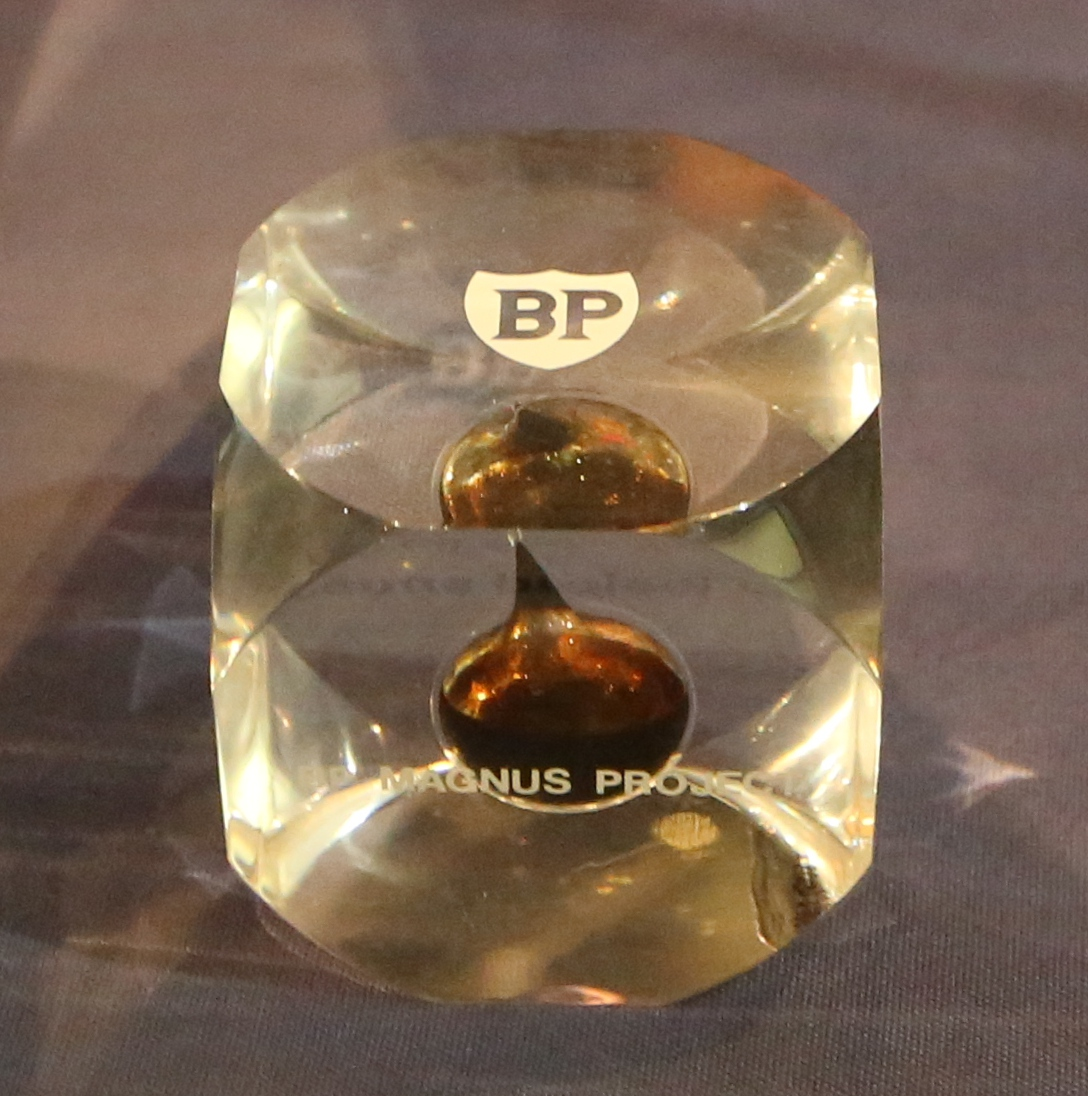
A commemorative cube produced by BP containing a sample of oil from the Magnus oilfield

To increase the recoverable oil from the field and to extend the field life, an enhanced oil recovery (EOR) project was implemented. The EOR project involved importing gas from the two West of Shetland fields Foinaven and Schiehallion to the Sullom Voe terminal where liquefied petroleum gas is added to natural gas. This gas stream is then transported by another pipeline to the Magnus platform where it is reinjected into the Magnus reservoir to aid pressure support and increased oil recovery. It is expected to increase the recoverable oil reserves by 50 million barrels (7.9×10^{6} m^{3}) and extend the field life to beyond 2015. The project cost around £320 million.
