= Heerema =

Heerema is a surname. Notable people with the surname include:

- Edward Heerema (born 1947), Dutch engineer and businessman
- Jeff Heerema (born 1980), Canadian ice hockey player
- Pieter Heerema (born 1951), Dutch sailor
- Rudmer Heerema (born 1978), Dutch politician

== See also ==
- Heerema Marine Contractors, Dutch company
