= Sea Quest (drilling rig) =

The Sea Quest was a semi-submersible drilling rig. She discovered the UK's first North Sea oil on 14 September 1969 in the Arbroath Field. She also discovered the first giant oil field named Forties on 7 October 1970.

The Sea Quest was built by Belfast shipbuilders Harland & Wolff for BP at a cost of £3.5 million and launched on 8 January 1966. The entire structure was 320 feet (98 m) high and weighed 150,000 tons, including three legs each 35 feet (11 m) in diameter and 160 feet (49 m) long that could be partially filled with water to control the height of the platform above the sea.

In 1977, Sea Quest was sold to Sedco (now part of Transocean) and renamed Sedco 135C. She was towed to the west coast of Africa. On 17 January 1980, while drilling in the Warri area, Nigeria, a blowout occurred and the rig sustained extensive fire damage. The rig was then deliberately sunk in deep water.
