= Sullom Voe Terminal =

Oil and Gas terminal

Coordinates: 60°28′N 1°16.5′W

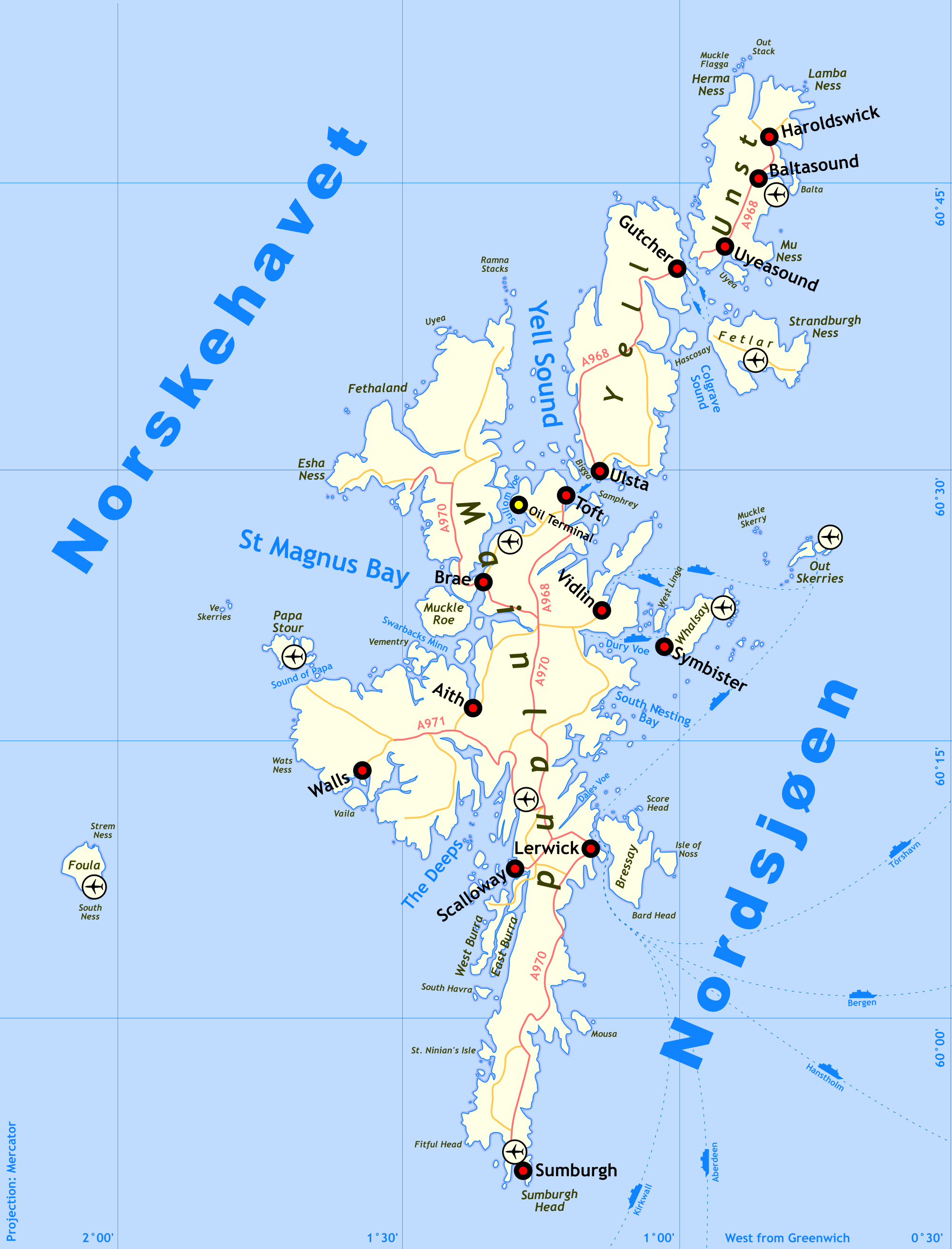
Sullom Voe terminal location in the Shetland Islands.

The Sullom Voe Terminal (Shaetlan pronunciation: [ˈsuɫəm voː] SOO-ləm-voh) is an oil and gas terminal at Sullom Voe in the Shetland Islands of Scotland. It handles production from oilfields in the North Sea and East Shetland Basin and stores oil before it is transported by tanker.

== Construction ==
When Shetland was identified as a location to provide pipeline terminal and support facilities for offshore oil installations in the northern North Sea, corporations involved had expected to each build their own terminal facilities. However, wishing to minimize the negative impacts of the industry, the Shetland Islands Council, with power granted to it by the UK Parliament in the 1974 Zetland County Council Act, was able to contain all pipeline terminal facilities at the Sullom Voe site.

Sullom Voe Terminal was built between 1975 and 1981. 6,000 people were employed during construction. They were housed in temporary accommodation, including the former car ferry TEV Rangatira.

The first oil was received at 18:40 on 25 November 1978 via the Brent pipeline. At 12:30 on 3 December 1978, the first oil from the Ninian pipeline was received. The Scatsta Airport to the south re-opened in 1978 to support the building of the terminal.

The terminal was officially opened on Saturday 9 May 1981 by Queen Elizabeth II. A bomb was detonated at the power station on the terminal at 12.05pm on the day of the ceremony which was attributed to the IRA by Connor McCarthy. A boiler was damaged but no-one was injured. Despite the bombing the ceremony continued, concluding with the Queen dining aboard Rangatira that evening.

== Operation ==
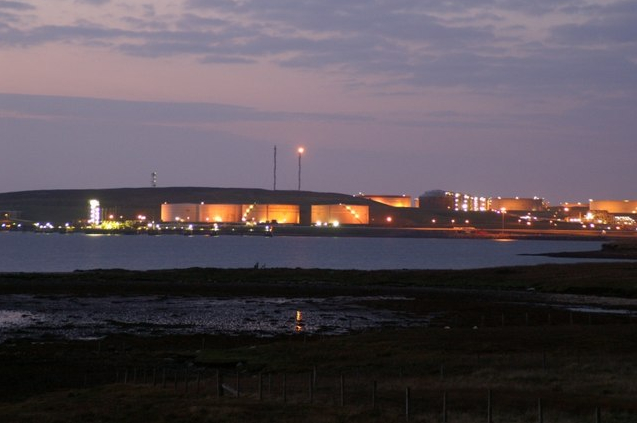
Sullom Voe oil terminal at dusk

Sullom Voe Terminal has been owned since its construction by the Ninian and Brent partners. On 1 December 2017 the plant transitioned from long term operator BP to EnQuest. The terminal receives oil through the Brent (TAQA Bratani) and Ninian (EnQuest) pipeline systems. Oil from the Schiehallion oilfield and Foinaven oilfield has been received by the purpose-built Loch Rannoch shuttle tanker since August 1998.

In the late 1990s, at the height of North Sea oil, the terminal handled over a quarter of UK petroleum production and around 500 people worked there. Around half are EnQuest workers. A new 22 inches (560 mm) pipeline was laid from the Clair oilfield in 2003–2004, and first oil from the Clair field was received in February 2005. 7 billion barrels (abt 960 million tons) of oil through the SVT achieved in December 2001. By 2008, the terminal had handled almost 8 billion barrels (about 1.1 billion metric tons) of oil. Gas is imported through the West of Shetland pipeline. Some of the gas is used as fuel in the ENGIE operated Sullom Voe power station. The remainder is enriched with LPGs and exported to the Magnus platform for enhanced oil recovery. Due to its isolated position, the site has its own fire brigade.

On 3 May 2018 it was reported that both the Brent and Ninian pipelines had to be shut down, halting production from the connecting fields in the East of Shetland basin. The pipelines were shut down due to a "minor fault" found during a routine inspection. The minor fault was reportedly a small oily-water leak in a pipeline. Late on 6 May, EnQuest announced that repair work had been completed, and both the Brent and Ninian pipelines were reopened.

On 25 November 2018 the Sullom Voe Terminal reached a milestone 40th anniversary of the first oil production.

=== Throughput ===
The throughput of the terminal over the period 1981 to 1990 (in 1000 barrels per day)

The total throughput of the terminal up to the end of 1997 was 821,773,000 tonnes.

Throughput over the period 1998 to 2021 (in 1,000 tonnes)

=== Sullom Voe power station ===
The gas turbine power station provides electricity for around 43% of the Shetland Islands (since the early 1990s) and the other half comes from the (fuel oil-powered) Lerwick Power Station situated at Gremista. Shetland requires about 50 MWe in the winter. From May 2004 to May 2014 it was operated by the Finnish company Fortum; previous to that it was operated by BP. Since May 2014 it has been operated by Cofely Limited, a GDF SUEZ company. The 100 MWe plant has four 25 MW General Electric Frame 5 gas turbines and is part of a CHP system being built in the late 1970s. The actual power output from the plant is around 80 MWe as each turbine runs at about 18 MW. When the oil terminal was at the height of its production, 70 MWe would be used from five gas turbines by the plant, but less is needed now. It employs around twenty people.

== Shetland Gas Plant ==
Sullom Voe is adjacent to the TotalEnergies operated gas facility Shetland Gas Plant, completed in 2014.

== See also ==
- Yell Sound
- The Shetland Experience, a documentary film about the construction of the terminal
- Flotta oil terminal
- Teesside oil terminal
- Shetland Gas Plant
