= Forties pipeline system =

North Sea pipeline network

Location
- Country: United Kingdom
- Direction: east–west
- Start: Forties Charlie platform
- Passes through: North Sea
- To: Cruden Bay

General information
- Type: Crude oil
- Owner: Ineos
- Operator: Ineos
- Construction started: 1975; 51 years ago

Technical information
- Length: 169 km (105 mi)
- Maximum discharge: 0.7 million barrels per day (~3.5×10^{7} t/a)
- Diameter: 36 in (914 mm)

The Forties pipeline system (FPS) is a major pipeline transport network in the North Sea. It is owned and operated by Ineos and carries 30% of the UK's oil, or about 550 thousand barrels per day (87×10^{3} m^{3}/d) of oil per day, to shore. It carries liquids production from 85 fields in the North Sea and several Norwegian fields on behalf of around 40 companies. The system has a capacity of 575,000 barrels of oil a day.

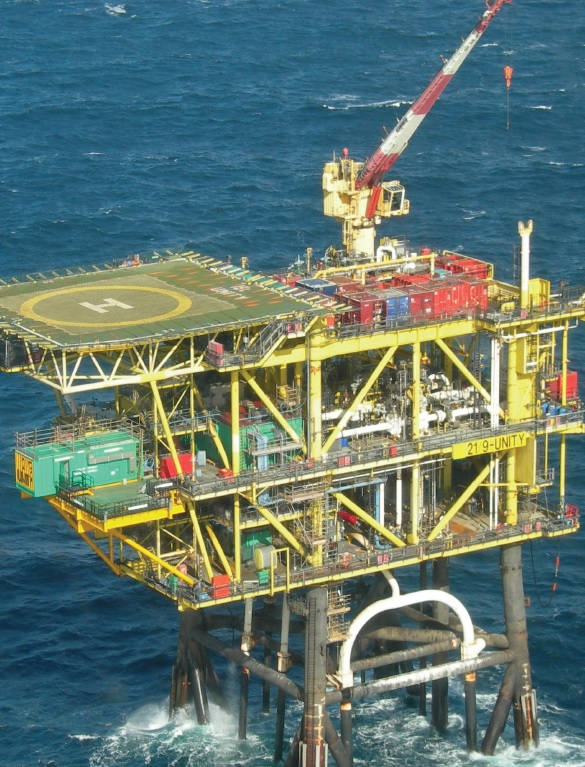
The riser platform Forties Unity

FPS consists of a 36-inch (910 mm) pipeline originating at APA Corporation's Forties Charlie platform. The pipeline carries crude oil 169 kilometres (105 mi), routing through the Forties Unity riser platform, to the terminal at Cruden Bay. From there unstabilised crude is co-mingled with natural gas condensate from the St Fergus terminal and pumped to the processing facility at Kinneil, Grangemouth. The onshore pipeline has three intermediate pumping stations at Netherley, Brechin and Balbeggie.

== History ==
The original 32-inch pipeline was opened in 1975 to transport oil from the Forties Oil Field, the UK’s first major offshore oil field. The Forties Unity installation was installed in 1992 including new 36-inch pipelines. The 32-inch pipeline was abandoned in situ.

It was formerly owned and operated by BP, which retained the asset after selling the Forties Oil Field to APA Corporation in 2003.

In April 2017, BP agreed to sell the pipeline to Ineos for a $125 million upfront payment and an additional $125 million in possible earnouts over 7 years.

FPS was out of service from 11 December 2017 due to a crack found the prior week, and returned to full capacity on 30 December 2017.

== Throughput ==
Early oil production from the Forties field (in 1000 barrels)

The cumulative throughput of crude oil through the Forties system up to the end of 1997 552,146,000 tonnes.

Recent throughput (in 1000 tonnes)
