= Central Area Transmission System =

CATS pipeline

Location
- Country: North Sea, United Kingdom
- Direction: north-south-west, 210°
- Start: CATS Riser Platform (Block 22/10a) bridge linked to North Everest
- Passes through: Central North Sea
- To: CATS processing terminal in Teesside, England

General information
- Type: Natural gas
- Partners: BlackRock and GIC (via Kellas Midstream Limited), Eni, Harbour Energy
- Operator: Kellas Midstream Limited
- Commissioned: 1993

Technical information
- Length: 404 km (251 mi)
- Maximum discharge: 1.7 billion standard cubic feet per day
- Diameter: 36 in (914 mm)

CATS Terminal
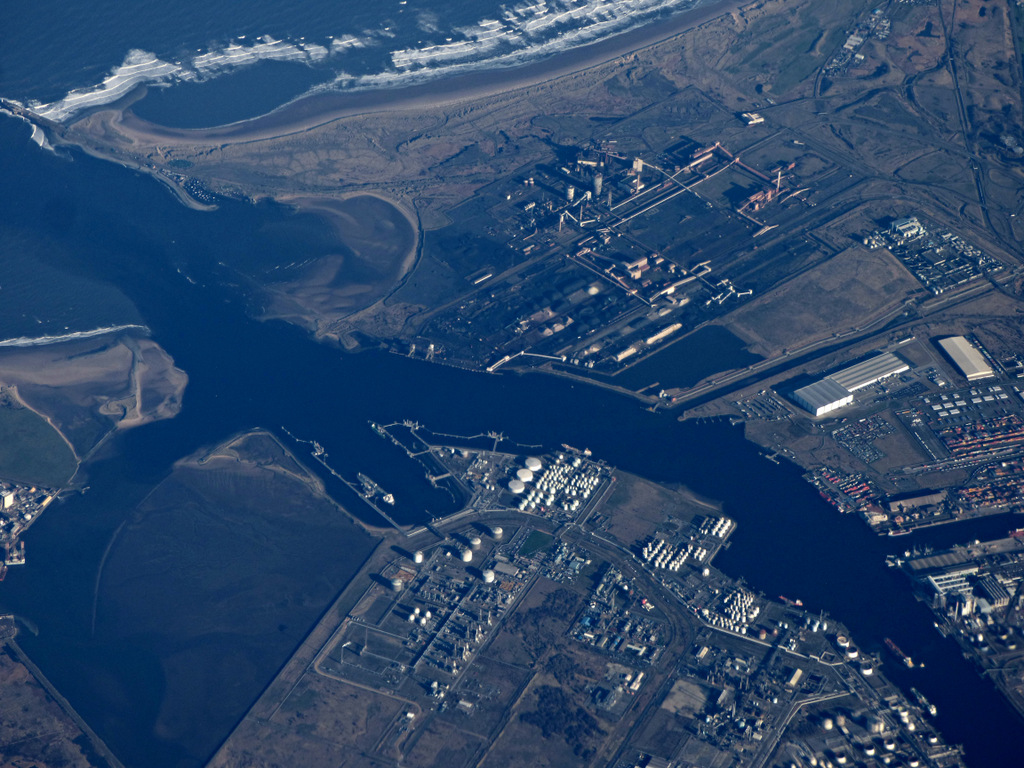
- The Central Area Transmission System terminal is located in the middle of the Seal Sands Petrochemical Complex, seen here from the air

- Location within County Durham

General information
- Type: Gas terminal
- Location: Seal Sands, Middlesbrough, TS2 1UB
- Coordinates: 54.6123°N 1.1951°W
- Elevation: 5 m (16 ft)
- Inaugurated: May 1993
- Owner: BlackRock/GIC

Technical details
- Floor area: 70 acres (280,000 m^{2})

The Central Area Transmission System (known as CATS) is a natural gas transportation and processing system that transports natural gas through a 404 kilometre pipeline from the Central North Sea to a reception and processing terminal at Teesside in the North East of England.

== History ==
Plans for the site began from the discovery of BP's Lomond field in May 1972. In addition, other fields were discovered in the Central Graben Area of the North Sea.

The receiving terminal site for the system was built between 1990 and 1993. It was originally operated by Amoco. The CATS pipeline was completed in 1993, receiving gas from two of Amoco's fields: Everest and Lomond, now owned by Chrysaor.

Together with the development of the Everest and Lomond fields, the project, which included the construction of an offshore riser platform and pipeline, was one of the largest construction projects ever undertaken in the UK, second only to the Channel Tunnel at that time.

Due to increased demand within the Central North Sea, the decision was taken to provide a processing service to future users of the CATS pipeline, enabling delivery of their gas into the National Transmission System. This required the construction of a pipeline reception and gas treatment facility, and the CATS gas and liquids processing plant, comprising two processing trains, each with the capacity to handle around 17 million standard cubic metres of gas per day. The first of the new trains went into operation four months ahead of schedule in May 1997, and the second train was commissioned in 1998.

In July 2007, the CATS pipeline was damaged by the anchor of the vessel 'Young Lady'. The pipeline was shut-in for two months.

In 2023, CATS celebrated 30 years of operation since gas was first received at the terminal on 12 May 1993.

== Route ==
The 36-inch diameter pipeline runs from the CATS riser platform, which is located in Block 22/10a of the Central North Sea, 230 kilometres (140 mi) east of Aberdeen, to Teesside in England. The pipeline reaches the shore at Coatham Sands near Redcar where there is a Beach Valve Station, remotely operated from the CATS terminal. The pipeline is routed under the River Tees for 5-mile (8.0 km) to the gas terminal.

The CATS pipeline was originally conceived to carry natural gas from the Everest and Lomond fields and was built oversized to accommodate future production from fields in the surrounding area. The CATS pipeline now transports gas from over 30 producing fields including J-block, MONARB, ETAP, Erskine, Armada, Andrew, Huntington, Banff, Stella, Culzean and Everest. Customers can connect directly to CATS at any one of six connection points along the pipeline (known as 'tees'), at the riser platform, or via one of nine hubs.

== Technical description ==
The CATS riser platform gathers natural gas from a number of fields. The incoming gas from Everest and other fields connected by separate pipelines including Armada, Lomond and Erskine, is aggregated on the riser platform. From the riser platform, the gas is transported via the CATS pipeline, a 404 kilometre long natural gas subsea pipeline. The pipeline has a diameter of 36 inches (910 mm) and the capacity to handle up to 1.7 billion standard cubic feet of natural gas per day (48 million standard cubic metres per day). The outside of the pipe is coated in concrete which gives added protection and also ensures that it remains on the seabed while the gas is in transit. The inside of the pipe is lined with an epoxy film, which reduces friction and corrosion, thus maximising its capacity and prolonging the life of the pipeline.

The CATS pipeline fluid specifications for entry and redelivery are as follows.

Gas specification for CATS pipeline
Parameter	CATS inlet	CATS redelivery
Temperature	51 °C max	1 °C to 38 °C
Pressure		7,000 kPa gauge
Water dew point	-26 °C at 7,500 kPa	<-10 °C at 7,000 kPa
Hydrocarbon dew point	-2 °C at 10,340 kPa	-2 °C at 7,000 kPa
Water content	15 kg / million m^{3}	
Hydrogen sulphide	3 ppm vol max	3.3 ppm vol max
Carbonyl sulphide	1 ppm vol max	
Methyl Ethyl Mercaptan sulphur	0.5 ppm vol max	
Total Mercaptan sulphur	3.1 ppm vol max	
Total sulphur	14.4 ppm vol	15 pmm vol max
Carbon dioxide	2.8 mol %	2.9 mol % max
Oxygen	9 ppm vol	10.0 ppm vol max
Nitrogen	4.5 mol %	5.0 mol %
Mercury	0.01 g / m^{3}	
Non hydrocarbon content	5.5 mol %	
Wobbe Index		48.14 to 51.41 MJ/SCM
Gross calorific value		36.9 to 42.3 MJ/SCM

== Ownership ==
BlackRock and GIC are the majority owners of CATS (99%)

Other partners with equity in CATS are Eni (0.3388 per cent) and Harbour Energy (0.6630 per cent).

BlackRock and GIC own their 99% stake in CATS via Kellas Midstream Limited, which is accountable for the strategy, operational and financial performance, along with growing the business. Kellas Midstream Limited owns CATS North Sea Limited, the Operator of CATS under the CATS Parties Joint Venture.

CATS North Sea Limited appointed Wood as its operating partner, introducing a novel operating model focused on a long-term strategic relationship. Wood provides the resources to manage day-to-day operation of the CATS terminal and pipeline.

Harbour Energy, as operator of the North Everest platform, is duty holder of the CATS riser platform. The North Everest platform is bridge-linked to the CATS riser platform.

== CATS Terminal ==
The Central Area Transmission System Terminal is the reception and processing facility for the CATS pipeline.

It is located in Teesmouth (54°36’43”N, 1°11’45”W) at Seal Sands (borough of Stockton on Tees) on the North Sea coast, and occupies a 29-hectare site. It is situated in the middle of Teesmouth's petrochemical area, between an oil terminal to the north, and a chemical works and the former Teesside Oil Refinery (to the south).

The facility processes the gas through processing trains that ensure that its quality meets the requirements for entry to the National Transmission System (NTS). Natural Gas Liquids (NGLs) are removed and the processed natural gas is fiscally metered before leaving the terminal and being fed directly into the NTS. The NGLs are then separated into propane, butane and condensate.

In 2024, CATS delivered 7.3 billion cubic metres of gas to UK markets, representing around a quarter of UK gas production.

=== Gas processing ===
The CATS gas terminal has the capacity to process about 34 million standard cubic metres of natural gas a day in two parallel processing trains.

The pipeline reception and gas treatment facilities comprise:

- Inlet reception – pig receiver, slug catcher and filter. From the inlet reception fluids flow to the CATS or to the TGPP terminal.
- Gas treating – mercury removal and hydrogen sulphide H_{2}S/mercury treaters
- Dewpoint control units – Joule-Thomson valve chilling then into separator vessel, gas is metered prior to export, liquid passes through a H_{2}S removal vessel prior to metering and export
- Gas dehydration (2 trains) – counter current contact with tri-ethylene glycol (TEG) facility which includes a TEG cold finger regeneration system
- Cold separation – dehydrated gas undergoes Joule-Thomson valve cooling then flows to a low temperature separator, gas from the separator is heated and metered prior to export to the National Transmission System (NTS), liquid from the separator passes to the stabiliser column
- Stabilization and compression – stabilizer overhead vapour (methane and ethane) is compressed and is routed to NTS, liquid from the stabilizer flows to the depropanizer
- Fractionation – depropanizer overhead vapour (propane) is cooled, passes through a H_{2}S removal vessel, and is metered prior to sale as propane, the bottom product from the depropanizer is routed to the debutanizer, overhead product from the debutanizer (butane) is cooled, metered and sold as butane, bottom product from the debutanizer is cooled, metered and sold as natural gas liquids (NGL).

The propane and butane are produced to the following specification.

Propane and Butane specification
Specification	Propane	Butane
Dewpoint	<-40 °C at 1.013 bara	483 <-30 °C at 1.013 bara
Vapour pressure	1434 kPa gauge max	483 kPa gauge max
Propane	95 % min	0.5 % max
Iso- & n-Butane	2.5 % max	95 % min
Ethane	2.0 % max	0.1 % max
Pentanes	0.1 % max	1.5 % max
Olefins	1.0 % max	1.0 % max
Nitrogen	0.1 % max	0.1 % max
Carbon dioxide	0.1 % max	0.1 % max
Hydrogen sulphide	1 ppmv max	1 ppmv max
Mercury	10 ppb w max	10 ppb w max
Pressure	19 barg max	10.5 barg max
Temperature	33 °C max	33 °C max

Propane and butane are supplied to Norsea. Gasoline (C5+) is supplied to Navigator and Sabic.

=== Distribution ===
The purified natural gas is metered and enters the National Transmission System at an above ground installation (54°36’37”N, 1°11’48”W) in the south-west corner of the terminal site. The four-mile (6 km) spur of Feeder Main FM06 transports gas to a pigging and pressure reduction station at Cowpen Bewley in Stockton-on-Tees, where gas is delivered into the Regional Transmission System, there are also connections to the 24-inch Feeder Main FM06 from Little Burdon to Billingham and into the 42-inch Feeder Main FM13 from Cowpen Bewley to Bishop Auckland.

The site has two tall chimneys and one taller flare stack.

The site belongs to the Teesmouth Industry and Wildlife Partnership.

=== Gas processing (CNS/CATS) ===
The CATS processing train uses turbo-expanders to reduce the temperature of the gas to remove natural gas liquids. CATS gas is first dehydrated with TEG to remove water. The gas is routed to two turbo-expanders in series which chills the gas and condenses out the natural gas liquids, the product is mainly methane. NGL goes to the deethanizer fractionation column which removes ethane, this is mixed with the methane and is supplied to the National Transmission System. The NTS access point is the above ground installation (54°36’37”N, 1°11’48”W) on the CATS terminal site. NGLs from the deethanizer goes successively to a depropanizer and debutanizer which produce Propane and Butane and natural gasoline. The petroleum products are then transferred by pipeline either to liquid storage or to other petrochemical businesses based on Teesside for use as feedstock.

=== Gas processing (SNS) ===
The Southern North Sea pipeline reception and gas treatment facilities include the following.

A pig receiver and slug catcher. Vapour from the slug catcher is cooled and chilled in a gas-to-gas heat exchanger, then by a refrigerant system, and a Joule-Thomson pressure reduction valve before the, now two-phase, mixture passes to a separator. Gas is warmed in the gas-to-gas exchanger and flows through a filter and flow meter and is routed to the National Transmission System.

Liquid from the cold separator is routed to a condensate separator which separates the liquid into monoethylene glycol MEG, which passes to the rich MEG storage tank, and condensate which flows to the 1st stage condensate separator which also receives liquids from the slug catcher. Gas from the 1st stage separator passes to the flash gas compressor, MEG is routed to the rich MEG tank, and condensate is heated and flows to the 2nd stage condensate separator. Gas from the 2nd stage separator passes to the flash gas compressor, and liquid is pumped through a mercury removal bed to the condensate surge drum.

MEG from the rich MEG storage tank is routed though the MEG regeneration plant where water is stripped out. MEG flows to the lean MEG storage tank from where it is pumped to the Breagh Alpha platform via a 3-inch pipeline piggybacked with the 20-inch gas line.

The NGLs from all the plants are transported by pipeline to petrochemical companies in the Teesmouth area. Condensate is pumped to Sabic for use as a feedstock or to a tanker loading facility. The propane and butane goes to the Phillips Norsea plant, and the condensate goes to Sabic North Tees on the former ICI site at Wilton and to the Tees Storage site owned by Vopak in Seal Sands.

== See also ==
- Everest gas field
- List of oil and gas fields in the North Sea
- Eastern Trough Area Project
- Teesside oil terminal
