= Forties oil field =

Largest North Sea oil field

Forties Oil Field
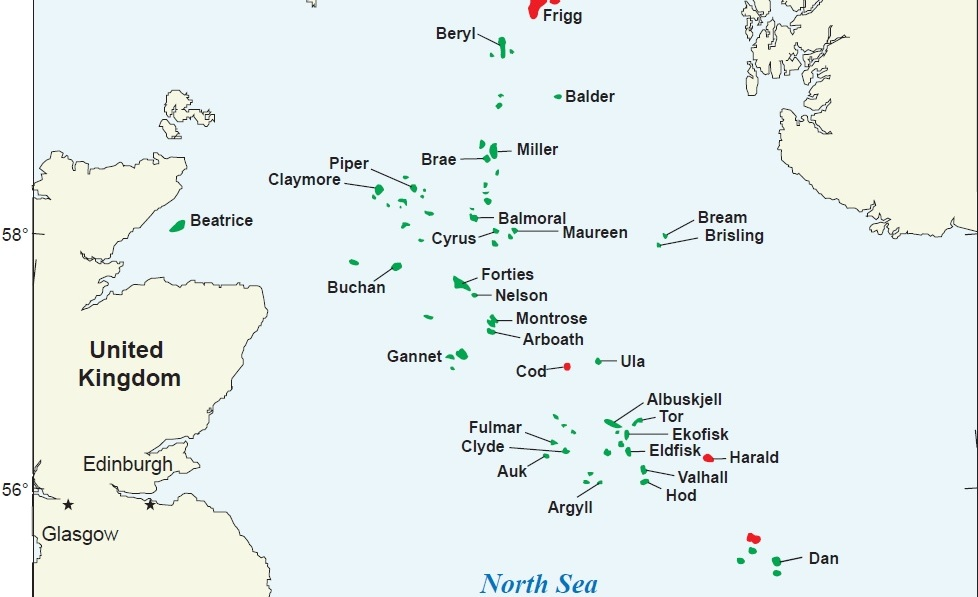
- North Sea Oil Fields

- Location within North Sea
- Country: Scotland, United Kingdom
- Region: North Sea
- Offshore/onshore: offshore
- Coordinates: 57.716667°N 1.016667°E
- Operator: APA Corporation

Field history
- Discovery: 7 October 1970
- Start of production: 1975
- Peak year: 1979

Production
- Current production of oil: 10,000 barrels per day (~5.0×10^{5} t/a)
- Year of current production of oil: 2025
- Current production of gas: 10×10^{6} cu ft/d (280×10^{3} m^{3}/d)
- Year of current production of gas: 2013
- Estimated oil in place: 5,000 million barrels (~6.8×10^{8} t)

The Forties Oil Field is the second largest oil field in the North Sea, after the Clair oilfield, which is located 110 miles east of Aberdeen. It was discovered in 1970 and first produced oil in 1975 under ownership of British Petroleum, now called BP.

== History ==
BP had made the announcement to the press on 7 October 1970, that oil had been struck 110 miles (180 km) east-northeast of Aberdeen in 350 feet (110 m) of water. Production is from the Paleocene Forties Formation sandstones over a 90 km^{2} area making it a "giant oil field". BP's semi-submersible drilling rig Sea Quest hit crude oil at 11,000 feet (3,400 m) in the Upper Tertiary sandstone.

Four appraisal wells drilled during 1971–1972 revealed a large reservoir at a depth of about 7,000 feet (2,100 m) and closure of 155 m. So marked the first and largest major oil field discovery in the United Kingdom sector of the North Sea. Oil had previously been discovered at the Ekofisk field.

== Reservoir ==
The Forties Formation consists of a lower Shale Member and an upper Sandstone Member, which were deposited in a "middle and lower submarine fan environment". The initial development plan included a "complete replacement seawater injection system" starting in 1975. By the time BP sold the field in 2003, their reservoir engineers estimated the oil in place was 4.2 billion barrels (670 million cubic metres).

== Development ==
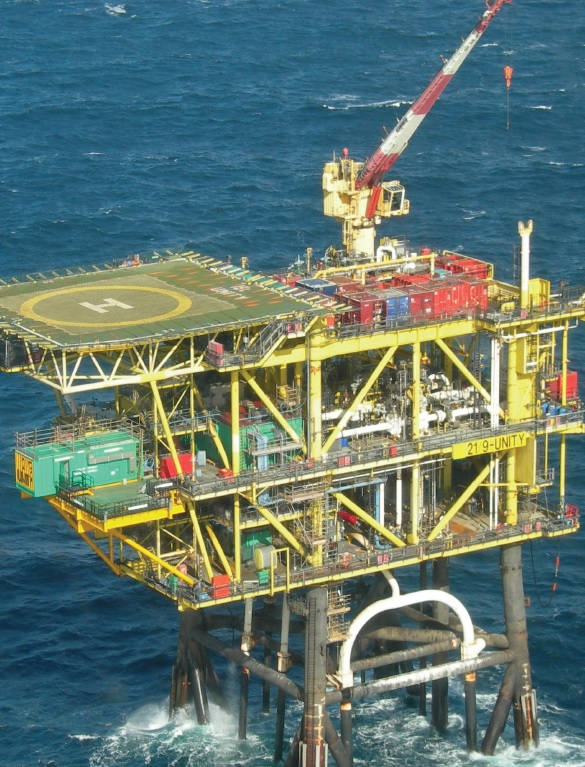
The riser platform Forties Unity

There are five fixed platforms around the field: Forties Alpha, Forties Bravo, Forties Charlie, Forties Delta and Forties Echo. A riser platform, Forties Unity, lies further to the west and remained owned by BP as a strategic asset for accessing the Forties pipeline system without being dependent on the older access point, Forties Charlie. In April 2017, BP agreed to sell the pipeline to Ineos for a $125 million upfront payment and an additional $125 million in possible earnouts over 7 years.

In the late 1970s and early 1980s, BP was ubiquitous in the North Sea, owning or partnering with other firms to own the best and biggest fields in the North Sea. BP owned their own commercial deepsea diving company, Subsea International, which serviced their structures and pipelines as well as others worldwide. BP contracted a fleet of helicopters, including Sikorsky S-61s from Bristow Helicopters used for crew changes on their platforms. The North Sea is typically too rough to make personnel transfers from a crewboat to a rig by basket or ladder, resulting in all crew changes being made by helicopter. North Sea crews typically worked two weeks on, two weeks off. Crews would often wait a day to a week to land on their platform, due to frequent dense fog which prevented landing on the 'Foggy Forties', a hazardous act even in clear weather. BP owned buildings near the airports around the North Sea to accommodate the crews while they were waiting or sometimes stranded in the Shetland Islands en route to the rigs from Aberdeen, Scotland.

The topsides for the Forties Echo and the associated fluid reception facilities on Forties Alpha were designed by Matthew Hall Engineering which was also responsible for procurement, fabrication, installation, hook-up and commissioning assistance. It was awarded the contract in August 1984. Initially there were facilities for 14 oil wells, and two spare slots. Construction details are shown in the following table.

Forties installations – construction
Platform	Fabrication contractor	Site	Installation date
Forties Alpha	Laing Offshore	Teesside	June 1974
Forties Bravo	Laing Offshore	Teesside	June 1975
Forties Charlie	Highlands Fabricators	Nigg Bay	August 1974
Forties Delta	Highlands Fabricators	Nigg Bay	June 1975
Forties Echo	Highlands Fabricators	Nigg Bay	July 1986
Forties Unity			

No fluid processing was undertaken on Forties Echo, well fluids were transferred to Forties Alpha to yield 67,000 barrels of oil per day and 300,000 standard cubic metres of gas per day. Electric power was supplied from Forties Alpha and Delta. There is a 20 berth accommodation although the installation was intended to be unmanned. There are two modules with a topsides weight of 5,400 tonnes.

== Production history ==
Named Forties because it lay just off the Long Forties Bank, the field began producing oil in September 1975 and officially inaugurated by Queen Elizabeth II on 3 November 1975. When the project completed, 400,000 barrels of crude initially expected to be siphoned off each day and exported through a 36-inch pipeline to landfall at Cruden Bay north of Aberdeen. At peak production, this single field would provide the nation with about one-fifth of its total annual requirements by 1978.

Production (in 1000s barrels)

Production from the field peaked in 1979 at 500 thousand barrels per day (79 thousand cubic metres per day), well above early predictions.

The Forties field produced 41,704 barrels of oil and 10million cubic feet of associated gas per day as of November 2013. It was the second highest producing field in the UK, after the Buzzard field. Production declined to 20,000 barrels of oil per day in 2021. In 2025 production declined to 10,000 barrels per day.{{citation needed}}

== Renewal by Apache ==
The importance of the field has made it a status symbol in the North Sea. When BP sold its 96% share in the field for $812 million in 2003, some traditionalists likened it to selling off the family silver.

APA Corporation, which bought the field, immediately initiated an intensive re-evaluation of the field and found a further 800 million barrels (130 million cubic metres), extending the field's life by at least twenty years, making the investment very profitable. The field has been in production for 45 years but there appears to be no sign that it is nearing the end of its commercial life. The field was originally scheduled to be retired in 2013, Apache expected that the production life of the field could be extended through further investment.
