= Harding oilfield =

Scottish oil field in the North Sea

- Location within North Sea
- Country: United Kingdom
- Region: North Sea
- Block: 9/23B
- Coordinates: 59°15′N 1°30′E
- Operator: TAQA
- Partners: TotalEnergies

Field history
- Discovery: 1987
- Start of production: 1996
- Peak year: 1999

Production
- Current production of oil: 10,000 barrels per day (~5.0×10^{5} t/a)
- Year of current production of oil: 2017
- Current production of gas: 2.5×10^{6} cu ft/d (71×10^{3} m^{3}/d)
- Peak of production (oil): 100,000 barrels per day (~5.0×10^{6} t/a)
- Producing formations: Eocene formation

The Harding oilfield is a small oil field operated by TAQA, in the North Sea block 9/23b, approximately 200 miles (320 km) North-East of Aberdeen and in 110 metres (360 ft) of water.

== Discovery and development ==
The field was discovered in 1987, when oil was found in Eocene at a depth of 1,850 metres (6,070 ft). It was originally named the Forth field, but was renamed in 1993 in memory of David Harding who was Chief Executive of BP Exploration's UK operations during the field appraisal. The abundance of naphthenic acid in the oil however made the development unattractive at the time. The crude is heavy and naphthenic and is generally of a lower value compared to other North Sea oils. Consequently, the decision was made to export it by tanker rather than co-mingle it in a pipeline. The oil from the Harding field is therefore stored offshore. The selected development solution was a heavy-duty steel jack-up production unit based on a proprietary design by Technip Geoproduction resting on a concrete gravity base which had storage for 550,000 barrels (87,000 m^{3}) of oil.

== Reservoir ==
The Harding field is in fact composed of five separate reservoirs. The largest is the central field, hosting most of the wells as well as the site of the gas re-injection. There is also smaller fields to the North, North-East, South and South-East, all named as such. This has led to a unique well naming system in addition to the traditional use of DTI well numbers and slot numbers, which identifies a well by the particular field in which it has been drilled and its purpose.

The formations are unconsolidated, making the wells likely to produce sand. In order to prevent this, traditional cased hole completions are not used on any of the Harding wells. Instead, all wells used sandscreens.

== Production ==
Harding presently (2017) produces around 10 thousand barrels per day (1.6×10^{3} m^{3}/d) of oil, from 15 wells, and 2.5 million cubic feet per day (71×10^{3} m^{3}/d) of gas, most of which is re-injected. All production wells are gas lifted. The central reservoir is supported by two water injection wells and a gas injector. The south and north fields have the support of one water injector each, though the injector in the north field is currently suspended.

Well fluids are processed in the 2-phase (liquid and gas) 1st Stage Separator. The separated liquids flow to the 3-phase (oil, gas and water) 2nd Stage Separator. After metering the oil stream is either directed to the oil storage tanks and thence to a tanker or to the Harding Oil Pipeline. Vapour from the 2nd Stage Separator is compressed in the LP Compressor and mixed with the vapour from the 1st Stage Separator and is transferred to the gas system. There is also a Test Separator for well testing. Oil flows to the inlet of the 1st Stage Separator, and vapour to the gas system.

All produced water is reinjected. In addition there are two aquifer wells to provide extra injection water, if required.

Without a pipeline, the bulk of the produced gas has been reinjected into the cap of the central reservoir, sequestering it for production after 2021, when the platform is converted to a gas producer after decline of oil production.

== Harding Area Gas Project ==
The Harding reservoir also contains gas, which TAQA hopes to develop at some future stage. BP announced plans in 2006 to develop the gas resources via the Harding Area Gas Project. A combination of factors has made this original development concept uncompetitive; particularly low gas prices and increased development costs. The project is being recycled and in 2018 TAQA was in discussion with its then partner, Maersk Oil, to investigate alternative development options for the gas resources in the area.
