= Clair oilfield =

Scottish offshore oil field

- Location within North Sea
- Country: Scotland
- Region: Scottish Territorial Waters
- Location: West of Shetland
- Block: 206/7; 206/8; 206/9; 206/12; 206/15
- Offshore/onshore: offshore
- Coordinates: 60°45′N 2°24′W
- Operator: BP
- Partners: BP; ConocoPhillips; Chevron Corporation; Royal Dutch Shell; Amerada Hess

Field history
- Discovery: 1977; 49 years ago
- Start of development: 2001; 25 years ago
- Start of production: 2005; 21 years ago

Production
- Estimated oil in place: 8,000 million barrels (~1.1×10^{9} t)
- Producing formations: Devonian to Carboniferous continental sandstone

The Clair oilfield is an offshore oil field in Scottish territorial waters 75 kilometres (47 mi) west of Shetland in water depths of up to 140 metres (460 ft). The field is the largest oilfield on the UK Continental Shelf with an estimated 8 billion barrels of oil-in-place, according to the BP Plc's website. It extends over an area of some 220 square kilometres (85 sq mi), covering five licence blocks.

== History ==
The Clair reservoir was discovered in 1977, with exploration well #206/8-1a penetrating a 568-metre (1,864 ft) oil column in a thick sequence of Devonian to Carboniferous continental sandstone. In the 1980s ten appraisal wells were drilled. This activity demonstrated that the structure extended to an area of some 400 square kilometres (150 sq mi) with static oil-in-place, although it failed to confirm the presence of economically recoverable reserves. Two further wells were drilled in 1991, two in 1992 and one in 1995. Two of these wells (206/8-8 and 206/8-9z) demonstrated the potential for commercial flow rates but were not produced for long enough to give confidence in long term reservoir deliverability.

In 1996 there was a breakthrough in the drilling and extended well testing (EWT) of well #206/8-10z. The EWT was followed by the side-tracking of an offset well into the pressure sink created by the EWT. The 1996 well test results set the scope for the 1997 drilling programme and triggered interest in a first phase of development. Two further wells were drilled in 1997 to appraise the 'Graben' and '3A' segments to reduce uncertainty in these areas adjacent to the core area.

In May 1997 it was agreed by the Clair partners to jointly develop the field. BP was appointed as the operator and programme coordinator. A development plan was approved in 2001, representing an investment of £650m by BP and its four partners in the project – ConocoPhilips, Chevron, Enterprise, and Amerada Hess. The production facilities were installed in 2004. The first stage of the development was inaugurated on February 23, 2005.

== Development ==
The first phase of development targets the 'Core', 'Graben' and 'Horst' segments of the southern area of the reservoir, which have 1.75 billion barrels (278×10^{6} m^{3}), of which 250 million barrels (40×10^{6} m^{3}) can be recovered. The development plan includes drilling of 15 producing wells, eight water injectors and one drill cuttings re-injection well. Plateau production is expected to be 60,000 bbl/d (9,500 m^{3}/d) of oil and 20 million cubic feet per day (570×10^{3} m^{3}/d) of gas.

Noble Corporation and Wood subsidiary Mustang Engineering, part of the Wood Group, won the contract for Front-end loading. They proposed a single steel jacket with an integrated topsides deck with processing facilities, accommodation and a separate modular drilling rig. The steel jacket for Clair is located over the existing 206/8-10z well. The jacket is a four-legged single steel structure with a height of approximately 165 metres (541 ft). At its base, the jacket measures 45 by 50 metres (148 by 164 ft), has a height of 169 metres (554 ft), and a total weight of 8,800 tons. Both jacket and topsides are designed for fabrication, transportation and installation as single fully integrated lifts (maximum 10,500t) that require access to the heaviest lift capability vessels on the installation market. BP awarded the contract for the fabrication of the platform jacket to Aker Verdal.

The contract for the construction of the platform topsides was awarded to AMEC. There are additional processing facilities for offshore power generation, water injection, produced water and cuttings re-injection, surplus gas disposal (export or re-injection) and flare gas recovery. Artificial lift is provided for all producing wells with the option of Electric Submersible Pumps (ESPs) for future well intervention. The operations will feature simultaneous drilling and coil tubing well intervention operations (SIMOPS). The topsides deck (including the flare boom) weighs 10,700 tonnes.

Well fluids are first treated in two parallel separation trains. After heating the well fluids are separated into three phases (oil, gas and produced water) in the two parallel High Pressure (HP) Separators. Oil from the HP Separators is further heated and passes to the two parallel 3-phase Low Pressure (LP) Separators. Oil then flows to the two parallel Electrostatic Coalescers which further separates water from the oil streams. The oil is cooled and flows to the oil export pumps, then through the oil metering skid and to the oil export pipeline. Although there are two separation trains there is only one common gas compression train. Gas from the LP separators is compressed in the vapour recovery unit and mixed with the gas from the HP separators. The combined stream is compressed in the LP and then the MP (medium pressure) compressors. Gas is dehydrated by counter-current contact with glycol in the Glycol Contactor. The dry gas stream is used as fuel gas on the platform. The remaining gas is further compressed in the HP compressor, it is used as gas lift on the oil production wells or, after gas metering, is exported via the export pipeline. Produced water from the separation train is treated and flows to the water injection wellheads.

The contract to build the accommodation modules was awarded to Leirvik Module Technology. The accommodation contract involves the fabrication of the living quarters and utility building which have a weight of 1000 tonnes. The contract for the drill rig fabrication contract was awarded to Heerema Hartlepool. The scope of the fabrication work incorporates fabrication of a Derrick Equipment Set (DES) module, with substructure and skid base and a Drilling Support Module (DSM). The work includes equipment installation and extended commissioning and the modules weigh approximately 2000t and 2400t respectively. The entire structure has a design life of 25 years.

A further development phase, called 'Clair Ridge', aims to develop other areas of the field with further fixed platforms. The field contains an estimated 8 billion barrels of oil, with an estimated 120,000 barrels per day production at peak levels.

The UK government approved the £4.5billion Clair Ridge development in October 2011 and production is scheduled to begin in 2016 and continue until 2050. The project involves the construction of a drilling & production platform bridge-linked to a living quarters & utilities platform, with pipelines to transport the oil and gas produced to Sullom Voe Terminal. BP and its partners awarded AMEC the contract for the engineering and project management for the main platform design, with Kværner constructing the platform jackets and Hyundai Heavy Industries constructing the topsides. Subsea 7 fabricated and installed the pipelines, Alphastrut designed and supplied a weight-saving aluminium raised access flooring and ceiling cable containment system, Gordon Engineering designed and manufactured the helicopter refuelling system and Bifab fabricated the flare boom. External blast walls, fire walls and blast rated HVAC ductwork system were designed and fabricated by MTE (Mech-Tool Engineering Limited)

In June 2013, the Clair Ridge platform jackets left Kværner's Verdal Yard in Norway and they were successfully installed in August 2013. First oil was announced on November 23, 2018.

In March 2013 BP announced that the partnership will begin a two-year appraisal program to explore a third phase of Clair field development. A contract was awarded to Aker Solutions in November 2018 for engineering services associated with this project which is now known as Clair South.

== Partners ==
The Clair Partnership comprises four partners with the following fixed equity interests:

- BP – 45.1%
- ConocoPhillips – 7.5%
- Chevron Corporation – 19.4%
- Royal Dutch Shell – 28% (including 9.3% interest obtained from Hess in a swap in 2009)

In July 2018, BP increased its stake to 45.1% by acquiring a 16.5% interest from ConocoPhillips.

== See also ==
- Oil fields operated by BP
