= EnQuest =

British petroleum exploration and production company

EnQuest plc
- Type: Public limited company
- Traded as: LSE: ENQ,
- Industry: Oil and gas industry
- Founded: 6 April 2010
- Headquarters: London, England
- Key people: James Buckee (Chairman); Amjad Bseisu (CEO)
- Products: Petroleum exploration and production
- Revenue: ▼$1,118.3 million (2025)
- Operating income: ▲$648.8 million (2025)
- Net income: ▼$1.6 million (2025)
- Website: www.enquest.co.uk

EnQuest plc is an independent United Kingdom-based petroleum exploration and production company which operates mainly in the United Kingdom Continental Shelf. EnQuest shares are included on the main list of the London Stock Exchange and is a constituent of the FTSE 250 Index.

== History ==
The company was formed in April 2010 by a combination of the demerged British North Sea assets of Petrofac and Lundin Petroleum.

== Operations ==
The firm has interests in six oil fields located in the Northern North Sea, two of which (the West Don and Don Southwest fields) previously formed the Petrofac Energy Developments business unit and have a combined production of 40,000 barrels per day (6,400 m^{3}/d). The other four (Broom, Heather, Thistle and Deveron) were part-owned by Lundin Petroleum prior to the creation of EnQuest and are capable of producing 24,000 barrels per day (3,800 m^{3}/d). EnQuest is the operator of each field; its financial interests are as follows: In November, 2013, EnQuest were granted permission to develop the Kraken field which has an estimated 140 million barrels of oil.

Field	Working interest
Broom	63%
Don Southwest	60%
Heather	100%
Thistle and Deveron	99%
West Don	44.95%
Magnus	100%
