= United Kingdom Continental Shelf =

Offshore mineral rights area

The UK Continental Shelf (UKCS) is the region of waters surrounding the United Kingdom, in which the country has mineral rights. The UK continental shelf includes parts of the North Sea, the North Atlantic, the Irish Sea and the English Channel; the area includes large resources of oil and gas. The UK continental shelf is bordered by Norway, Denmark, Germany, the Netherlands, Belgium, France, and Ireland. A median line, setting out the domains of each of these nations, was established by mutual agreement between them: - see the Continental Shelf Act 1964.

Responsibility for the mineral rights of the UKCS rests with the Oil and Gas Authority part of Department for Business, Energy and Industrial Strategy (BEIS), which awards licences to oil companies to produce hydrocarbons from specific areas and regulates how much they can produce over what period.

The UKCS is divided into numbered rectangular Quadrants, each one degree of latitude by one degree of longitude. Each Quadrant is further subdivided into 30 numbered Blocks (each 10 minutes latitude by 12 minutes longitude, thus each Quadrant has 5 blocks East-West by 6 blocks North-South), as shown below.

Key to block numbers
1	2	3	4	5
6	7	8	9	10
11	12	13	14	15
16	17	18	19	20
21	22	23	24	25
26	27	28	29	30

This numbering system then forms the identification for a particular oil or gas development. For example, the Harding oilfield, which is located in a fairly northern position, is in Quadrant 9, Block 23, denoted "9/23" (9/23b specifically to differentiate it from the Gryphon oilfield). The numbering of Quadrants follows several series: 1-58 (the original North Sea sequence); 71-75, 82-89, 91-113 (south-west of the UK and bordering France and Ireland); 124-135, 137-144, 147-155, 157-166, 168-176 (the Atlantic west of Scotland); 204-225 (the North Sea north of Shetland and bordering Norway); 337-339, 341-349, 351-359 and 362-369 (the Atlantic west of the 124-176 sequence).

While the depth of the UK Continental Shelf varies significantly, the shallowness of the North Sea at an average depth of 95m has facilitated the development of offshore oil drilling and wind farms.
