= Commercial offshore diving =

Professional diving in support of the oil and gas industry

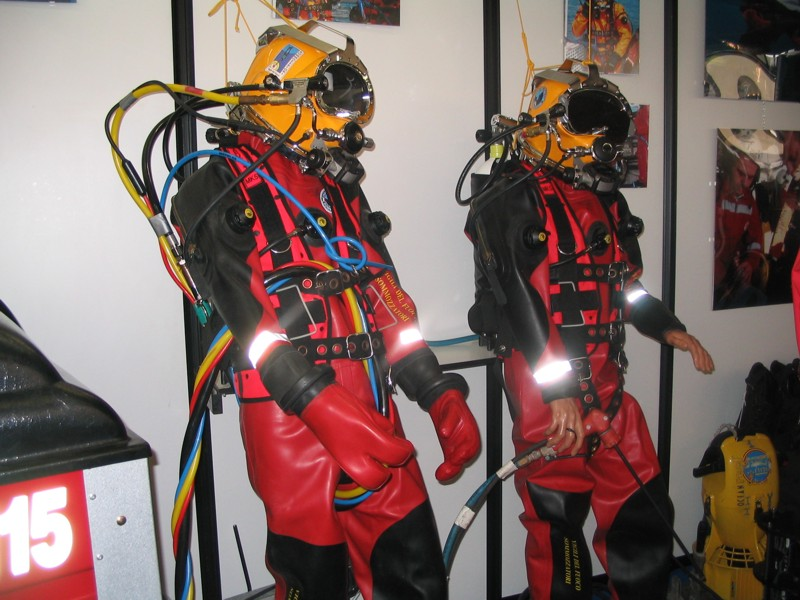
Surface supplied diving equipment on display

Commercial offshore diving, sometimes shortened to just offshore diving, generally refers to the branch of commercial diving, with divers working in support of the exploration and production sector of the oil and gas industry in places such as the Gulf of Mexico in the United States, the North Sea in the United Kingdom and Norway, and along the coast of Brazil. The work in this area of the industry includes maintenance of oil platforms and the building of underwater structures. In this context "offshore" implies that the diving work is done outside of national boundaries. Technically it also refers to any diving done in the international offshore waters outside of the territorial waters of a state, where national legislation does not apply. Most commercial offshore diving is in the Exclusive Economic Zone of a state, and much of it is outside the territorial waters. Offshore diving beyond the EEZ does also occur, and is often for scientific purposes.

Equipment used for commercial offshore diving tends to be surface supplied equipment but this varies according to the work and location. For instance, divers in the Gulf of Mexico may use wetsuits whilst North Sea divers need dry suits or even hot water suits because of the low temperature of the water.

Diving work in support of the offshore oil and gas industries is usually contract based.

Saturation diving is standard practice for bottom work at many of the deeper offshore sites, and allows more effective use of the diver's time while reducing the risk of decompression sickness. Surface oriented air diving is more usual in shallower water.

== Scope of work ==
The offshore diver may do a wide range of tasks in support of offshore drilling or production.

=== Drilling rig support ===
Much of the offshore seabed diving work is inspection, maintenance and repair of the blow-out preventers (BOPs) and their permanent guide bases. The primary functions of a blow-out preventer system are to confine well fluid to the wellbore, provide a way to add fluid to the wellbore and to allow controlled volumes of fluid to be withdrawn from the wellbore. Dive work includes assistance with guiding the blowout preventer stack (BOP stack) onto the guide base, inspection of the BOP stack, checking connections, troubleshooting malfunctions of the hydraulic, mechanical and electrical systems, and inspection of the rig's anchors.

=== Production platform support ===
There are a wide range of production platform configurations which are chosen to suit the water depth, expected sea conditions and other constraints. Diving work will depend on the details, but will generally involve inspection, maintenance and repair of the structure, wellheads, manifolds, risers, associated pipelines and mooring systems.

Divers may work on marine risers (conduits that extend a subsea oil well to a surface facility) and blowout prevention stacks on all production rig types if the depth is within diving range. Work may be surface oriented or in saturation depending on depth and duration.

Depths are relatively shallow on jack-up rigs, which stand on the seabed, and are limited to depths less than about 90m. Much of the diving may be on air. Diving work may include inspection of the seabed before jack-up, measurement of penetration depth of legs, monitoring and management of scour around the legs where they rest on the seabed, inspection and repair of underwater structural components of the rig and support of anchor deployment and recovery.

Semi-submersible platforms operate in a wider range of depths, mostly relatively deep, and bottom work is more likely to be in saturation and using heliox. There is also shallow work on the hull which is likely to be on air: inspection of thrusters, pontoons and the rest of the underwater structure of the rig and when necessary repair.

==== Wellheads ====
Wellheads control the production of oil or gas from the well, and can be used for water injection. They are mounted on production guide bases, which are the upper endpoint of the well casing at the seabed. A well head can be directly connected to a subsea manifold or indirectly via other wellheads, which may be arranged in groups called a subsea template. Most diving work on wellheads and manifolds is installation and maintenance.

==== Manifolds ====
Subsea manifolds are structures mounted on the seabed where pipelines and connections to wellheads are connected to control the flow of product from the wells to their next destination. They will include valves and control mechanisms for the valves, and diving work mostly involves inspection and maintenance work, but can also include installation and repair, and connecting in new wellheads.

=== Pipeline work ===
A large amount of offshore diving work is associated with submarine pipeline work, particularly with pipeline connections, inspection and repair. Depths may range from deep to shallow, and procedures and diving mode will be chosen to suit. Work includes aspects of pipe laying and trenching, and work on existing pipelines and ancillary equipment.

==== Pipelay barges ====
Simplified drawings of three common systems used for the construction and installation of subsea pipelines (not to scale): S-lay, J-lay and reel.

A pipelay barge, or lay barge, is used to lay submarine pipelines by welding pipe sections to the pipeline on board, inspecting and coating the joint, and lowering the assembled part to the seabed over a projecting supporting structure called a stinger which guides the pipe and controls the curve at the end of the barge (overbend) in a more or less continuous process. As the pipe approaches the seabed, the pipe takes a convex-downward curve (the sagbend) before making contact with the bottom. the sagbend is controlled by tension applied from the vessel and tension wires from the pipeline on the bottom to anchors which prevent it from being dragged out of position by the barge.

Diving work on lay barges includes shallow inspection and maintenance work on the stinger, and deeper work at the bottom associated with the pipe and pipeline connections. Shallow work is usually on air, and may include stinger inspection, Checks that the pipeline runs smoothly and is not damaged before leaving the stinger, placing and checking CCTV cameras for monitoring the pipe transit, operating manual valves on the stinger buoyancy system and work on the mooring system. Deep work will use breathing gas appropriate to the depth, and may include checking the as-laid condition of the pipe and coating, grout bagging long spans for support, connection of flanges, bolt tensioning and hyperbaric welding, attachment, operation and removal of pigging equipment, and attachment, removal and moving of constant tension wires.

==== Pipeline stabilisation ====
There are several ways that a pipeline can be stabilised on the seabed, and diver intervention is required on most of them. Concrete mattresses are used to weigh down the pipeline to hold it in place, particularly on bends, but may also be laid under the pipe to stabilise the substrate. Frond mattresses are mainly used to stabilise the sand, and are usually anchored to the bottom. Sandbags and gravel help prevent scour, and can be used to support areas where the pipe spans a local depression. Trenching protects the pipeline from current and external loads such as from iceberg gouging, trawl nets and anchors, and saddles and ground anchors can secure the pipeline against lateral movement when located by piles or grouted to the substrate. Deploying these items usually requires diver input for controlling the placement, and may also require the diver to physically move components like sandbags.

==== Trenching barges ====
Simplified drawing showing a typical jetting system for trenching below a submarine pipeline that is lying on the seafloor.

Trenching barges are used to excavate a trench on the seabed for a pipeline or cable to protect and stabilise it. Infilling is usually left to the natural action of the water on the seabed. The actual excavation is done by a sled which may use water jets, airlifts or mechanical plough systems to remove material and form the trench. This is generally done by towing the sled along using the pipeline to guide it after the pipeline is in position. The trench is progressively excavated under the pipeline, which sags into it as it is formed. Motion of the trenching barge is generally controlled by heaving in on the forward anchors and slacking away the stern anchors, which will periodically be moved by a service vessel. Diving tasks may include inspection of the pipeline and trench, including measurements where applicable, setting the sled and dealing with problems which may arise during the trenching operation.

==== Connections ====
Connections may include tie-in of a pipeline to a platform riser, wellhead, manifold, or another pipeline by end or tee connection, insertion of valves, and connection to flexible hoses at single point moorings. The work may include measurement and survey of the components to be connected, welded and flanged connections, including inspection, alignment, surface preparation, fitting of gaskets and bolts, tensioning of bolts and testing. Disconnecting may also be necessary, which may involve splitting, cutting and burning work. When welding is necessary a hyperbaric welding chamber may be fitted around the pipeline so that welding can be done in an inert gaseous environment rather than wet, as this improves the weld quality. Depending on circumstances, the chamber may be large enough for the welder to work inside, but as the chamber must be accessed at depth and is under ambient pressure, the work must be done by a diver.

==== Pipeline inspection ====
Pipeline inspection is done by divers or remotely operated vehicles (ROVs). Inspection requirements may be set by owners, certifying authorities, insurance companies and government departments, and there are a number of tasks which may be specified. These generally include inspection for pipeline stability, damage and fouling, and the inspection is usually recorded on video with a running commentary, and by still photography for details. Damage will be measured and the position and extent recorded. Repairs will also usually be done by divers.

==== Pigging ====
A pig is a tool that fits closely into the bore of a pipe and is driven along the inside of a pipeline by a pressure differential and used to perform a specific task for which it is specially designed. Pigging is done to inspect the bore, scrape off deposits, sediment or corrosion products, or separate two different product batches. Access to the pipeline for inserting or removing pigs must be done by divers when the access point is underwater. The diver may also connect pressure hoses, open and close valves, and monitor progress of the pig past indicator stations. Pigs are designed to pass through fully opened gate and ball valves, and round bends, but the negotiable bend radius depends on the pig design.

=== Single point mooring systems ===
A single point or single buoy mooring system is a facility for loading and unloading petroleum products to tankers, which moor to them only by the bow. One or two flexible hoses are used to transfer the products between the pipeline and tanker. A SPM may be used in deep water to take oil from the oilfield via a production platform, and in shallow water to export or import crude oil or oil products from an oilfield or refinery, usually by way of a storage facility. A range of single point mooring configurations are in use, and installation, maintenance and inspection work on all types is commonly done by divers. The work may include placing the pipeline end manifold (PLEM) and connecting it to the submarine pipelines, installing anchor chains and checking and adjusting chain angles, installing the submarine hoses between the PLEM and the buoy, installing a ships mooring system and operating subsea valves. The work is likely to involve the use of winches and cranes, rigging, including use of tirfors, chain hoists, strops and spreaders, flanging, using wrenches, hammers and gaskets, oxy-arc burning and welding.

== Diving equipment ==
The diving equipment used for offshore work is chosen to facilitate the work to be done while exposing the personnel involved to an acceptably low level of risk. When reasonably practicable, use of remotely operated underwater vehicles is preferred, as this avoids exposing the diver to underwater hazards.

There is still a large amount of underwater work for which diver intervention is the only available alternative.

=== Surface oriented diving ===
Most of the shallower offshore diving is done by divers who do the dive on air and then exit the water, doing any required decompression in the water or as surface decompression in a chamber. This diving is done either on surface-supplied diving equipment using a low-pressure compressor to supply the breathing air, or on Scuba replacement, a more mobile form of surface supplied diving where the breathing air is supplied from high pressure storage cylinders on the dive boat. Scuba may be used by some operators for some work, but it is not considered suitable for offshore work by IMCA.

=== Saturation diving ===
Saturation diving is one way to reduce the overall risk to the diver while improving productivity. It is a very expensive, fairly hazardous and high-tech way of controlling risk economically. This apparent contradiction can be explained by the amount of time the diver can spend working productively for the time spent decompressing.

The time required for decompression depends on the exposure pressure and duration, but it reaches a maximum for a given depth when the diver is saturated with inert gas at that depth.

During decompression there is a risk of decompression sickness, which is, as a general rule, reduced by decompressing more slowly. In-water decompression can only be tolerated for relatively short periods, as it exposes the diver to other hazards, some of them proportional to the duration, so decompression in a dry chamber is preferred. Preferably the chamber can be removed from the water during decompression, for further reduction of exposure to hazards, so the chamber must be pressurised. This chamber should be reasonably small to keep down the cost of deployment, so it is an advantage to transfer the divers into a more spacious and comfortable chamber on the surface platform, which also allows the bell to be used for the next shift while the first divers are decompressing.

The procedure described so far is known as bell bounce diving, or transfer under pressure (TUP) diving, and it is used for work where the amount of time spent at depth is relatively short. When the time spent decompressing would exceed the time between shifts, the diver would be more profitably employed underwater, and the time in the chamber would be less risky if the diver was not being decompressed, so a larger set of chambers can be used, in which the divers spend off-shift time under the same pressure they will experience at the underwater worksite. At the end of the job they are all decompressed together slowly, but the total time in decompression is reduced. This is cost-effective and puts the divers at less risk of decompression sickness than bounce diving for the same amount of time at the worksite.

The personal diving equipment used by saturation divers is similar to that used by surface supplied divers, with the addition of the closed bell and saturation system. The longer deeper dives and helium based breathing gases expose the saturation diver to greater heat loss, so hot-water suits are more likely to be used, and the cost of the helium makes it more likely that breathing gas reclaim systems will be used. These are systems where the exhaled gas is piped back to the surface for recycling.

=== Diving support vessels ===
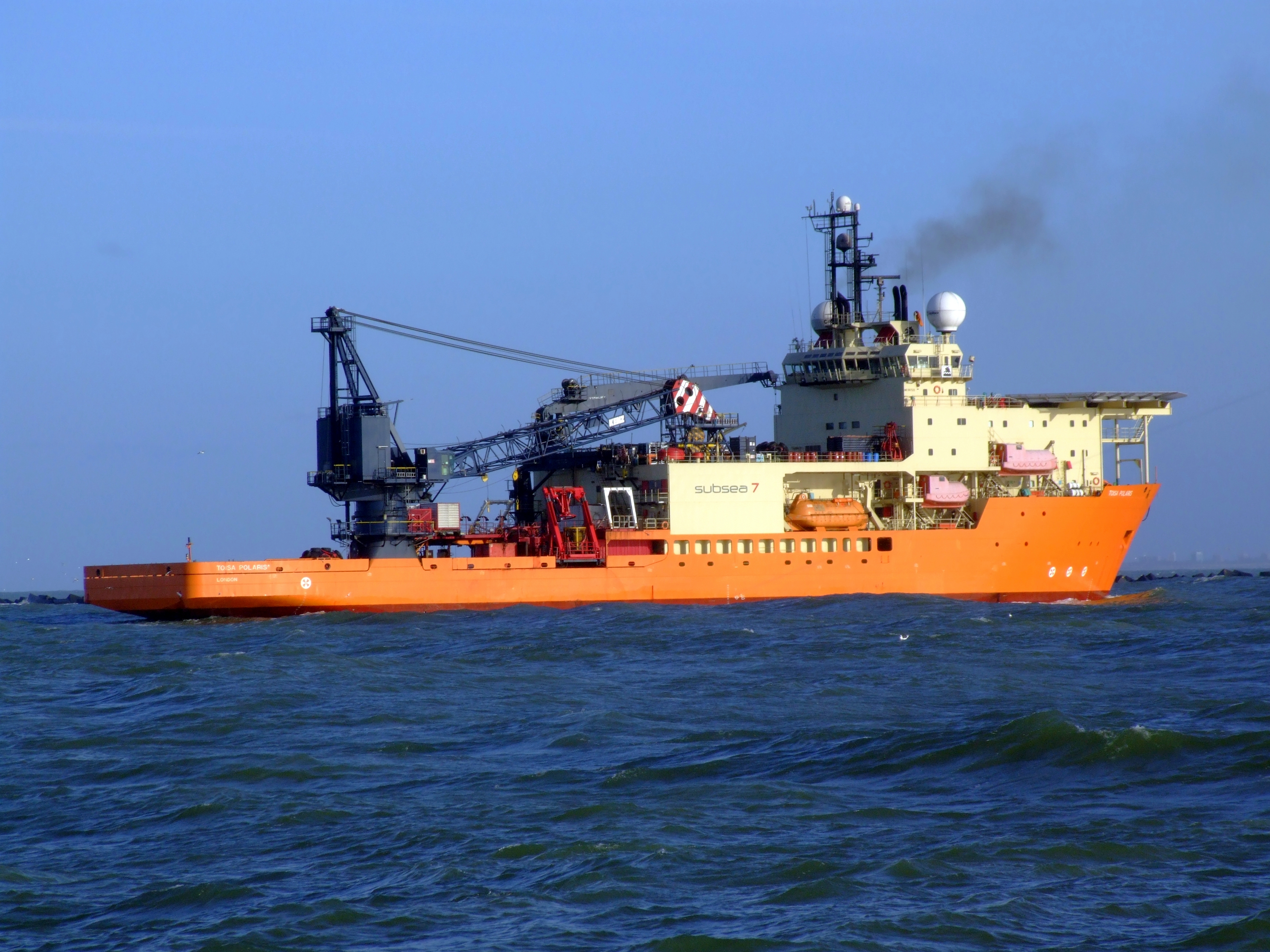
Diving support vessel Toisa Polaris

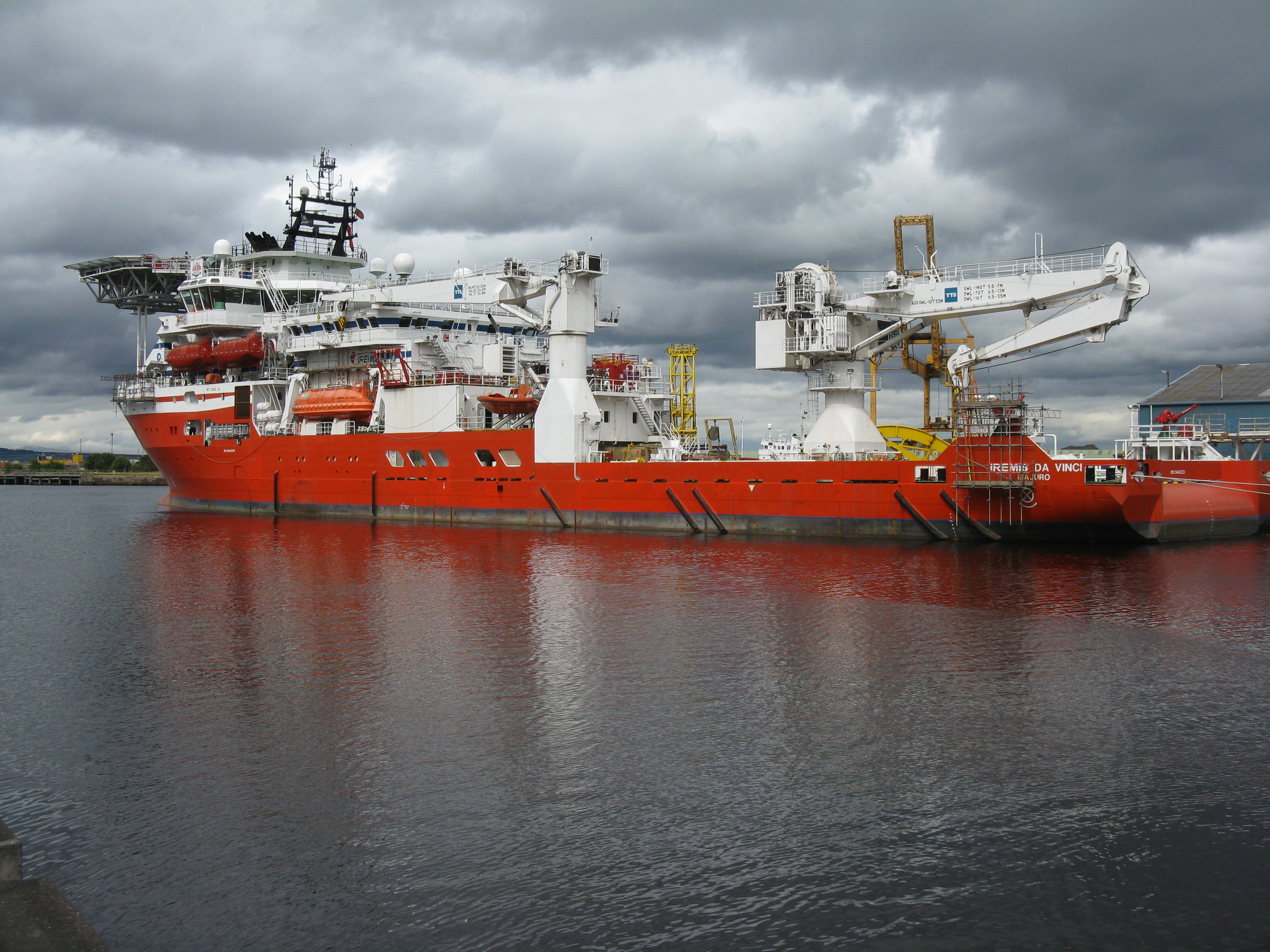
Iremis da Vinci at the Albert Dock Basin, Port of Leith. A multi-purpose diving support vessel, built in the Republic of Korea in 2011, and registered at Majuro, Marshall Islands, It is 115.4m long and has a gross tonnage of 8691t,

Offshore diving may be from a stationary platform or a diving support vessel. Most diving is from moored or anchored vessels as live-boat diving exposes the diver to additional hazards of thrusters and propellers. Special precautions are needed when diving from dynamically positioned vessels. The size of the vessel may range from small boats capable of supporting a dive team using scuba replacement to large support vessels with full saturation systems, bell launch and recovery systems, and heavy lifting gear.

==== Moonpools ====
Some diving support vessels have an opening through the bottom of the hull called a moonpool to facilitate diver deployment. This is usually the part of the vessel with the least vertical motion in a seaway, which makes launch and recovery of the bell or stage easier, safer and more comfortable for the divers.

==== Diving from dynamically positioned vessels ====
Dynamically positioned vessels (DPVs) are vessels which can hold a position and heading by computer-controlled operation of thrusters and propellers. In many cases this can be done sufficiently precisely to use as a platform for diving operations, but there are specific hazards associated with this mode of diving. The vessel control system monitors its position by reference systems which may include taut wire, radar surface stations (Artemis), Seabed acoustic transponders (Hydracoustic Position Reference) or Differential Global Positioning System, using satellites and a terrestrial base station. International Marine Contractors Association (IMCA) guidance requires at least three independent referencing systems of at least two different types for DPV diving operations, to minimise the risk of loss of position. The DP footprint is the scope of movement of the vessel, and it is limited for safety of the divers. Three alert levels are provided to the diving team to indicate the current capacity of the vessel to maintain position. Green indicates normal status, where diving work can be done, yellow indicates partly degraded status, where the divers would be recalled to the bell, and red indicates emergency status, where the dive would be aborted. The particular hazards of DPV diving include loss of position and thruster hazards. Special precautions are taken to prevent divers from getting into the danger zones of thrusters and propellers. These include limiting umbilical length, and other physical restraints.

== Management and control of diving operations ==
Offshore diving practices are basically similar in principle to inshore diving practices, but are extended to include practices specific to the equipment and environment.

=== Personnel ===
The usual commercial diving management system of having a diving supervisor of appropriate competence in direct and immediate control of a diving operation is also standard for offshore work. IMCA has a system for certification of offshore air and saturation diving supervisors, which is recognised and used by all signatory contractors. This system is fairly representative of most offshore diving operations, but details may differ.

A major diving project or offshore installation may also have a diving superintendent on staff. The diving superintendent is usually a senior diving supervisor appointed by the diving contractor and is responsible for the overall planning and conduct of diving work, and will be responsible for allocating a diving supervisor for each diving operation.

A saturation system will be managed by a Life Support Supervisor and operated by Life Support Technicians (LSTs), and there will usually be one or more Diving Medical Technicians (DMTs)on site, and an off-site standby contract with a suitably rated Diving Medical Practitioner, who is trained in diving medicine and able to advise on treatment under hyperbaric conditions.

=== Diving team ===
The diving team will include at least one working diver and at least one standby diver, a diving supervisor and a tender for each diver. Other personnel may be needed to operate special equipment like winches and a bell launch and recovery system, and to operate cranes and other equipment related to the work to be done. If the divers are deployed using a diving bell, the standby diver stays in the bell and is called the bellman. The bellman acts as tender for the working diver's umbilical, but must tend his own umbilical during a rescue. The working diver and bellman may swap functions during a shift to give the diver a break. A standard practice is for the standby diver's umbilical to be about 2m longer than the working diver's umbilical, to ensure that the standby diver can reach the diver in an emergency.

=== Saturation dives ===
Saturation divers will live under pressure in the saturation system between dives. They are pressurised at the beginning of a tour of duty and remain under storage pressure at as close as reasonably practicable to the working depth until they are decompressed at the end of the tour, which may take up to two weeks, depending on the storage pressure. Excursions to deeper and shallower working depths are carefully planned and controlled to minimise the risk of decompression sickness. Limited excursions may be possible without special decompression, but larger excursions may require part of the saturation system to be isolated for additional decompression, or if short, it can be done in the bell. The bell can be locked onto the saturation system, and the divers transfer from the saturation system living quarters to the bell under pressure. When the bell reaches working depth the bottom lock is opened and the divers get out and back in through it. Before surfacing the bell the lock is closed and sealed to maintain internal pressure, and the divers transfer back to the saturation system living quarters under pressure.

=== Bounce dives ===
Surface oriented dives are those in which the diver is not under saturation. These are also referred to as bounce dives, and the divers may be deployed using a diving stage, wet bell or closed bell, or for shallow dives directly from the vessel or platform, depending on what water access is available. Launch and recovery systems (LARS) are used to lower the stage or bell and to lift it out after the dive.

=== Risk management ===
Once risks have been identified and assessed, all techniques to manage the risk fall into one or more of these four major categories:

- Avoidance (eliminate, withdraw from or not become involved)
- Reduction (optimize – mitigate)
- Sharing (transfer – outsource or insure)
- Retention (accept and budget)

Ideal use of these strategies may not be possible. Some of them may involve trade-offs that are not acceptable to the organization or person making the risk management decisions.

== Health and safety ==
Offshore diving generally takes place at remote sites, and emergency medical facilities may be far away, so it is common to include relatively complex and expensive emergency facilities and personnel on site. The actual diving work is usually done by one or two divers, backed up by a team of support personnel, both to facilitate getting the work done, and to provide an acceptably low level of risk for the diver and other affected personnel. Offshore diving operations are expensive and inherently hazardous, so extensive planning and effective management are necessary to control risk and ensure that the necessary work is done effectively.

=== Legislation and codes of practice ===
==== National regulations ====
The Approved Code of Practice and guidance for Commercial diving projects offshore published by the HSE provides guidance on compliance with the UK Diving at Work Regulations 1997

==== IMCA guidance ====
IMCA members are obliged to comply with IMCA guidance in their diving operations. This is guidance is provided in a group of documents detailing industry recognised good practice for various aspects of offshore diving, including:

- IMCA D 006 Diving operations in the vicinity of pipelines
- IMCA D 010 Diving operations from vessels operating in dynamically positioned mode
- IMCA D 014 IMCA international code of practice for offshore diving
- IMCA D 018 Code of practice for the initial and periodic examination, testing and certification of diving plant and equipment
- IMCA D 019 Diving operations in support of intervention on wellheads and subsea facilities
- IMCA D 021 Diving in contaminated waters
- IMCA D 022 Guidance for diving supervisors
- IMCA D 025 Evacuation of divers from installations
- IMCA D 030 Surface supplied mixed gas diving operations
- IMCA D 034 Norway/UK Regulatory Guidance on Offshore Diving (NURGOD)
- IMCA D 042 Diver and ROV based concrete mattress handling, deployment, installation, repositioning and decommissioning
- IMCA D 052 Guidance on hyperbaric evacuation systems
- IMCA D 054 Remotely operated vehicle intervention during diving operations

=== Hazards ===
A hazard is any agent or situation that poses a level of threat to life, health, property, or environment. Most hazards remain dormant or potential, with only a theoretical risk of harm, and when a hazard becomes active, and produces undesirable consequences, it is called an incident and may culminate in an emergency or accident.

Divers face specific physical and health risks when they go underwater or use high pressure breathing gas. When a diver enters the water there is inherently a risk of drowning, and breathing while exposed to pressure imposes a risk of barotrauma and decompression sickness.

There are some hazards which are more common in the offshore environment and in offshore diving operations. There is more diving at extreme depths than in other applications, and the solutions to this bring their own hazards. In order to reduce the risks of compression arthralgia and decompression sickness, saturation divers decompress only once at the end of a tour of duty, but this introduces hazards associated with living under pressure and requiring a long decompression schedule. Helium gas is used in breathing mixtures to reduce work of breathing and nitrogen narcosis, which would make deep diving work difficult or impossible, but the consequences include accelerated heat loss and higher risk of hypothermia, so hot-water suits are used for active warming, but they introduce a risk of heat injuries if something goes wrong with the temperature control system.

Work on oilfields may result in exposure to crude oil and natural gas components, some of which (such as hydrogen sulphide) can be highly toxic.

Much of the diving work involves moving and handling large and heavy objects, and inherently hazardous tools and equipment. These hazards are usually aggravated by the underwater environment.

The inherent problems with offshore evacuation in emergencies like fire or sinking, which are problematic for ordinary crew, are much more difficult to deal with for divers in saturation. The methods of controlling the risks due to these hazards are usually engineering solutions, and are expensive, and often introduce secondary hazards which must also be managed.

=== Risk ===
Hazard and vulnerability interact with likelihood of occurrence to create risk, which can be the probability of a specific undesirable consequence of a specific hazard, or the combined probability of undesirable consequences of all the hazards of a specific activity.

The presence of a combination of several hazards simultaneously is common in diving, and the effect is generally increased risk to the diver, particularly where the occurrence of an incident due to one hazard triggers other hazards with a resulting cascade of incidents. Many diving fatalities are the result of a cascade of incidents overwhelming the diver, who should be able to manage any single reasonably foreseeable incident.

The assessed risk of a dive would generally be considered unacceptable if the diver is not expected to cope with any single reasonably foreseeable incident with a significant probability of occurrence during that dive. Precisely where the line is drawn depends on circumstances. Commercial diving operations are constrained by occupational health and safety legislation, but also by the physical realities of the operating environment, and expensive engineering solutions are often necessary to control risk.

==== Assessed risk ====
Risk assessment is the determination of an estimate of risk related to a well-defined situation and a recognized set of hazards. Quantitative risk assessment requires calculations of two components of risk : the magnitude of the potential loss, and the probability that the loss will occur. An acceptable risk is a risk that is understood and tolerated, usually because the cost or difficulty of implementing an effective countermeasure for the associated vulnerability exceeds the expectation of loss.

A formal hazard identification and risk assessment is a standard and required part of the planning for a commercial diving operation, and this is also the case for offshore diving operations. The occupation is inherently hazardous, and great effort and expense are routinely incurred to keep the risk within an acceptable range. The standard methods of reducing risk are followed where possible.

==== Statistical risk ====
Statistics on injuries related to commercial diving are normally collected by national regulators. In the UK the Health and Safety Executive (HSE) is responsible for the overview of about 5,000 commercial divers, and in Norway the corresponding authority is the Petroleum Safety Authority Norway (PSA), which has maintained the DSYS database since 1985, gathering statistics on over 50,000 diver-hours of commercial activity per year.

In 2013 the UK HSE reported a fatal accident rate for commercial offshore and inland/inshore diving of typically 20–40 per 100,000 workers per year. That is much more than the rate found in construction or agricultural activities and results in diving being classified as "high hazard" by the HSE.

According to a 2011 report to PSA, the last recorded saturation diving fatality in Norway occurred in 1987, and few serious incidents happened over the preceding 25 years. In 2010 there were two reported incidents leading to injuries.

== Training and qualification ==
The qualifications required for offshore diving work are to a large extent outside the normal jurisdiction of national governments due to the geographical situation of the work-sites, but the contractors and client organisations are bound by national and international legislation, and the procedural guidelines of organisations of which they may be members or signatories. A large number of international marine contractors are members of the International Marine Contractors Association (IMCA), and much of international offshore diving follows IMCA procedures.

=== Diver training and certification ===
Offshore divers are trained in the use of surface supplied diving equipment, which is standard for most offshore diving work. As much offshore diving contracts are carried out by members of IMCA, a large majority of the divers are registered with certification recognised by IMCA and the International Diving Regulators Forum (IDRF).

Recognised qualifications listed by the International Diving Schools Association include:

IDSA Level 3: Surface Supplied Offshore Air Diver equivalence:

- Australia: Part 3
- Canada: Unrestricted Surface Supplied Diver to 50m + Unrestricted SCUBA
- Denmark: Surface Supplied Diver to 50m
- France: Class 2 Mention A
- Morocco: Class 2 Mention A
- Netherlands: Certificate B
- New Zealand: Part 3
- Norway: Petroleum Safety Authority (PSA) Part 1 : Surface orientated Diver North Sea Offshore
- South Africa: Class 2
- Sweden: Diver Certificate C Wet Bell 60m
- UK: HSE Part 1, HSE SCUBA plus HSE Surface Supply plus Tools Training module plus Surface Supplied Top Up

IDSA Level 4: Closed Bell Mixed Gas Diver equivalence:

- Australia: Part 4 diver
- Canada: Bell diver
- France: Class 3 Mention A
- New Zealand: Part 3
- Norway: NPD Bell Diver
- South Africa: Class 1
- UK: HSE Part 2, HSE Closed Bell

=== Offshore diving supervisor registration ===
All offshore diving operations by IMCA registered contractors must be under the control of an IMCA supervisor. There are two levels:

- IMCA Air Diving Supervisor
- IMCA Bell Diving Supervisor

=== Work skills training and assessment ===
Some work skills are implied by IDSA equivalent certification, and are included in diver training for these certificates, but many of the more complex and technical skills must be learned elsewhere. There is no prescription for where these other skills are learned, and it is generally left to the employer to ensure that their employees are competent to do the job for which they are hired, and for the contractor to ensure that they deploy personnel who are competent to do the job for the client. IMCA provides guidance for assessment of several key offshore diving competences, which are transferable between IMCA member employers, but is not directly involved in the assessments. Some of these competences are renewable periodically, to ensure that the diver is currently competent. Portfolio of evidence based systems are used where the diver keeps a record of assessments, verification records and evidence in the form of competence appraisal forms, work records and testimonials by competent witnesses. Where competence is shown by records of formal education and training by a reputable organisation this may be recognised, but a significant part of training may be on the job.

== Historical issues ==
=== Timeline of offshore diving ===
The first commercial offshore saturation dive was performed by Westinghouse in the Gulf of Mexico following Hurricane Betsy in March 1966. Not long after, in 1970, saturation diving in the North Sea at Ekofisk commenced.

=== Accidents in the offshore diving industry ===
The offshore diving industry is hazardous, and has had a number of serious accidents over the years, and though working procedures and equipment have evolved in response to accident analysis, and the record has improved, offshore diving remains a relatively dangerous occupation. This section lists some of the more notable incidents.

- Byford Dolphin diving bell accident – Explosive decompression of an occupied saturation chamber (1983)
- Death of Bradley Westell – Fatal diving accident in the North Sea in 1995
- Drill Master accident – Fatal diving bell accident off Norway in 1974
- Star Canopus accident – Fatal offshore diving bell accident in 1978
- Venture One accident – Saturation diving fatality in the North Sea in 1977
- Waage Drill II accident – Fatal saturation diving accident in the North Sea in 1975
- Wildrake accident – Fatal offshore diving accident in Scotland, 1979

=== Litigation in Norway's sector ===
A 7 December 2013 Verdens Gang editorial said that "According to the divers' own numbers, 66 divers died while on duty during the pioneering age" in the North Sea with the first commercial diving casualty occurring as early as October 2, 1967. One notable accident in 1983 aboard the Byford Dolphin claimed the lives of five divers.

A 2013 European Court of Human Rights verdict said that the [pioneer] divers were "in a situation risking their lives and health when they took on the dangerous job. The government should have taken [occupational] safety measures. But on the contrary. The tables that showed how fast the divers were to [come to the] surface after a dive, were held secret by the companies. Faster surfacing resulted in a cheaper dive, but also increased the risk. The government's control and follow-up was too poor." (In Norway's sector of the North Sea, 17 divers died during a 20 year-period from 1967 — 11 individuals were British. In 2013 Aftenposten said that "During the pioneering period, most of the [oil] companies used (forholdt seg til) dive tables based on research by U.S. Navy. The dive tables were supposed to ensure that the divers avoided so called bends. The problem was that the U.S tables were formulated for divers during a transportation phase in a crisis situation. Not for shift work over several hours. The tables were also created for survival possibilities during an acute (akutt) evacuation—not necessarily concerning oneself with issues of long-term health. Authors Kristin Øye Gjerde and Helge Ryggvik indicate that several international companies often competed in pressing (å presse) the tables further. Status was acquired by beating the records. Effectivity (effektivitet) put [more] money in the till.")

Aftenposten also claimed that "The first trade union came in 1977"; Teknisk Ukeblad says that divers first joined the trade union in 1978.

On 1 July 1978 a set of "temporary rules" [for diving] were instituted—12 years after diving had started and 11 years after the first serious accident.

Furthermore, "According to the Lossius Commission (a commission of inquiry ordered by the Cabinet in 2000) around 3 of 4 divers had accidents or diving related illnesses. Over half had bends, and 83% encountered life-endangering situations while diving."

Norway's government has claimed responsibility for pioneering divers on a moral and political foundation, without taking a judicial responsibility for medical injuries.

80 applicants, out of 340, have been denied governmental compensation for pioneering divers. In 2013 in the European Court of Human Rights three commercial divers won their case against Norway. (In 2012 European Court of Human Rights stated it will try the case of three commercial divers that lost their case in Norway's supreme court in 2010. The court had not concluded in the case, as of August 2013.)

== Sources ==
- Bevan, John (2005). The Professional Divers's Handbook (second ed.). Alverstoke / Gosport, Hampshire: Submex Ltd. ISBN 978-0950824260.
- Limbrick, Jim (2001). North Sea Divers – a Requiem. Hertford: Authors OnLine. ISBN 0-7552-0036-5.
- Smart, Michael (2011). Into the Lion's Mouth: The Story of the Wildrake Diving Accident. Medford, Oregon: Lion's Mouth Publishing. ISBN 978-0-615-52838-0. LCCN 2011915008.
