= Westell (surname) =

Westell is a surname. Notable people with the name include:

- Bradley Westell (1965/6–1995), British commercial diver who died in the North Sea
- Ian Westell (fl. 1940s/1950s), Australian rules footballer for Sandy Bay Football Club in Tasmania
- John Westell (1921–1989), English sailboat designer
- William Percival Westell (1874–1943), English naturalist and writer

== See also ==
- Westell, an American telecommunications equipment company
- Westall (disambiguation)
