= Westall =

Westall or Westell may refer to:

== People ==
- John Westall (1901–1986), New Zealand Royal Marines officer
- Michael Westall (born 1939), bishop of South-West Tanganyika 2001–2006
- Richard Westall (1765–1836), English painter
- Robert Westall (1929–1993), English writer
- Walter W. Westall (1880–1968), New York politician
- Wilfrid Westall (1900–1982), English bishop
- William Westall (1781–1850), English landscape artist
- William Bury Westall (1834–1903), English novelist
- Cecily Westall Rymill (1939–1991), first wife of Australian business executive John Spalvins
- Richard Westall Rogers Jr. (born 1950), American serial killer

== Places ==
- Westall, Clayton South, Victoria, Australia
- Westall railway station, Melbourne, Australia
- Westall Road, Australian road
- Mount Westall (Queensland), Australian mountain

== Other ==
- Westall UFO, Australian UFO sighting

== See also ==
- Westell, an American telecommunications equipment company
- Westell (surname)
