= Westoll =

Westoll is a surname. Notable people include:

- Andrew Westoll, Canadian writer
- Thomas Stanley Westoll (1912–1995), British geologist
- Tim Westoll (1918–1999), English barrister, country landowner, and politician

== See also ==
- Westall (disambiguation)
