= Limeburner Point =

Point near Albany Western Australia

- Point
- Coordinates: 35°5′S 117°54′E
- Limeburner Point

Limeburner Point is a point on the south coast of Shoal Bay, Princess Royal Harbour, on the south coast of Western Australia near Albany. It is located just west of the more prominent Limekilns Point.

It was in the vicinity of Limeburner Point that the first known specimens of Cephalotus follicularis (Western Australian Pitcher Plant) were collected by Ferdinand Bauer and William Westall in January 1802.
