= Star Canopus diving accident =

Fatal offshore diving bell accident in 1978

- Date: 26 November 1978
- Location: Beside Beryl Alpha platform, Beryl oil field, East Shetland Basin, North Sea, Scotland; 59°33′N 1°32′E
- Cause: Diving bell lift wire and umbilical severed
- Participants: Ed Hammond, Robert Kelly, Lothar Michael Ward, Gerard Anthony "Tony" Prangley
- Outcome: Deaths of Ward and Prangley

The Star Canopus diving accident was an incident in Scotland in November 1978 that killed two British commercial divers. During a routine dive beside the Beryl Alpha platform in the North Sea, the diving bell of the diving support vessel MS Star Canopus was lost when its main lift wire, life support umbilical, and guide wires were severed by an anchor chain of the semi-submersible Haakon Magnus. The bell dropped to the seabed at a depth of over 100 metres (330 ft). Its two occupants, 25-year-old Lothar Michael Ward and 28-year-old Gerard Anthony "Tony" Prangley, were unable to release the bell's drop weight in order to return to the surface because it was secured to the bell frame with secondary locking pins. Since there was not a bell stage to keep the bottom door of the bell off the seabed, the divers could not exit the bell to release the pins. Despite the efforts of three rescue vessels – Intersub 4, Tender Carrier, and Uncle John – the bell was not recovered for over thirteen hours, by which time Ward and Prangley had died of hypothermia and drowning.

== Background ==
On 26 November 1978 the Diving Support Vessel Star Canopus was dynamically positioned on the northeast side of the Beryl Alpha platform conducting diving operations. 334 feet (102 m) below, Michael Ward was working for Northern Divers about 60 feet (18 m) off the seabed trying to connect a 6-inch (150 mm) flow line to a riser flange protruding from the side of the concrete platform.

Oil production had declined that year, and with winter conditions upon them, subsea work had fallen behind schedule. There was "a lot of catching up to do", Martin Dane, the Contracts Manager for Northern Divers would say later, and Mobil Oil, like many operators, decided to allow the diving program to continue through the winter months to take advantage of available weather windows.

Earlier that evening, London Weather Center had predicted 40-knot gusts between 18:00 and midnight. That forecast proved to be correct. At 2030, and again at 2245, squalls reaching those speeds moved in and blew the Canopus off location. Shortly thereafter, Captain Roy Forsyth terminated diving operations. But when the 12-hour shift change occurred at midnight, weather conditions had calmed. Coming on duty, Supervisor Robert Kelly was instructed by diving superintendent Ed Hammond to continue with the dive program due to improved conditions.

The weather forecast now predicted that there would be a change in wind direction from west to north, and that conditions "would worsen later in the day" with wind speeds gusting to 35 knots. The Canopus's dynamic positioning system could not support more than 18–20 knots with the wind hitting her broadside.

== Accident and recovery ==
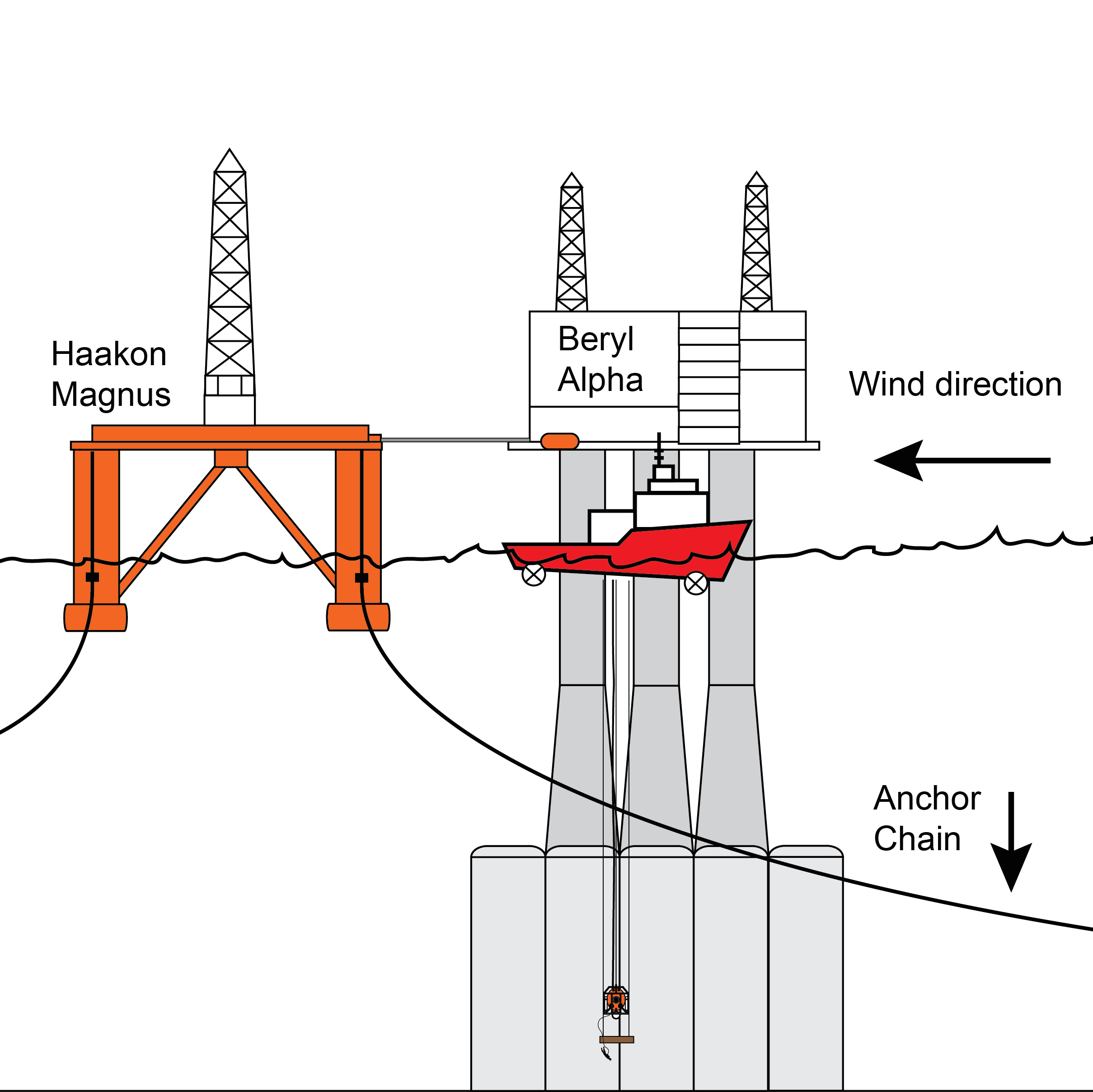
Position of the Canopus prior to the accident, with Ward locked out of the bell

Prior to the accident, the wind-speed indicator was fluctuating between 15 and 20 knots (28 and 37 km/h). Standing alongside the Beryl platform, near where the Canopus would be commencing work, was the Haakon Magnus, a Norwegian semi-submersible platform, with her massive anchor chains extended. Kelly determined the weather was suitable for diving and, at 0240, he launched the bell with Tony Prangley and Michael Ward inside.

At 0312, Ward locked out and found the pipe flange protruding from the wall of the platform base. Eight minutes later, Captain Forsyth called Kelly on the ship's intercom to alert him that a squall was approaching on the ship's radar. Kelly ordered Ward back to the bell where he sat for the next 40 minutes. At 0400 Ward was back on the job. Then, at 0545, the wind suddenly shifted directions and began blowing from the north at a speed of 40 knots, hitting the Canopus on her beam, and overpowering her dynamic positioning (DP) system. It was a sustained blow, the Contracts Manager would later testify:

When this wind arrived, it arrived really without any warning and it was not like a sudden gust of wind or a passing squall which then died down; it started blowing suddenly at 40 knots and remained at that level for a considerable period of time thereafter. It was a very strange occurrence, to say the least.

In dive control, Supervisor Kelly was at the control panel when an amber warning light and the 'Dive Alert' alarm were activated. Captain Forsyth's ordered the divers to return to the bell. Kelly relayed the message to Ward who stopped what he was doing and swam back to the bell. In the trunking he took off his helmet as Prangley stacked his umbilical.

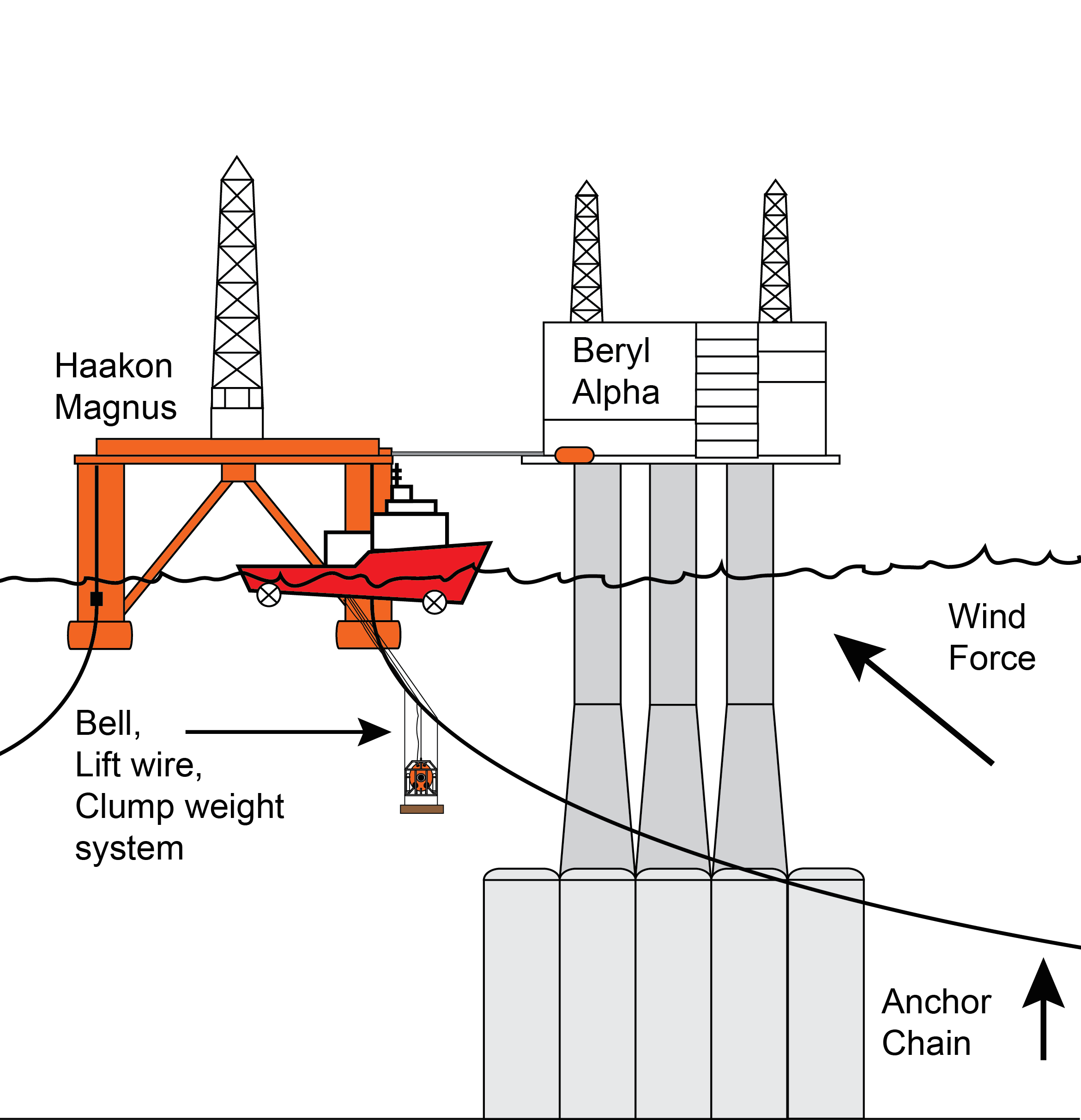
The Canopus being blown into the path of the Haakon Magnus anchor chain

On the surface, the force of the wind had blown the Canopus sideways against the platform overhang, snapping off the ship's mast which came crashing down onto the deck. At the same time, the wind was driving the ship backwards towards the Haakon Magnus. Captain Forsyth quickly took the ship off DP and tried to swing the bow outboard to keep the vessel from grounding on the submerged pontoons of the Magnus. Then he pressed the 'Dive Abort' alarm and called dive control.

In dive control, Kelly was waiting for Prangley and Ward to seal the bell when the red 'Dive Abort' indicator suddenly lit up. Captain Forsyth again contacted Kelly at the control panel, restating the need for the divers to return to the bell. But when Kelly called down to the bell, he discovered that Prangley was having difficulty pulling in Ward's umbilical; it was snagged on something outside the bell. He did not know on what, but now there was no way to shut the inside hatch until the umbilical was cleared. Ward wanted to lock out to fix the problem, but Kelly forbade him from doing so. Instead, he told Ward to throw the dive hat out of the bell, then pull in the umbilical. But when this was tried, the umbilical remained snagged.

Meanwhile, Kelly received another urgent message from Captain Forsyth asking if he had started recovering the bell yet. Kelly explained the delay and said he would notify the bridge when he started the recovery. He told the divers to stop what they were doing, and to cut the hose, and be quick about it. Several minutes later, as the bell smashed against the base of the platform, Prangley and Ward got a seal and notified topside.

In dive control, Kelly was watching his two divers on the video monitor while the bell was being raised. Prangley was calling out the depth every 10 metres (33 ft). When the bell was 30 metres (98 ft) from the surface, Prangley suddenly stood up, waved his fist shoulder high, and shouted, "All stop." On the monitor, he appeared to be listening to something.

Supervisor Kelly did as he was told, and from dive control, he had a clear view of the moonpool and could see that something was wrong. The bell umbilical and clump weight guide wires were not hanging straight down through the moonpool; they were leaning towards the bow of the ship. Furthermore, the trolley that the wires were hanging from was violently shaking and vibrating. Kelly then lost video feed of the divers. The Star Canopus had been blown across the path of a Haakon Magnus anchor chain, completely severing all connections to the bell, including the life-support umbilical, the main lift wire, and the clump weight/guide wire recovery system. In that instant, the bell, with Prangley and Ward inside, began plummeting to the seabed below.

Both divers survived the 294-foot (90 m) fall. With their hot-water supply disconnected, the bell's internal temperature began to drop rapidly. If rescuers did not arrive soon, the divers' only recourse would be to release the drop weight to surface the bell. However, Prangley and Ward could not release the weight because it was externally secured to the bell frame with a set of "secondary locking pins". Because the bell was not equipped with a stage to keep the bottom hatch out of the mud, Prangley and Ward had no way to get out to release them. The bell was also not equipped with a strobe flasher to help rescue divers find it in the dark. In addition, the crew of the Canopus had removed the bell transponder some time before the dive.

=== Recovery ===
With a storm occurring on the surface, it took rescuers more than thirteen hours to recover the stricken bell to the deck of the Canopus. By that time, Ward had died of hypothermia and Prangley had drowned. (Note: Although Prangley was also suffering from hypothermia, his death was ruled as a drowning. When the bell was initially raised off the seabed, he fell out of the trunking and floated to the surface. Source: Prangley/Ward FAI Transcript p. 152.)

== See also ==
- Wildrake diving accident – similar fatal accident in 1979
- Stena Seaspread diving accident – similar nonfatal accident in 1981
