= William Percival Westell =

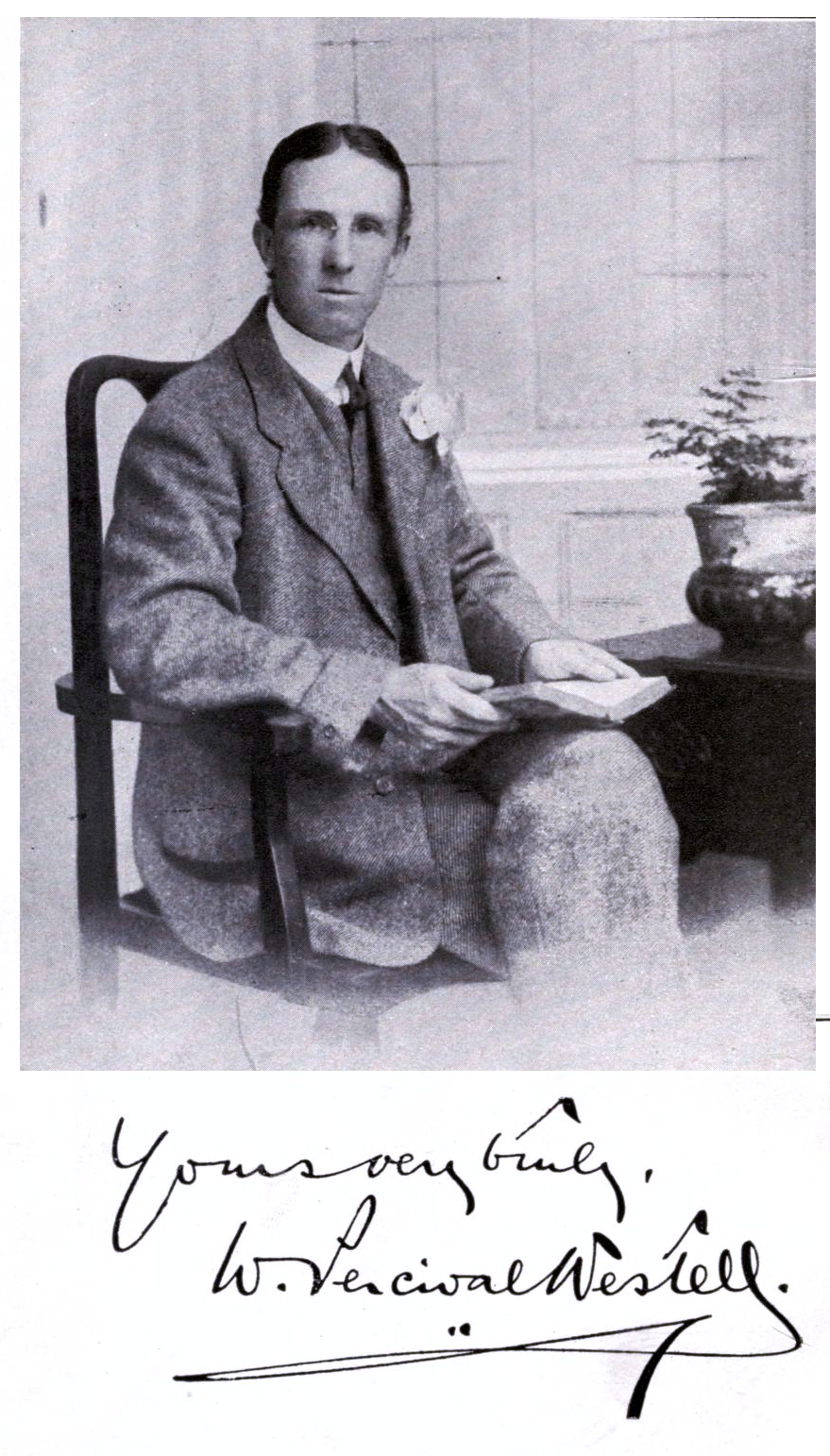

William Percival Westell (12 December 1874 – 1 November 1943) was a British naturalist and natural history study popularizer. He published a range of books and founded the South Midlands Federation of Museums, and the Young Naturalists' League. He served as curator of the Letchworth Museum from 1914 until his death.

== Life and work ==
Westell was born in St Albans, Hertfordshire. His grandfather had an interest in nature and poetry while a great uncle Richard (1765–1836) was an artist who taught Queen Victoria. Another great uncle was the landscape artist William Westall (1781 – 1850) who was a friend of Wordsworth. Educated at St. Albans Grammar School he became a clerk in a solicitor's office in the city of London at the age of fourteen. He married in 1896 and became an office manager. In 1908 he resigned, having published several books and finding ways to earn as a freelance lecturer. In 1907 he was elected Fellow of the Linnean Society. He was also a member of the British Ornithologists' Union, a fellow of the Royal Horticultural Society and other groups. By 1917 he had published 50 books on natural history and had appeared on BBC broadcasts on natural history. He taught natural history with a He also went to teach in schools, giving lantern lectures and in 1909 he founded the Young Naturalists' League. The motto was “One touch of nature makes the whole world kin” and by 1918 he had ten thousand boys and girls as members. Several of his books were published through the Religious Tract Society and the Society for the Promotion of Christian Knowledge.

Westell became the first curator of the Letchworth Museum in 1914, a post that was honorary and salaried only from 1928. He held the position until his death.
