= Stena Seaspread diving accident =

Saturation diving bell incident with successful rescue in the North Sea in 1981

- Date: 21 January 1981
- Location: Thistle oil field, East Shetland Basin, North Sea, Scotland; 61°21′47″N 1°34′47″E
- Cause: bell umbilical fouled on SALM
- Participants: Phil Robinson, Jim Tucker
- Outcome: successful through-water transfer to rescue bell

The Stena Seaspread diving accident occurred on 21 January 1981, when a diving bell containing two divers had its umbilical cord severed. Both divers were rescued.

Stena Seaspread in the Thistle Field, circa 1980. Photo by Mike Allen.

== Background ==
On 21 January 1981, Mike Allen was supervising bell dive No. 342 on board the Stena Seaspread, adjacent to the Thistle SALM. Allen had also been the rescue supervisor during the Wildrake diving accident in August 1979. Just after 10 o’clock that morning, Allen's boss, dive superintendent Mike O'Meara, stepped into the control van to ask how things were going. Five hundred feet below, diver Phil Robinson had just returned to the diving bell to join his partner, Jim Tucker. Robinson had been conducting a magnetic particle inspection on the SALM base when he ran out of ink. While his equipment was recharging, he took a short break.

== Accident ==
The Stena Seaspread was a new vessel and its powerful dynamic positioning system easily counteracted the strong tidal currents running that day. But unbeknownst to Allen, the tide had drawn an excessive amount of umbilical off the umbilical winch, allowing the lifeline to foul on the SALM. With constant movement from the ship, at 1015 a projection on the massive loading buoy cut a hole in the umbilical, piercing the main gas supply to the divers. Allen heard gas flowing through his panel, and at the same time, the divers in the bell reported a drop in gas pressure. After confirming that there was indeed a leak in the umbilical, O’Meara asked Robinson to lock out again (using on-board bell gas) to disconnect the swim line (a rope from the bell to the job site) and stow the inspection gear in the workbasket for recovery to the surface with the ship's crane.

At 1041, during the recovery, Allen lost all communications, video, and hot water to the bell. The main umbilical had been torn completely in half. It is thought that the workbasket had passed through a loop of the snagged umbilical. When the basket was pulled from the sea it had fibers from the umbilical outer covering attached. Allen established wireless through-water communications with his divers and determined that they were unharmed. Then he conducted bell checks with the divers to ensure that specific internal valves were closed.

Unlike the Wildrake bell, which was lost in the dark on the seabed, the Seaspread bell was still suspended by its lift wire. The main winch was functioning, so at 1122, Allen and O’Meara began hoisting the bell slowly to the surface. At 134 feet from the surface, Robinson and Tucker ordered Allen to stop the lift as the bell was losing pressure. The source of the leak could not be established, and Allen was forced to return the bell to its working depth. At 1147, O’Meara declared an emergency and began notifying nearby diving support vessels to come to his aid. It was later established that the divers had neglected to close the bell internal pneumofathometer valve behind one of the diver's tethers.

== Rescue ==
20 miles (32 kilometres) to the south, the semi-submersible Uncle John was stationed beside the Brent Bravo platform just as it had been during the Wildrake accident. When the emergency call came in at 1158, Comex Diving was monitoring a subsea pumping operation with an ROV (Remotely Operated Vehicle). The crew immediately recovered the ROV while the captain of the Uncle John began the process of dewatering the massive legs of the vessel. Normally it would have taken three to four hours to deballast the semi-submersible to raise it to transit depth, but the captain accelerated the process by executing an emergency deballast, pumping water from the legs through huge fire cannons mounted on the aft end. As the Uncle John headed north on its rescue mission, huge rooster tails of cascading seawater trailed behind.

Three hours later the Uncle John arrived alongside the Seaspread to begin the rescue. 400 feet (120 m) below the surface, Robinson and Tucker were keeping warm in thick mummy bags and using breathing masks which removed carbon dioxide from their respirations, and recycled their expired body heat. After the Wildrake accident, the diving industry recognized the futility of using space blankets as protection against hypothermia. Norway's Underwater Institute conducted thermal studies to test survival systems for stranded divers, and Wharton & Williams Taylor Diving, in conjunction with a local technology institute, developed a new survival suit with high heat-retention properties. Robinson and Tucker were using those suits.

In the Seaspread bell van, Allen and O'Meara discussed their options for rescue. They knew where Robinson and Tucker were, but they could not raise them to the surface. They decided to transfer the divers to a second rescue bell. This rescue option had also been considered during the Wildrake diving accident but had been rejected.

On board the Uncle John, Comex diving superintendent George Head lowered the rescue bell with divers Joe Puttnam, Richard Taylor, and Ken Iversen inside. At 400 feet (120 m) below sea level, they established a swim line between the two bells, took a hot-water hose to the stranded divers, warmed them up, then made the transfer by leading Robinson over first, then Tucker. For their part in the rescue operation, Puttnam and Taylor received the Queen's Commendation for Brave Conduct.
