= Westell =

Modem and Electronics Manufacturer

Westell Technologies, Inc.
- Company type: Public
- Traded as: OTC Pink: WSTL
- Industry: Communication Equipment
- Founded: October 1980
- Headquarters: Aurora, Illinois, United States
- Key people: Timothy Duitsman, President and CEO
- Products: In-building wireless, intelligent site management, Communication Network Solutions
- Revenue: US$29.96 million (2020)

Westell Technologies, Inc. is an Aurora, Illinois company that provides telecommunications equipment for in-building wireless, intelligent site management, cell site optimization, and outside plant solutions. Westell was the last company to manufacture DSL modems in the United States; however, on May 21, 2007, Westell announced plans to outsource manufacturing.

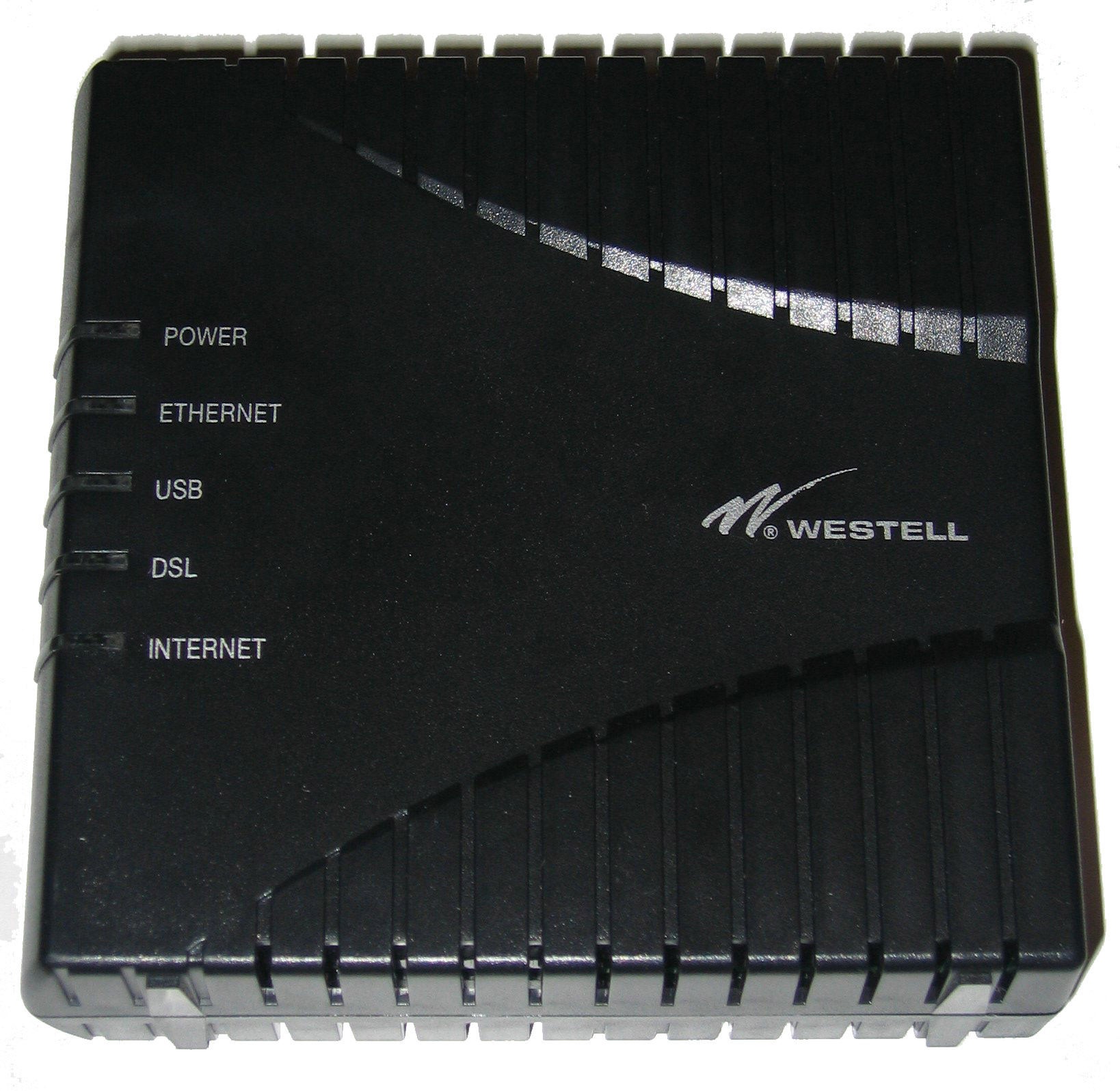
A Westell 6100 DSL modem

== History ==
Westell was founded in October 1980 in Willowbrook, Illinois, and initially produced electronic equipment used for signaling and transmission on telephone lines leased to private customers. Clinton Penny, who had previously founded Wescom Switching, founded Westell. Beginning in 1992, Westell began developing ADSL products. By the time of its initial public offering (IPO) in 1995, Westell was a prominent DSLAM manufacturer. The company moved out of this business in the wake of the stock market downturn of 2002, and then focused primarily on manufacturing cell site optimization equipment, Ethernet connectivity products, intelligent site management and a series of outdoor enclosure and cabinets.

In 2013, Westell acquired Kentrox Inc., a Dublin-based site management services company, for $30 million.
