= Mount Westall (Queensland) =

Mountain in Queensland, Australia

- Location within Queensland

Highest point
- Coordinates: 22°21′59″S 150°34′59″E

Geography
- Location: Queensland, Australia

Mount Westall is a mount in Queensland, Australia. It was named on 21 August 1802 by Matthew Flinders. Flinders, who was commander of HMS Investigator, anchored in Port Bowen that day, he went ashore to explore with his party of scientists. He offered to name the highest visible point in the vicinity after whoever reached the top first. The landscape artist William Westall won, hence the name.

== See also ==
- List of mountains in Australia
