= Wescom Switching Incorporated =

Designer and manufacturer of digital telecommunication products

Wescom Switching Incorporated was a designer and manufacturer of digital telecommunication products such as private branch exchanges (PBXs) from 1974 until its sale (along with Wescom Inc.) to Rockwell International in 1980. Rockwell continued the development and marketing of the 580 product line until the 580 technology was sold to Ditran in 1982.

== History ==
Clinton Penny (1917–1998) founded Wescom in 1965 and served as its president. It was headquartered in Downers Grove, Illinois.

Wescom had a major presence in the T1 transmission industry at the time, and also was marketing the 501 Analog PBX.

Sam Pitroda hired on at Wescom Inc around 1974, and developed some early digital switching technology. The '580" name represented the 5 functional areas or frames of the original "Large PBX (lpbx)" design. They were the Line, Trunk, Network, Service and Control frames. The "80" represented the 1980s decade which was quickly approaching while Wescom was developing its first commercial digital PBX during the 1975 to 1980 time period. The 580L PBX was the first of the 580 family of products from Wescom. In addition to an Intel 8080 CPU complex, the heart of the 580 was the digital network frame which implemented a 64 kb time-division multiplexing digital network as the basic switching fabric of the 580 DSS. The first product in the family was the 3072 timeslot 580L-PBX which had a set of six Intel 8080 microprocessor pairs, for handling individual tasks in its control complex (State, Database, Console, Register, Trunk and Line micro complexes(CPU, memory, IPBs). Each of these actually consisted of redundant processor cards, and each micro card had dual 8080 chips using hardware matching between two 8080 chips. Faults detected on any of the online micros would automatically switch to its standby copy. Intercommunication between the various micros was loaded into the appropriate software queues and sent via the hardware Interprocessor buffers (IPBs). The 580L, M and S systems also incorporated a standby Network block which could switch seamlessly into operation without dropping existing calls if a Network fault was detected. The network blocks used memory locations to contain voice data. In smaller sized systems the tasks were combined in fewer physical processors. This led to the term "monogeneric" software and hardware for the various sized systems.

In about 1978 the development of the automatic call distributors began, with the MACD (medium ACD) being released first at Frontier Airlines, followed by small and very small systems in short succession. By 1980, the 580 PBX and ACD development effort had effectively bankrupted Wescom with many vendors having placed the company on credit hold. Rockwell Intl purchased Wescom in 1980 solving Wescom's cash problems and embarking the company onto the common carrier market, creating the SCX product line. SCX provided the early backbone for the early MCI network after the break-up of AT&T. Rockwell already had a successful ACD business with the "Galaxy" system through their Collins Radio arm. Rockwell's interest in the 580 product line centered on its 100% non-blocking network frame that connected the voice paths within the system. The network frame actually had additional switching capability that would later be utilized to process digital connections.

The last of the 580 product line was probably sold in the early to mid 1990s by Ditran's successor Digital Transmission Inc. who developed additional hardware and software to utilize the ACD platform for public-safety answering points for enhanced 9-1-1 service.

Wescom Switching, Inc. had 16 patents issued which all related to the 580 product line. Some additional patents were issued after the sale to Rockwell as well.
