= Wildrake diving accident =

Fatal offshore diving accident in Scotland, 1979

- Date: 8 August 1979
- Location: Thistle oil field, East Shetland Basin, North Sea, Scotland; 61°21′47″N 1°34′47″E
- Cause: Lift wire separated from diving bell
- Participants: Richard Arthur Walker, Victor Francis "Skip" Guiel Jr.
- Outcome: Recovery of bodies of Walker and Guiel
- Inquiries: Fatal accident inquiry, 11-21 May 1981
- Trial: Crown v. Infabco Diving Services, Ltd.
- Litigation: Wrongful-death lawsuits, Scotland and United States

The Wildrake diving accident was an incident in Scotland in August 1979 that killed two American commercial divers. During a routine dive in the East Shetland Basin of the North Sea, the diving bell of the diving support vessel MS Wildrake became separated from its main lift wire at a depth of over 160 metres (520 ft). Although the bell was eventually recovered by Wildrake, its two occupants, 32-year-old Richard Arthur Walker and 28-year-old Victor Francis "Skip" Guiel Jr., died of hypothermia. The accident resulted in extensive subsequent litigation and led to important safety changes in the diving industry.

MS Wildrake in Bjørnafjorden, July 1979, shortly before the accident. The yellow-tipped SALM is moored to the side of the ship.

== Background ==
In March 1977, a Single Anchor Leg Mooring (SALM) system was installed in the Thistle oil field as a loading facility for oil tankers. It consisted of a buoy and riser connected to a gravity base on the seafloor. By January 1979, the buoy had become partially disconnected from the riser. British National Oil Corporation (BNOC) had the buoy blown free of the riser with explosives and taken to Amsterdam for repairs, but the explosive charges damaged the riser. In April 1979 the riser was removed from the base by divers and taken to Bergen, Norway to be repaired.

In early 1978, Brian Masterson, an English businessman and engineer, co-founded Infabco Diving Services Ltd., a commercial diving company. BNOC awarded Infabco a contract for diving services from the drill rig Gulnare alongside the Thistle Alpha platform. Investigative reporter Bryan Gould would later discover that BNOC's Offshore Construction Manager, Joe Singletary, facilitated Infabco's bid by allowing Masterson to examine his competitors' bids. After the Wildrake accident, BNOC's security division and Grampian Police investigated the possibility that Masterson had bribed BNOC officials for contracts. On 18 June 1979, BNOC contracted with Infabco to reinstall the SALM on its base in the Thistle field.

The MS Wildrake was a diving support vessel constructed for and owned by Anders Wilhelmsen AS, a Norwegian shipping company. It had a built-in saturation diving system designed and built by another Norwegian company, Møllerodden AS. In May 1979, Infabco began negotiations for exclusive rights to the Wildrake. In June and early July, with the Wildrake moored near Ulsteinvik, Infabco personnel prepared its diving system for use. The system was certified by Det Norske Veritas (DNV) on 3 July 1979. In mid-July, 17 bell runs were conducted from the Wildrake to prepare the SALM base for the reattachment.

Typical bell with stage and conventional clump weight system

During this period, several significant alterations were made to the diving system. The swivel connecting the lift wire to the bell was replaced with a pair of shackles. The clump weight below the bell, which served as a backup recovery system, was removed to enable the bell to be launched over the side of the Wildrake rather than through the ship's moon pool. The bell's drop weights, another secondary means of bell recovery, were lashed to the bell frame with nylon rope to prevent their accidental release. The accidental release of drop weights had caused fatal diving bell accidents in the North Sea in 1974 and 1976. The Wildrake bell also had no bell stage to keep the bottom hatch out of the mud if the bell became stranded on the sea bottom.

== Accident ==
In late July and early August 1979, Wildrake divers reattached the SALM buoy to the riser and prepared the SALM for transport from Bjørnafjorden to Thistle field. On the night of 7 August 1979, Richard Walker and Victor Guiel, who had been in saturation since 29 July, were lowered to a depth of 485 feet (148 m) in the Wildrake diving bell to work on the reattachment of the SALM to its base. This was Bell Dive No. 30 from the Wildrake. As the bell was lowered into the ocean, its transponder came loose, and the Wildrake deck foreman was ordered to cut it off.

Shortly after 02:20 on 8 August, Walker, who had been working outside the bell on the SALM base, saw that the bell had become separated from its lift wire and was hanging at an angle by its life support umbilical. He reported the emergency and rejoined Guiel in the bell, where the two divers closed and sealed the inside door. The bottom door, which opened outward, was left open and secured back to the bell frame.

Wildrake dive superintendent Peter Holmes and dive supervisor Brian Reid believed that the umbilical was the correct secondary means of bell recovery in the system Møllerodden AS had designed. Møllerodden later denied this, and DNV had not certified the umbilical winch for bell recovery. Reid attempted to raise the bell with the umbilical, which was already damaged. The umbilical wheel on the ship's davit consisted of a rubber tire between two circular metal plates. The umbilical became jammed between the tire and one of the side plates. A further attempt to raise the bell on the umbilical using the ship's crane damaged the umbilical even more severely, and power and hot water to the bell were cut off. In response to a faint radio transmission from Walker and Guiel, the Wildrake crew lowered the bell to the seabed at a depth of 522 feet (159 m).

== Rescue attempts ==
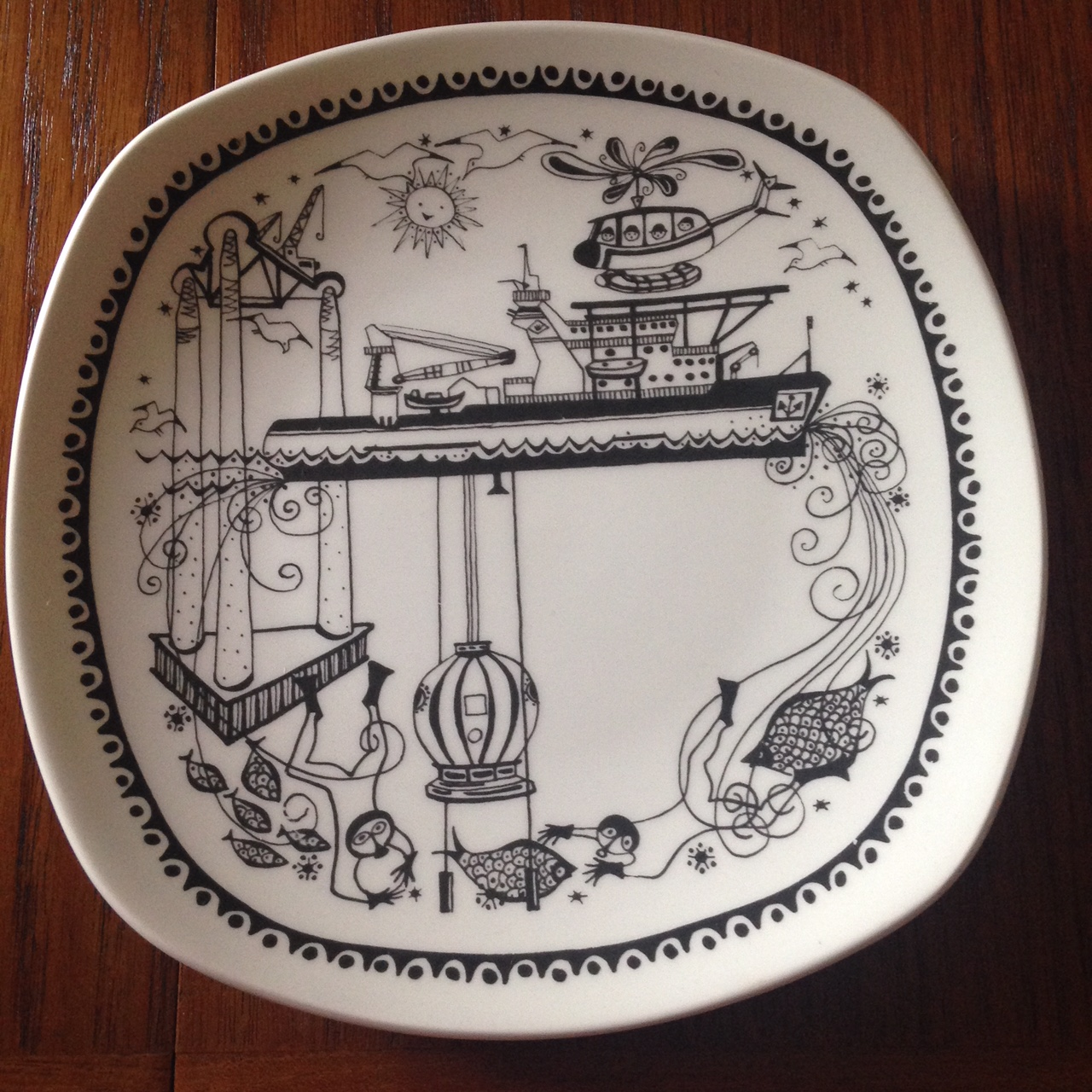
Norwegian decorative plate depicting the Wildrake in May 1979

The diving vessel Stena Welder came alongside the Wildrake to render assistance in the rescue, but its diving system was undergoing repairs and had to be hastily readied for diving. Rather than having the Stena Welder recover the bell with its own crane, Holmes and Brian Masterson elected to raise the bell with the Wildrake's crane. This necessitated that the Stena Welder rescue divers attach a guide wire to the bell, which would then be used to send the Wildrake crane hook to the bell, allowing the rescue diver to attach it to the bell with a wire sling.

At 06:09, the Stena Welder diving bell entered the water carrying rescue divers Phil Kasey-Smith and Eddy Frank. Due to communication problems, failure of the lights on the Stena Welder bell, the absence of the Wildrake bell's transponder, and the fact that the Wildrake crew had forgotten they had moved the bell away from the SALM base a few hours earlier, it took Kasey-Smith nearly an hour to find the Wildrake bell on the seafloor. At 07:55, he saw Walker and Guiel giving him thumbs up through the porthole. Kasey-Smith spent another hour directing the recovery of the slack guide wire around the SALM base. Because the Stena Welder was not a dynamic positioning (DP) vessel, it could not be held in a constant position, causing the Stena Welder bell to drag Kasey-Smith around the seabed on his umbilical. At 09:02, Kasey-Smith attached the guide wire to the bell. The Wildrake began lowering its crane hook, but Kasey-Smith now saw that Walker and Guiel's movements had become "very very frantic". The crane hook came down too far from the bell for Kasey-Smith to reach it with the wire slings attached to the hook. The hook was raised, had further slings attached, and was sent down again to Kasey-Smith, who attached the slings to the Wildrake bell at 10:10.

The Wildrake attempted to lift the bell from the bottom at a 45-degree angle rather than vertically, and without a visual confirmation that the bell was clear to be lifted. During the lift, the bell wedged against the side of the SALM base, causing the wire sling to break. The end of the crane wire emerged from the sea at 12:20 without the Wildrake bell, which was again lost. When rescue diver Frank relocated the bell, he saw that Walker or Guiel had attempted to cut the ropes on the drop weights to allow the bell to surface, but that only one of the two weights was cut free. He also saw that the stranded divers were near death.

With Kasey-Smith and Frank at the point of exhaustion, they were brought to the surface in the Stena Welder bell and relieved by divers Michael Mangan and Tony Slayman. At 18:16, Mangan reconnected the crane wire to the bell. At 19:37, the bell was lifted out of the ocean. It was docked to the Wildrake saturation system, where Morven White, who had been placed into saturation, examined Walker and Guiel and determined that they were dead. The official pronouncement of death was made by George Shirrifs, who had arrived aboard the Wildrake with White earlier that day. The divers' postmortems in Aberdeen determined that they died of hypothermia.

== Aftermath ==
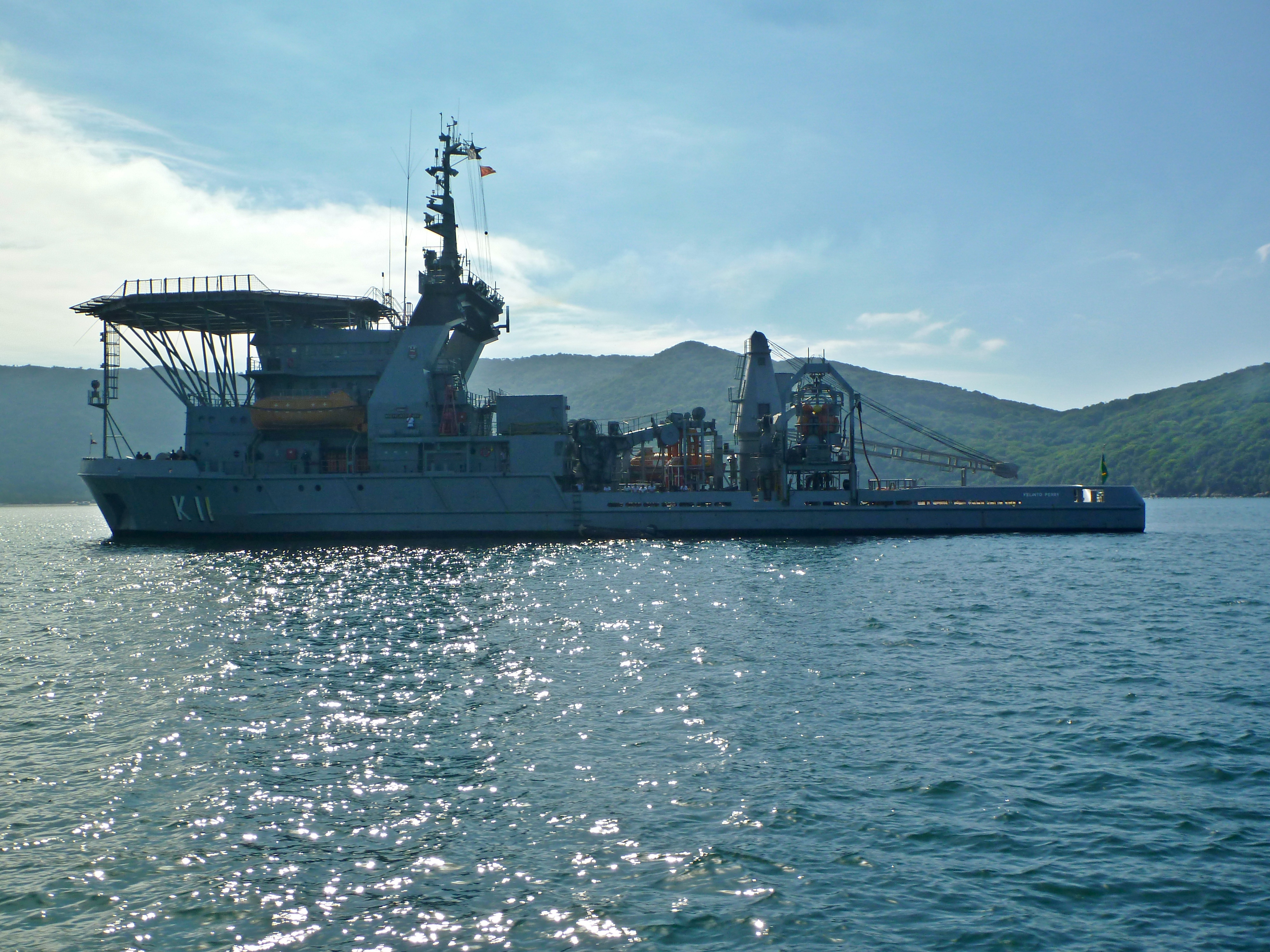
The Felinto Perry, formerly the Wildrake, in 2015

On 9 August 1979, Department of Energy (DoE) inspectors and police boarded the Wildrake to investigate the accident. DoE inspector Roy Giles found multiple safety violations and evidence of negligence. Richard Walker's widow and Victor Guiel's family retained US attorney Gerald Sterns, who filed a wrongful death complaint in the United States on 30 July 1980 against ten defendants, including Infabco Diving Services and Møllerodden AS.

On 28 November 1980, Infabco Diving Services Ltd. was indicted on criminal charges in Aberdeen Sheriff Court as the employer of Walker and Guiel. At the criminal trial, which began on 15 December 1980, the diving company used what later became known as the "Infabco defence", claiming that the divers were actually employed by a company called Offshore Co-ordinators Ltd., which was located in a bank on Jersey and registered in the Isle of Man. On 19 December 1980, Sheriff Alastair Stewart ruled that the Crown had failed to prove that Infabco was Walker and Guiel's employer. He therefore directed the jury to find Infabco not guilty.

In May 1981, the United States District Court in Los Angeles awarded compensatory damages of $475,000 to Walker's widow and daughter and $75,000 to Guiel's family. This judgement, however, would never be enforced by the British court system. A fatal accident inquiry on Walker and Guiel's deaths was held from 11 to 22 May 1981 in Aberdeen. At the inquiry, Walker's widow, Jeanne Walker, read aloud the final entry from her husband's diary, written on 7 August 1979, in which he commented, "I don't even know if I'm gonna get out of here alive." Sheriff Douglas James Risk issued his Determinations on 13 November 1981. He found that the removal of the clump weight contributed to the divers' deaths and that the absence of a bell stage indicated "that the diving contractors were more concerned with speed than with safety". He also concluded that Walker and Guiel "could probably have been saved" if Masterson had not ordered the crane lift to continue without investigating the obstruction impeding the lift, which proved to be the SALM base.

On 17 December 1981, the Thames Television current affairs series TV Eye broadcast The Last Dive, a documentary featuring investigative reporter and former Member of Parliament Bryan Gould, which alleged that an improper relationship existed between Brian Masterson and Joe Singletary, BNOC's Offshore Construction Manager at the time of the accident. On 23 July 1982, the Edinburgh law firm of Simpson and Marwick filed suit in the United Kingdom against twelve defendants on behalf of the Walker and Guiel families. In October 1986, the remaining defendants settled, agreeing to pay £293,000 to the Walkers and a much smaller amount (possibly around $8000) to the Guiels. No admission of wrongdoing was made by the defendants.

The Wildrake, renamed Felinto Perry, later became a submarine rescue ship in the Brazilian Navy. In May 2000, the Wildrake accident records in London were found to be missing.

== Sources ==
- Carson, W. G. (1982). The Other Price of Britain's Oil: Safety and Control in the North Sea. Crime, Law, and Deviance. New Brunswick, New Jersey: Rutgers University Press. ISBN 0-8135-0957-2. LCCN 81-85459.
- Limbrick, Jim (2001). North Sea Divers – a Requiem. Hertford: Authors OnLine. ISBN 0-7552-0036-5.
- Smart, Michael (2011). Into the Lion's Mouth: The Story of the Wildrake Diving Accident. Medford, Oregon: Lion's Mouth Publishing. ISBN 978-0-615-52838-0. LCCN 2011915008.

== See also ==
- Star Canopus diving accident – Fatal offshore diving bell accident in 1978
- Stena Seaspread diving accident – Saturation diving bell incident with successful rescue in the North Sea in 1981
