= Thistle SALM =

The Thistle SALM (Single Anchor Leg Mooring) was a tanker loading facility that allowed oil from the Thistle oilfield to be transported to land where a submarine export pipeline did not yet exist. It was also the site of the 8 August 1979 Wildrake diving accident that killed two divers. and the 21 January 1981 Stena Seaspread diving accident (non-fatal).

== Development ==
In February 1975, Burmah Oil decided to develop the Thistle SALM. It was conceived by Exxon, designed by Single Buoy Moorings, Inc. of Monaco and built by Motherwell Bridge Offshore in Leith, Scotland. It cost $6.4 million to build (equivalent to $25 million in 2023), and in March 1977 it was set into position by divers from Sub Sea International.

SALM components

The SALM had three major components: a 182-foot (55 m) upper section called the buoy, a 335-foot (102 m) long middle section called the riser, and a hex-shaped gravity base which anchored the facility to the seabed to prevent it from drifting away. From head to toe it was 545 feet (166 m) long. Two articulated “universal joints” allowed the buoy and the riser to pivot in rough water.

During operation, the Thistle Alpha platform fed oil to the SALM through a pair of 16-inch (41 cm) pipelines. This hard piping ran up the base from opposing sides and terminated at the bottom of the riser near the first U-joint articulation. From that point the oil bridged the articulation through a pair of very thick 16-inch flexible jumper hoses, then continued up the riser through more hard piping, and over the riser-buoy articulation through another set of jumper hoses. From there, the oil flowed through product hoses to the shuttle tanker which was moored to the buoy.

== Damage ==
The SALM was installed in March 1977, but did not go into operation until February 1978 when Thistle Alpha began producing oil. Then, on 15 October 1978, a pin-hole leak was discovered in some pipework on the inside of the buoy during a routine maintenance inspection. Preparations were undertaken to fix the leak, but poor weather conditions interrupted the repair work.

Over the winter months the pin-hole leak developed into a split, and a crack in the 16-inch pipework outside the buoy allowed water and oil to flood the central trunkway. This caused the buoy to lose more of its buoyancy. The loss of buoyancy in turn caused the upper U-joint to go into compression which allowed the 2,404-pound (1,090 kg) U-joint pin to wrench itself free.

On 17 January 1979, it was reported that the buoy was not standing up straight anymore. A diver was sent down to investigate and discovered that the U-joint pin had fallen out. The only thing keeping the buoy from floating away were the jumper hoses bridging the articulation. Three days later, after the buoy sustained more flooding, a diver reported that the buoy was now actually grounding on top of the riser.

== Recovery operation ==
Alarmed by this news, the owners of the SALM, British National Oil Corporation, immediately notified Chuck Alexander, the project engineer responsible for the 1977 installation of the SALM, and ordered him to mount an emergency rescue of the 340-metric ton buoy before it sustained irreparable damage, or worse, broke free and became a shipping hazard.

Alexander flew to Aberdeen, and by the next day he was taken out to the diving support vessel Tender Carrier in the Thistle Field. On board the Carrier, Alexander ultimately decided to have the jumper hoses blown off with explosives. Explosives experts were brought out to the ship with their gear and divers placed clamshell charges around the jumper hoses. On 23 January 1979, the signal was given and Alexander heard a bang and saw bubbles come to the surface. A diver was sent down to have a look and discovered that, although both charges had gone off, only one of the hoses had been cut.

With the buoy listing even more precariously, divers undertook the dangerous task of unbolting the remaining hose. Shackles were attached to the top of the buoy, and the buoy was raised out of the water and placed onto the deck of the Pearl Marine.

BNOC ordered an inspection of the top of the riser to see if it had sustained any damage. An ROV (Remotely Operated Vehicle—a kind of mobile robot with a video camera) was sent down to make a video inspection, and the report came back that the riser had sustained no damage. With the emergency over, the inspection tape was mailed to Alexander in London.

Several weeks later, Alexander viewed the tape and discovered that one of the clamshell charges had blown a big hole in the top of the riser. The explosion had also rocked one of the 16-inch flow lines out of its clamps, displacing it 30 feet (9 m) below its original position. BNOC would later contract the massive semi-submersible workshop, Narwhal, on a “no cure, no pay” basis to remove the riser and take it to shore.

On 20 March 1979, BNOC authorized the repair and re-installation of the Thistle SALM. Five months later, divers Richard A. Walker and Victor F. "Skip" Guiel Jr. were killed during the re-installation of the SALM in the Wildrake diving accident.
