= William Westall =

British artist

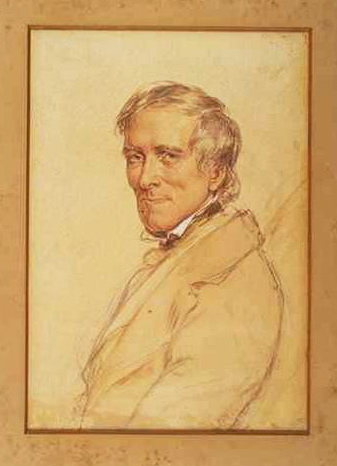
- Portrait of William Westall ARA, by his son Robert Westall, c. 1845.
- Born: 12 October 1781; Hertford, England
- Died: 22 January 1850 (aged 68); Hampstead, London
- Education: Royal Academy
- Known for: Landscape art
- Movement: Picturesque

William Westall ARA (12 October 1781 – 22 January 1850) was a British landscape artist best known as one of the first artists to work in Australia.

== Early life ==
Westall was born in Hertford and grew up in London, mostly Sydenham and Hampstead. The son of brewery manager Benjamin Westall (d.1794) and his second wife Martha née Harbord, William Westall had four step-siblings, the eldest of whom, Richard Westall, was a reputable painter and illustrator. William was interested in painting from a young age; Rienitz and Rienitz (1963) suggest that he looked up to his half-brother, and was ambitious to follow in his footsteps. There is evidence to suggest that Westall's parents did not support this career choice; however Richard became head of the family upon the death of Benjamin Westall in March 1794, and must have approved Westall's artistic ambitions, as from that time forward William Westall was given a thorough art education. At the age of sixteen he won a silver palette in a competition run by the Society of Artists of Great Britain, and at eighteen was enrolled at the prestigious Royal Academy.

== Voyages ==
In 1800, whilst still a probationary student in his first year, Westall was approached by Sir Joseph Banks to serve as landscape and figure painter to a voyage of exploration under Matthew Flinders, aboard HMS Investigator. The position had first been offered to Julius Caesar Ibbetson, who declined; and then William Daniell, who accepted but subsequently pulled out. Daniell was a fellow student of Westall, and was engaged to one of Westall's stepsisters, so it seems likely that Westall prevailed upon Daniell to recommend him as his replacement; however one source states that Westall was recommended by Benjamin West, President of the Royal Academy. Elisabeth Findlay reconciles these claims by suggesting that Daniell "contrived" to have West put Westall's name forward.

Westall's nomination was approved by Banks; thus Westall, at just 19 years of age, was appointed to what has come to be regarded as one of the notable scientific expeditions ever undertaken, as a member of a team of scientists that included botanist Robert Brown and botanical artist Ferdinand Bauer, both now revered as amongst the very best in their respective fields.

=== Madeira ===
Leaving London on 18 July 1801, the expedition reached Madeira, its first landfall, on 1 August. The following day Flinders, Brown and Bauer rowed to Bugio Island. The gardener Good records that he was not permitted to go with them, so instead he and Westall rowed around Investigator in search of turtles and birds, obtaining one of each. A day later Investigator anchored at Funchal, Madeira Island, and the following morning Westall went ashore with the other scientists, walking around Funchal and the vineyards north and east of the town. The next day the scientists went ashore again, with the intention of climbing the highest peak, Pico Ruivo. They walked all day, then spent an uncomfortable night in an unfurnished room in a chapel, probably the old chapel at Alegría. Early the next morning Westall returned alone to Funchal, the others continuing on for a few hours before turning back.

Westall was charmed by the island and seems to have been enthusiastic in his work. However, on returning to the ship, their boat was swamped, Westall was almost drowned, and all of his sketches were lost. This event seems to have profoundly affected him: it is claimed that he subsequently nearly died from exposure and stress, and even three years later he was claiming that "his head had been affected" by the accident. Throughout his life he maintained that the swamping was a deliberate act.

=== Cape Colony ===
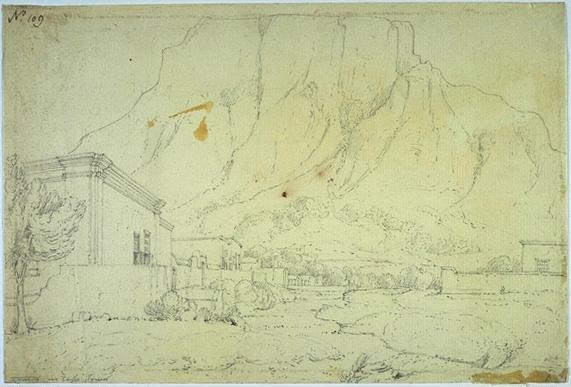
Cape of Good Hope, View at the Foot of Table Mountain, 1801

The next landfall was at Simon's Town, in the Cape Colony just east of the Cape of Good Hope. Anchoring in False Bay on 16 October, Investigator remained eighteen days, during which time the scientists spent a good deal of time ashore. Nothing is known of Westall's movements in the first week, but Good, travelling with Brown, Bauer and ship's surgeon Hugh Bell, reports falling in with him at Devil's Peak on 26 October, Westall having set out from Simon's Town with mineralogist John Allen two days earlier; the two men had become separated, and Westall had "fared very indifferently and slept one night at Constantia." The following day Westall accompanied Bauer and Bell towards Cape Town, while Good and Brown climbed Table Mountain. Good and Brown slept that night in the Tokai home of a German named Johann Gasper Loos, and woke in the morning to find Westall and Bell there too, the latter two having lost their way to Cape Town, and arrived at Loos' house late in the evening. All four men then returned to the ship together.

As with Madeira, Westall was delighted with the landscapes on offer at the Cape, and worked conscientiously, making some highly detailed sketches. Seven of Westall's field drawings from the Cape are extant.

=== Australia ===
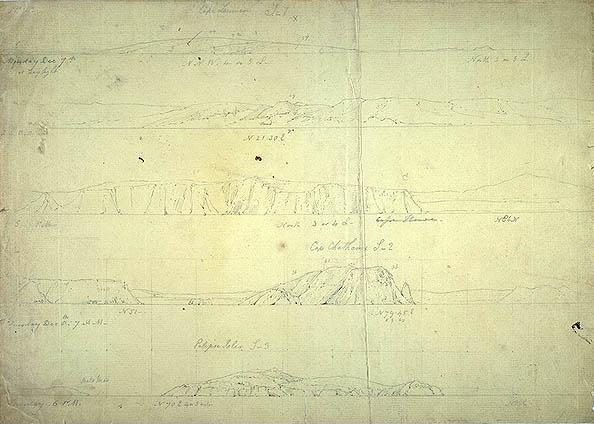
South Coast: Cape Leeuwin, Cape Chatham and Eclipse Isles, Westall's first sketch of an Australian landscape

Investigator came in sight of Australia on 6 December, and the following morning Westall made his first sketch of Australia, a coastal profile from about 15 kilometres (9.3 mi) off Cape Leeuwin. He made two further coastal profiles the following day, one of Chatham Island (Western Australia), the other of the Eclipse Islands. Late that night the Investigator anchored alongside Seal Island in King George the Third's Sound (now King George Sound); they remained in King George Sound for almost four weeks.

The next morning, the 9th, Westall sketched Seal Island from the anchorage. Later that day he went with Flinders and others, firstly to examine Seal Island and search for a bottle and parchment that George Vancouver had left there ten years previously. They then went across to Possession Point and the opposite shore, and examined Princess Royal Harbour.

Not much is known of Westall's subsequent movements, but on 14 December he was on shore with Brown, Good, Westall, Allen, and possibly Bauer and a man named White, when they made the first contact with an Australian Aborigine, who initially advanced on them, shouting and brandishing a spear, but then retreated before them, setting fire to the grass behind him. On 23 December Westall was one of a large party who set off on a grueling two-day overland expedition to Torbay Inlet and back.

By 30 December Investigator's men had established amicable relations with the Aborigines. That day Westall sketched an Aboriginal man named Warena, and showed it to him. Warena was pleased, and bared his body to the waist so that Westall could complete the drawing. A sketch of an Aboriginal man survives, and Rienitz and Rienitz assume that this is Warena, but Vallance et al. (2001) note that the sketch does not match Brown's description of Warena as a "middle aged stout man".

On 1 January 1802, Westall landed with Bauer, apparently in company with Brown, and apparently at Limeburner Point. Westall and Bauer subsequently went exploring together, and discovered the Western Australian Pitcher Plant (Cephalotus follicularis).

From this time on, the surviving drawings by Westall decrease markedly in both number and quality. Findlay assumed that nearly all of Westall's drawings have survived, and sees the Westall's low output as indicative of his growing disillusionment with the Australian landscape, which he perceived as lacking in the picturesque qualities he sought. Rienitz and Rienitz, on the other hand, perceive Westall as diligent enough, and assume that many of his drawing have been lost.

Only five sketches and a watercolour are extant from Westall's time in King George's Sound, and he seems to have made only one sketch during the five days spent in Lucky Bay. At Cape Catastrophe, where eight men were drowned, Westall sketched Thistle Island, and painted a snake.

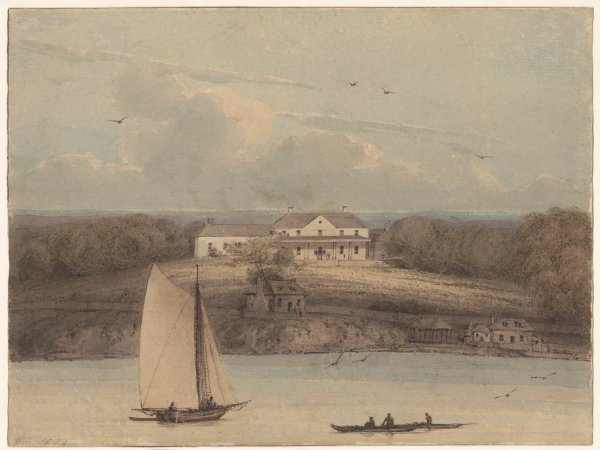
Sydney: Government House, 1802

The arrival of Investigator at the settlement at Port Jackson (now Sydney) on 8 May 1802 seems to have revitalised Westall. During there ten-week hiatus there, he produced a great deal of work, including no fewer than thirteen detailed drawings of the Hawkesbury River, with which he was much taken. He also sketched some local Aborigines, and was commissioned by the Governor, Phillip Gidley King, to paint Government House. The resulting watercolour is one of a very few paintings that Westall completed during the voyage.

Heading north up the east coast, Westall continued drawing coastal profiles, but put less effort in than ever. Anchoring in Port Bowen on 21 August, the scientists went ashore to explore, and Flinders offered to name the highest mountain over whoever reached the peak first. Westall won; hence the name of Mount Westall. Continuing north, Investigator found a passage through the Great Barrier Reef, passed through Torres Strait, and anchored off Murray Island, where about fifty Torres Strait Islanders came out in canoes to trade. From this time onward, Westall largely eschewed landscapes in favour of portraying events and people. Amongst his work in this period is the watercolour Murray Isles, which depicts the islanders coming out to trade; The English Company's Islands: Probasso, a Malay Chief, a portrait of a Macassan trepanger chieftain; and several watercolour copies of Aboriginal cave paintings. The last of these makes Westall the first European artist to depict Aboriginal cave paintings, and, more generally, one of the first Europeans to document Aboriginal artwork when on 14 January 1803 Flinders' party made landfall on Chasm Island.

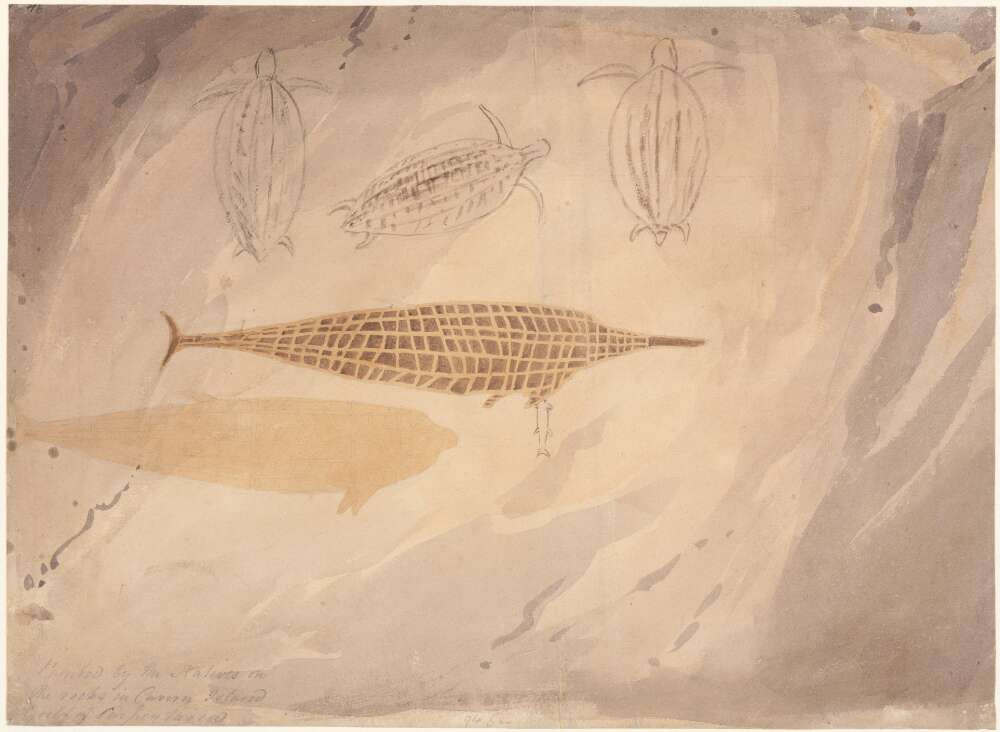
William Westall (1803) Chasm Island, native cave painting, 1803, watercolour

Within the island's rock shelters, they discovered an array of painted and stenciled patterns and Flinders enlisted Westall to record these images. In his journal, Flinders not only detailed the location and the artworks but also authored the inaugural site report:

In the deep sides of the chasms were deep holes or caverns undermining the cliffs; upon the walls of which I found rude drawings, made with charcoal and something like red paint upon the white ground of the rock. These drawings represented porpoises, turtle, kanguroos [sic], and a human hand; and Mr. Westall, who went afterwards to see them, found the representation of a kanguroo [sic], with a file of thirty-two persons following after it. The third person of the band was twice the height of the others, and held in his hand something resembling the whaddie, or wooden sword of the natives of Port Jackson; and was probably intended to represent a chief. They could not, as with us, indicate superiority by clothing or ornament, since they wore none of any kind; and therefore, with the addition of a weapon, similar to the ancients, they seem to have made superiority of person the principal emblem of superior power, of which, indeed, power is usually a consequence in the very early stages of society.

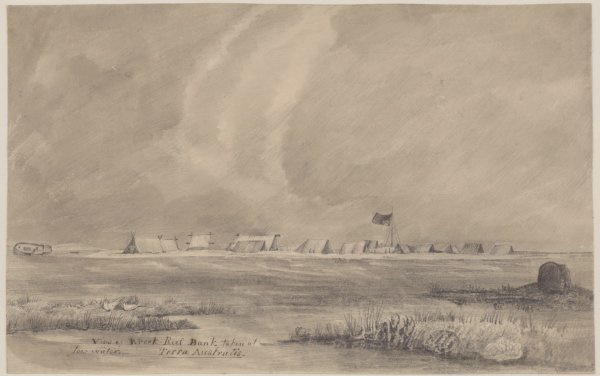
View of Wreck Reef Bank Taken at Low Water: Terra Australis, 1803

By the time Flinders had finished surveying the Gulf of Carpentaria, Investigator was rotting badly, and Flinders reluctantly decided to return to Port Jackson via the west and south coasts. Arriving back at Port Jackson in June 1803, Investigator was condemned, and Flinders decided to return to England to request a new ship. Though some of the scientists elected to remain in Port Jackson and await Flinders' return, Westall joined Flinders as a passenger on HMS Porpoise. They set sail on 10 August, but a week later the ship was wrecked on the Wreck Reefs, and the crew and passengers were marooned on a narrow sandbank for nearly three weeks while Flinders returned to Port Jackson in Porpoise's cutter to obtain help. Two rescue ships were sent: Cumberland, which was instructed to return to Port Jackson; and Rolla, which was en route to Canton. Westall decided to board the latter.

Very few of Westall's drawings were lost in the wreck, though some were water-damaged, and incurred further damage when Flinders' second lieutenant and brother Samuel Flinders allowed the sheep to run over them while Westall had them laid out drying in the sun. Whilst marooned on the sandbank, Westall produced a watercolour entitled View of Wreck Reef Bank Taken at Low Water: Terra Australia; this was Westall's final drawing of the voyage.

=== China and India ===
Westall arrived in Canton at the end of 1803. Rather than returning immediately to England, he spend some time exploring Canton, then sailed on to India. As he was on the British government payroll at the time, he had no right to do so without permission, and must have known it, since, just before departing for India, he wrote a long letter to Banks justifying his travel plans. In doing so he complained about the monotony of the Australian landscape, declared that he would not have agreed to the position if he had known that the voyage was confined to Australia alone, and hinted that he had the right to go to India as compensation for the failure of the Investigator to stop anywhere interesting. The admiralty took a dim view of the letter, terminating his employment immediately, and telling him to make his own way home.

=== Madeira and Jamaica ===
Westall returned to England at the end of 1804, only to learn that Flinders was imprisoned on Mauritius. Realising that he would not be asked to work his sketches up for some time, he sailed once more to Madeira, and then on to Jamaica, returning to England in 1806.

== Career ==
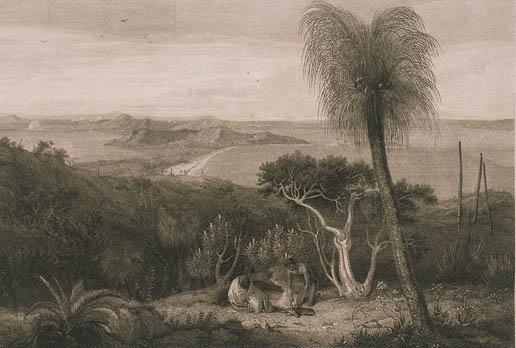
View from the South Side of King George's Sound, an engraving by John Byrne after Westall, first published in Flinders' A Voyage to Terra Australis

By 1809, the Admiralty were feeling pressure to show some results of the voyage; yet Flinders still had not been released by the French, so a published account of the voyage was still some years off. To fill the void, the Admiralty commissioned Westall to produce nine oil paintings of Australian scenes. These took Westall three years to complete. A selection were exhibited in 1810, and again in 1812, and as a result Westall won election as an Associate of the Royal Academy. When work on Flinders' A Voyage to Terra Australis got underway in 1811, it was Westall's oil paintings that became the basis of the engravings to be published therein. Westall himself took responsibility for squaring down the paintings to drawings of the actual size to be published, and these were then handed over to engravers, who produced intaglio plates using a combination of etching and direct engraving. A Voyage to Terra Australis was eventually published in 1814, and shortly afterwards Westall published the engravings separately under the title Views of Australian Scenery.

In 1811 Westall published Foreign Scenery, a collection of landscapes depicting Madeira, the Cape of Good Hope, China and India. This was a financially successful venture, and attracted the attention of publisher Rudolf Ackermann, who approached him to contribute to several of his works. Westall ended up doing a good deal of work for Ackermann, including views of several universities and public schools for Ackermann's series of school histories; and over a hundred drawing for Great Britain Illustrated (1830). He also worked for John Murray, such as several contributions to A Picturesque Tour of the River Thames (for which he shared authorship with Samuel Owen 1828).

== Later life ==
Self-portrait of William Westall, c. 1820

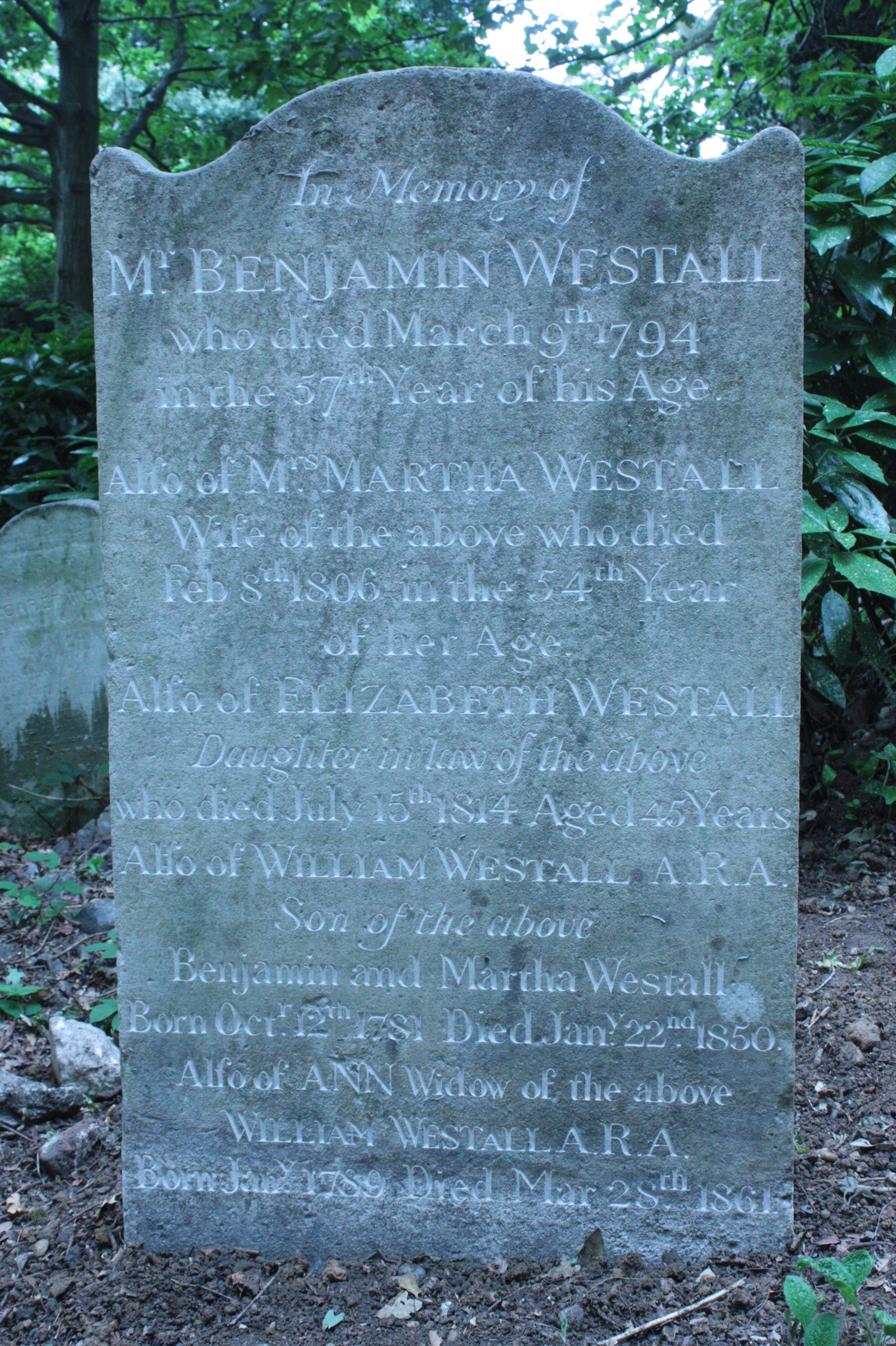
The grave of William Westall, High Hampstead, London

In 1820, Westall married Ann Sedgwick; they had four sons, William, Thomas, Richard and Robert, who was also an artist. Supporting his family became the prime imperative of Westall's later life, and it is said that he often complained that he had sacrificed the chance of fame and success in order to earn a steady income in illustration.

Westall's health began to decline in the 1840s, and in 1847 he broke his arm. He never recovered from this setback, finding it difficult to continue working. He gave his final exhibition in 1848, and died in January 1850, aged 68. His grave is in the graveyard of St John-at-Hampstead in north London, south of the church.

In 1899, Westall's sons sold 140 of the original drawings from the voyage of HMS Investigator to the Royal Colonial Institute (later the Royal Commonwealth Society) for 100 guineas. In 1968 they were published as Drawing of William Westall; later that year they were purchased by the National Library of Australia for 38,000 pounds.

== Assessment of his work ==
Westall's work during the voyage of the Investigator has been the subject of much analysis and comment, most of it critical. In terms of output, the 140 drawing he produced during the voyage compares unfavourably with the 2000 sketches produced by Bauer in the same period. Moreover, some of Westall's drawings are so lacking in detail as to appear almost cursory. He has also been criticised for his choice of subjects: his primary task was to record landscapes, but in the latter half of the voyage he mostly neglected them in favour of portraying people and events.

But the main criticism levelled against Westall's Investigator work relates to his taking of artistic license. There was an expectation that Westall's pictures would serve as accurate objective records, and in many cases they are: his coastal profiles in particular have been praised for their accuracy. In some cases, however, Westall has introduced substantial inaccuracies. When an Aborigine was shot in the back, Westall's sketch showed the gunshot wound in the chest; and his sketch of Wreck Reef shows emergent coral reef, when in fact the coral remained always underwater.

These inaccuracies were compounded when Westall came to convert his sketches into oil paintings. A devotee of the picturesque aesthetic ideal, Westall sought to impose this ideal upon the Australian landscape. To this end he manipulated the foreground of his paintings heavily, rearranging and inserting features to obtain a desirable composition. Examples include his Entrance to Port Lincoln from behind Memory Cove, February 1802, which superimposes the foreground from one sketch of Port Lincoln upon the background of another; and his Part of King George Sound, on the South Coast of New Holland, which is based upon his drawing of King George's Sound, but has a completely revised foreground, including the insertion of a Eucalyptus that Westall sketched at Spencer Gulf, 1800 kilometres to the east.

Westall's later work has not been subjected to much critical analysis, but his contemporary and friend John Landseer considered that he was under-rated, and a better artist than William Hodges and John Webber, the artists on James Cook's second and third expeditions respectively. Landseer thought that Westall would have received more recognition, were he not "a mild and unobtrusive man, whilst the others were pushing and solicitous".

== Publications ==
For a list of publications illustrated by Westall, see Wikisource:Author:William Westall.

== See also ==
- European and American voyages of scientific exploration

== Sources ==
- Brown, Robert; Vallance, T. G.; Moore, D. T.; Groves, E. W. (2001). Orchard, Tony; Wilson, Annette (eds.). Nature's Investigator: The Diary of Robert Brown in Australia, 1801–1805. Canberra: Australian Biographical Resources Study. ISBN 0-642-56817-0.
- Estensen, Miriam (2003). Matthew Flinders. Allen & Unwin. ISBN 1-74114-152-4.
- Findlay, Elizabeth (1998). Arcadian Quest: William Westall's Australian Sketches. National Library of Australia. ISBN 0-642-10798-X.
- Flinders, Matthew (1814). A Voyage to Terra Australis: Undertaken for the Purpose of Completing the Discovery of that Vast Country, and Prosecuted in the Years 1801, 1802, and 1803, in His Majesty's Ship the Investigator. London: G. Nicol & Son. LCCN 04032254. OCLC 1931791. Wikidata Q133873351.
- Good, Peter (1981). Edwards, Phyllis I. (ed.). The Journal of Peter Good. Bulletin of the British Museum (Natural History) History Series. Vol. 9. London: British Museum (Natural History). ISBN 0-908120-45-1. ISSN 0068-2306.
- Rienitz, Rex & Rienitz, Thea (1963). "Chapter 4: William Westall". Early Artists of Australia. pp. 80–123.
