= Death of Bradley Westell =

Fatal diving accident in the North Sea in 1995

- Date: 31 July 1995
- Location: North Sea, Scotland
- Cause: Umbilical drawn into vessel thruster
- Participants: Bradley Westell
- Deaths: 1 (Westell)
- Trial: As to hindering or frustrating an investigation, or dishonest conduct short of perjury (perverting the course of justice): Case No. T960640, Regina v. Kenneth Roberts

Bradley Westell (1965/6 – 31 July 1995) was a British commercial diver who died in the North Sea off Bacton, Norfolk after his umbilical was dragged into one of the thrusters of the diving support vessel Stena Orelia. This indirectly led to the 1997 conviction of diving supervisor Kenneth Roberts for perverting the course of justice, and first prison sentence for a crime offshore working in the North Sea oil industry.
