= East Shetland Basin =

Oil field in the United Kingdom

The East Shetland Basin is a major oil-producing area of the North Sea between Scotland and Norway. It extends from 60°10′ N to 61°45′ N and 1°36′ E to 3°0′ E. It is 111.3 km north–south and at its maximum 55.8 km east–west.

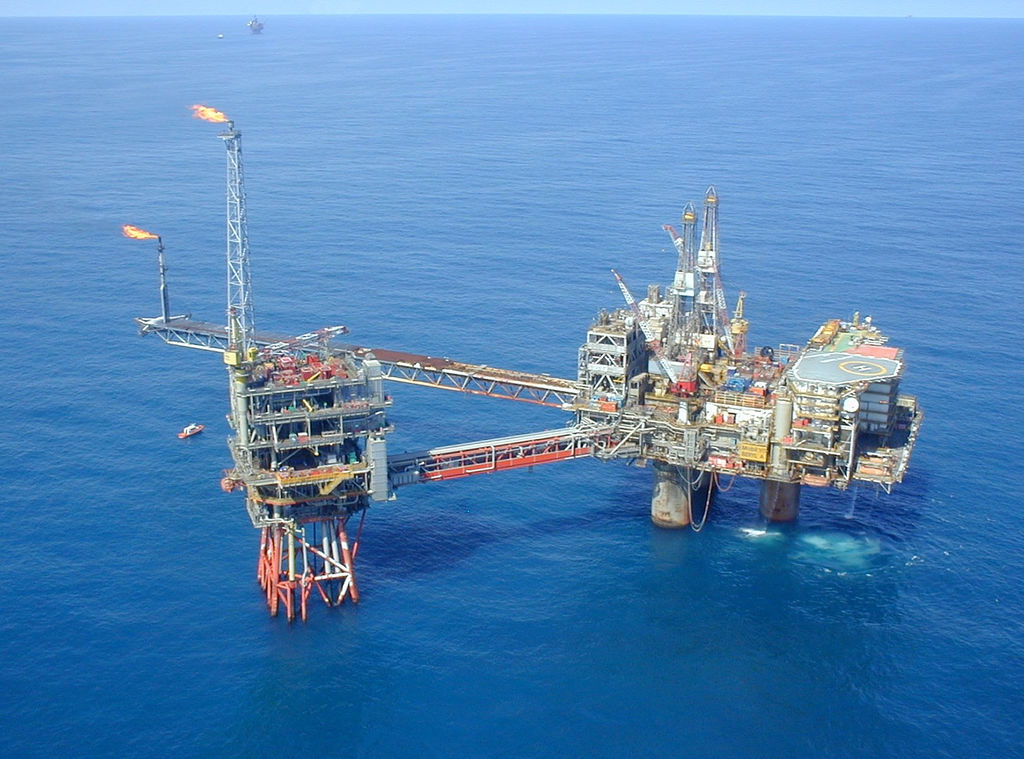
ExxonMobil's Beryl alpha oil platform in the East Shetland Basin

Oil produced in the UK area is landed at Sullom Voe Terminal in the Shetland Islands. Associated gas flows via the FLAGS pipeline to St Fergus Gas Terminal.

== Formation ==
The North Sea Basin is a major oil and gas producing area that has been exploited by Denmark, Norway and the United Kingdom. The basin was formed in the Mesozoic period by tectonic activity during the break up of Eurasia and North America. The northern area of the basin, where significant oil reserves are situated, is known as the Viking Graben. Tilted fault blocks and basins at the northern end of the Viking Graben is the area known as the East Shetland Basin. The oil fields are located at the crests of the blocks, which are of the Triassic to Middle Jurassic age. The source of the oil and gas is the Upper Jurassic (Kimmeridge Clay) shales.

== Oil and Gas Fields ==
The UK East Shetland Basin includes the following oil and gas fields and accumulations:

- Alwyn North
- Barra
- Brent
- Broom
- Causeway
- Cheviot
- Cladhan
- Conrie
- Cormorant
- Deveron
- Don
- Dunbar
- Eider
- Ellon
- Falcon
- Fionn
- Grant
- Harris
- Heather
- Hudson
- Hutton
- Islay
- Jura
- Kestrel
- Kraken
- Lyell
- Magnus
- Merlin
- Murchison
- Ninian
- Nuggets
- Orlando
- Otter
- Pelican
- Penguin
- Playfair
- Rhum
- Strathspey
- Tern
- Thistle
- Ythan

== Quadrants and Blocks ==
The UK part of the East Shetland Basin extends over the following Quadrants and Blocks:

- 210/15, 210/20, 210/24, 210/25, 210/30
- 211/7a, 211/8, 211/11 to 211/15 (inclusive), 211/21 to 211/30 (inclusive),
- 2/5, 2/10, 2/15
- 3/1 to 3/20 (inclusive), 3/24

To the East of the UK/Norway median line the East Shetland Basin extends over the following Norwegian Quadrants:

- 25, 30, 31, 33, 34, 36.

This includes the following fields: Statfjord, Snorre, Alpha, Beta, Delta, Gullfaks.

== Hydrography ==
As the northern limit of the North Sea the East Shetland Basin plays an important role in the inflow and outflow of water to and from the North Sea. The East Shetland Atlantic Inflow is an alternating inflow of water from the North Atlantic current and the continental shelf edge Slope current. These enter the East Shetland Basin from the north and flow anti-clockwise. The alternating flow affects the salinity of the water which in turn affects the population of zooplankton species such as Calanus finmarchicus which increase in the Spring. Part of the Slope Current enters the East Shetland Basin from the north east and flows south to the east of the north-flowing Norwegian coastal current. The Fair Isle Current originates on the east of the Shetland Islands and flows south in an anti-clockwise pattern.

== East Shetland Platform ==
The East Shetland Platform is the area between East Shetland Basin and the Shetland Islands. It includes Quadrants 1, 2, 209 and 210. The Platform includes rocks of the Palaeozoic and Triassic successions which have significant variation of thickness. This may indicate areas where hydrocarbons are trapped.

== See also ==
- Energy policy of the United Kingdom
- Energy use and conservation in the United Kingdom
- List of North Sea Oil and Gas Fields
