= Statfjord oil field =

Oil and gas field in the North Sea

Statfjord
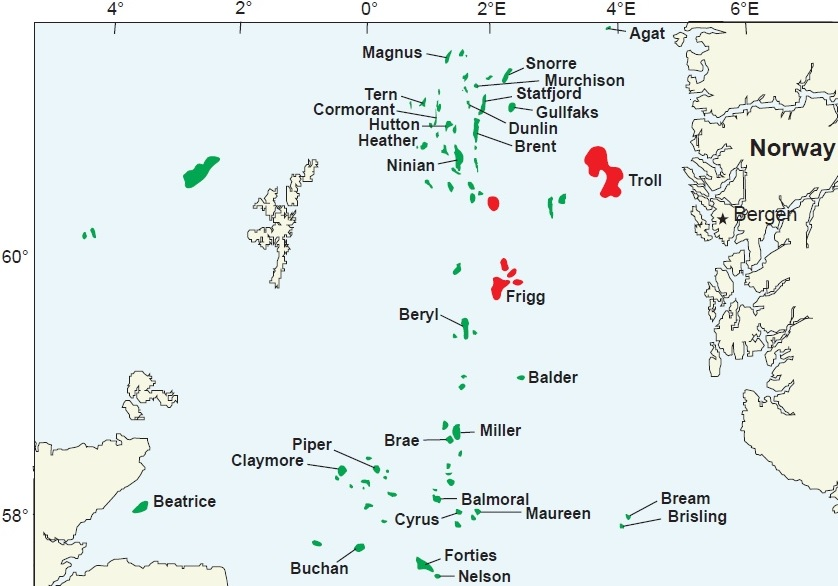
- North Sea Fields

- Location within North Sea
- Country: Norway, Scotland
- Region: North Sea
- Offshore/onshore: Offshore
- Coordinates: 61°15′20″N 1°51′14″E
- Operator: Equinor

Field history
- Start of production: 1979
- Peak of production: January 16, 1987
- Abandonment: 2032

Production
- Current production of oil: 70,000 barrels per day (~3.5×10^{6} t/a)
- Current production of gas: none

The Statfjord oil field is a large oil and gas field covering 580 km^{2} along the U.K.-Norwegian boundary of the North Sea at a water depth of 145 m, discovered in 1974 by Mobil and since 1987 operated by Equinor.

It is a trans-median field crossing the Norwegian and UK North Sea Boundary with approximately 15% being in the UK Continental Shelf waters. At peak production it produces over 700,000 barrels (110,000 m^{3}) of oil per day. Oil is loaded offshore and taken directly to refineries; gas is transported via the Statpipe pipeline to mainland Norway.

== Geology ==
The field is located in the northern part of the Viking Graben, north of the Viking Trough and east of the East Shetland Platform, in the same general area as the Brent oilfield discovered in 1971, and the Cormorant oilfield, Thistle oil field, Dunlin oilfield, Heather oil field and the Hutton oilfield, all discovered by 1973. A regional grid of reflection seismology lines showed the Brent structural trend extended into the area, forming a "large northeast-trending and northwesterly tilted" (at 6-8 degrees) Fault block, partly eroded on the east flank, with Jurassic and Cretaceous shales trapping any oil in the Middle Jurassic Brent deltaic and Late Triassic-Early Jurassic Statfjord fluvial sandstones originating from the Kimmeridge Clay Formation. The field is on the same structural trend but separated from the Brent field, 20 km to the southwest, by normal faulting and a structural saddle.

A Conoco 211/24-1 well drilled in 1972-1973 on the U.K. side of the structure turned out to be downdip to the Oil-water contact and it was not until the April 1974 Mobil well 33/12-1, on the Norwegian side, that oil was discovered in 160 m of Brent Formation. A second well "established an oil-water contact at 2584 m subsea" and a third well discovered a 127 m oil column in the Statfjord Formation with an oil-water contact 2806 m subsea.

== Production ==
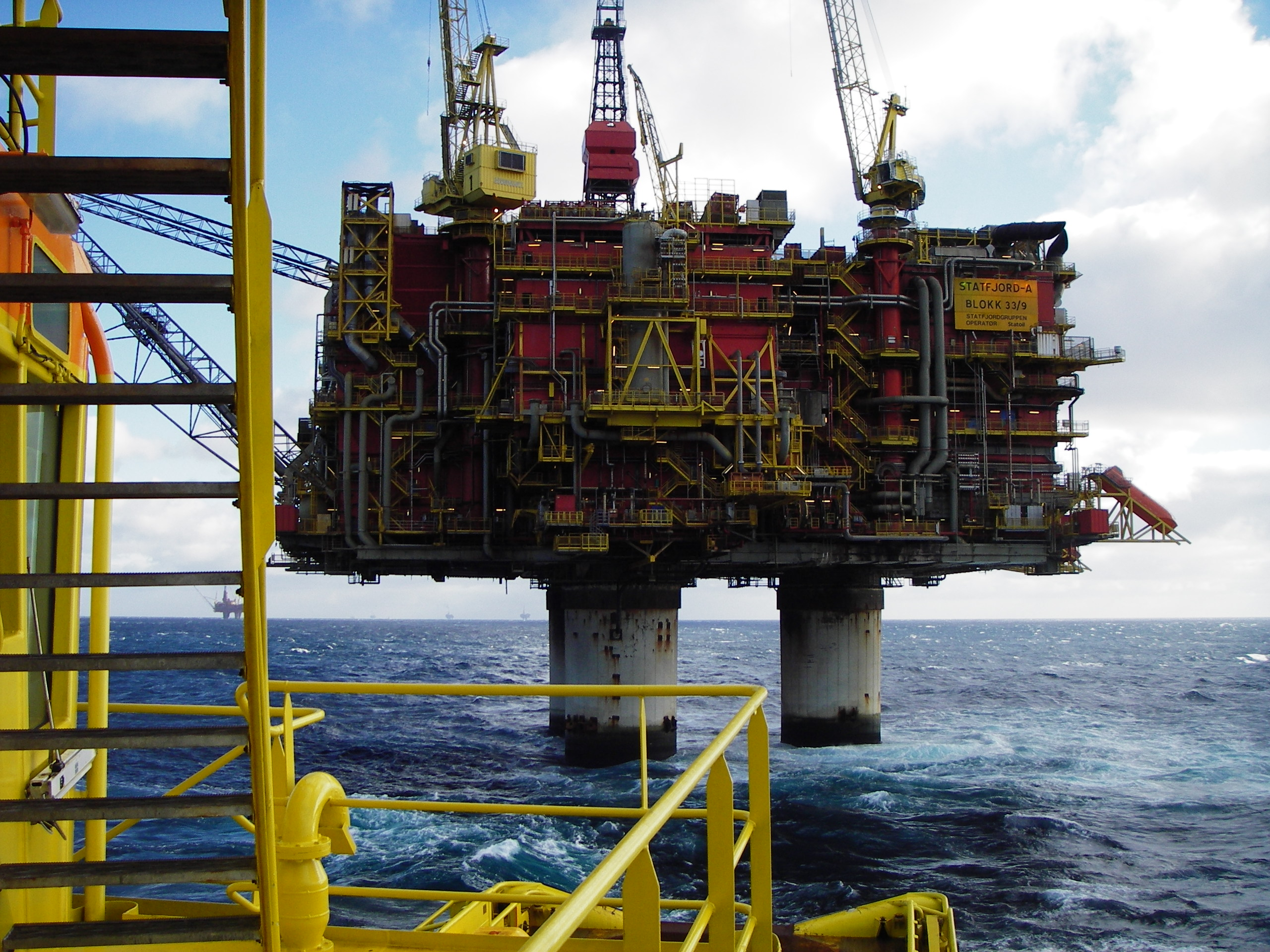
Statfjord A in the North Sea

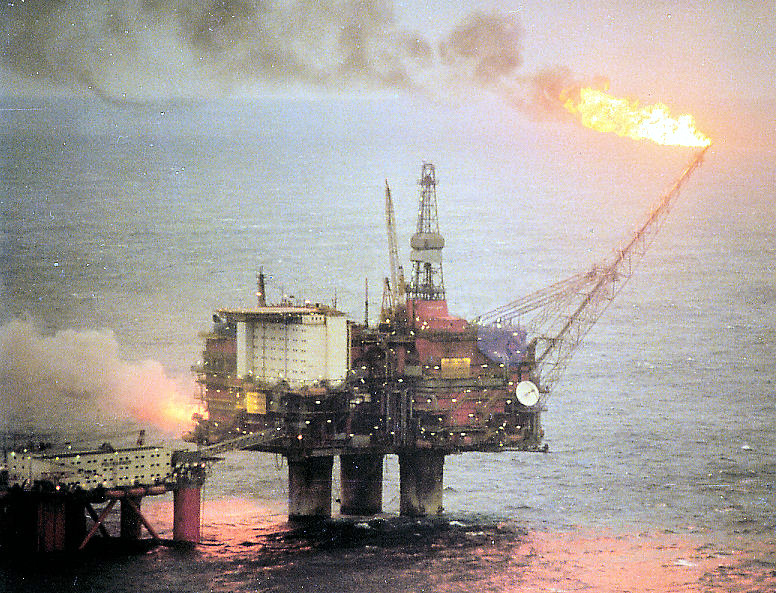
Statfjord A in 1982

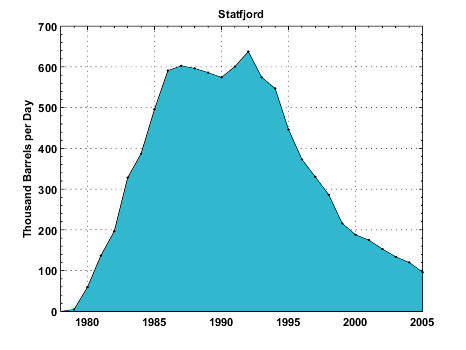
Statfjord annual oil production

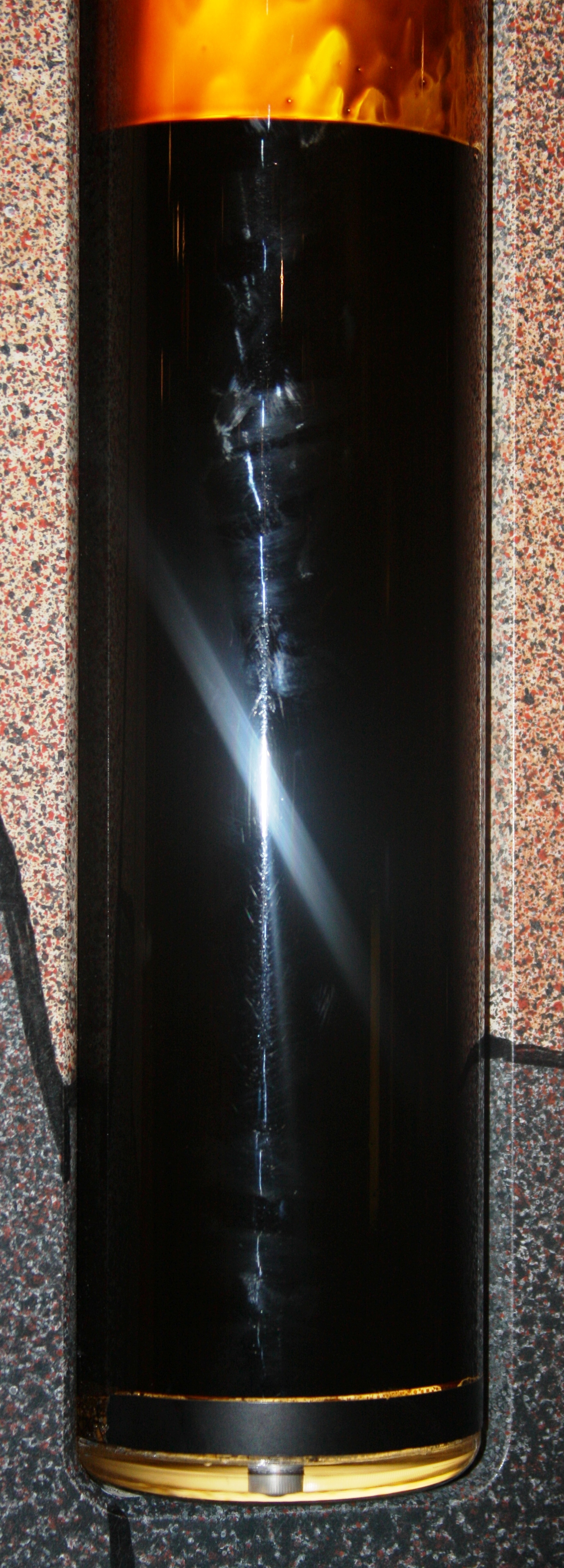
Oil from the Statfjord field

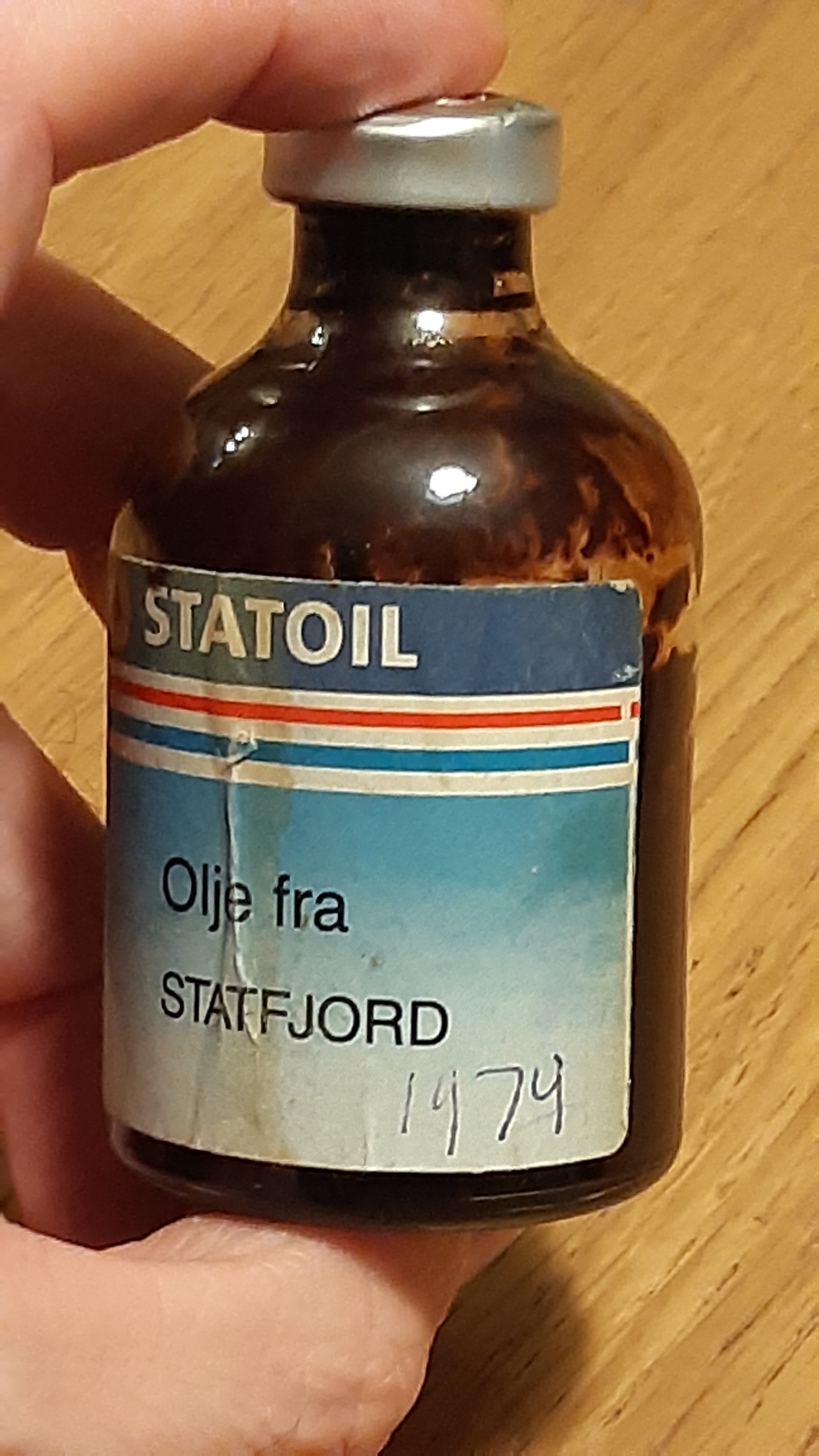
Sample of the first oil produced in the Statfjord field in 1979.

The Statfjord field has three condeep concrete production platforms, A, B and C. Each platform is made up of approximately 250,000 tonnes of concrete with 40,000 tonnes of top-side processing and accommodation facilities.

Statfjord holds the record for the highest daily production ever recorded for a European oil field (outside Russia) : 850,204 barrels (135,171.6 m^{3}) (crude oil plus natural gas liquids) were produced on January 16, 1987.

Statfjord holds one more record - the biggest single contract in Norwegian history for the construction of Statfjord B platform

Statoil has planned the "late life" of the field and expects to ultimately recover 68% of Oil in Place. but more than 60% have been produced already, leaving modest oil reserves in the order of 300 million barrels (48×10^{6} m^{3}), so the focus will now be placed on extracting the associated natural gas that had been re-injected into the field all over its life. As a mainly natural gas producer, Statfjord is scheduled to remain active until 2032.

== Statfjord oil spill ==
In December 2007, thousands of tonnes of oil were spilled into the North Sea during the loading of a tanker at the Statfjord oil field. The spill, estimated at 21,750 barrels (approx 3,000 metric tons), was the country's second largest ever, according to Norway's oil safety authority. The accident happened in rough weather while the tanker Navion Britannica was loading oil from a storage buoy, according to the operator Equinor. Production had not been affected.

== See also ==
- List of oil and gas fields of the North Sea
- List of oil spills
