= Brent System =

Location
- Country: Scotland, United Kingdom
- Direction: north-south-west
- Start: North Sea oilfields
- Passes through: Cormorant Alpha
- To: Sullom Voe Terminal

General information
- Type: oil
- Operator: TAQA Bratani

Technical information
- Length: 147 km (91 mi)
- Maximum discharge: 100,000 bbl/d (16,000 m^{3}/d)
- Diameter: 36 in (914 mm)

The Brent System pipeline transports oil from the North Sea oilfields via Cormorant Alpha to the Sullom Voe Terminal in Shetland, Scotland. Since 3 August 2009, it is operated by Abu Dhabi National Energy Company replacing the previous operator Royal Dutch Shell. The Brent system is jointly owned by 21 companies.

== Oil transportation system ==
Oil is transported from 20 oilfields, including:

- Thistle
- Murchison
- Hutton
- North West Hutton
- Dunlin
- Brent A, B, C & D
- Cormorant Alpha
- North Cormorant
- Tern
- Eider

== Pipelines ==
The Cormorant A to Sullom Voe pipeline is 36 inches (910 mm) diameter steel (API 5L X60) of 147 kilometres (91 mi) in length. It has capacity of 100,000 barrels per day (16,000 m^{3}/d). The Brent C to Cormorant A pipeline is 30 inches (760 mm) in diameter and 35 kilometres (22 mi) long.

Other oil pipelines are:

Brent system oil pipelines
Pipeline number	From	To	Diameter (inches)	Length (km)
PL001	Brent C	Cormorant A	30	35.9
PL049	Brent A	Brent Spar	16	2.8
PL048	Brent B	Brent Spar	16	2.3
PL045	Brent B	Brent C	24	4.6
PL046	Brent D	Brent C	20	4.0
PL1955	Brent A	Brent B	14 (flexible)	

The specification for crude oil transported in the Brent system is as follows:

Crude oil specification
Parameter	Value
Entry point	Cormorant A
Exit point	Sullom Voe terminal
Crude oil	Non-sour
Base sediment and water	5%
True vapour pressure at entry	115 psia @ 100 °F
True vapour pressure at exit	220 psia @ 100 °F
Hydrogen sulfide	25 mg/l
Carbon dioxide	251 mg/l

== Production ==
Oil production (1000 barrels) from the Brent field from 1976 to 1983

== Decommissioning ==
Shell UK Limited propose to decommission the Brent Field pipelines in the mid-2020s.
