= FLAGS =

British sector of the North Sea natural gas pipeline

Far North Liquids and Associated Gas System

Location
- Country: United Kingdom
- Direction: north–south–west
- Start: Brent oilfield
- Passes through: North Sea
- To: St Fergus Gas Plant

General information
- Type: natural gas
- Partners: Royal Dutch Shell, ExxonMobil
- Operator: Shell UK Exploration and Production

Technical information
- Length: 450 km (280 mi)
- Diameter: 36 in (914 mm)

The FLAGS (Far North Liquids and Associated Gas System) pipeline is a natural gas pipeline in the UK sector of the North Sea which, together with its associated pipelines, is used to transport gas and associated liquids from oil and gas fields in the northern North Sea to the St. Fergus gas terminal.

== Pipelines ==
The FLAGS system gas pipelines are:

FLAGS system gas pipelines
| Pipeline number | From | To | Diameter (inches) | Length (km) | Notes |
|---|---|---|---|---|---|
| PL044 | Brent D | Brent C | 24 | 4.2 | |
| PL047 | Brent C | Brent B | 30 | 4.4 | |
| PL052 | Brent B | Brent A | 36 | 2.3 | |
| PL002 (FLAGS) | Brent A | St Fergus | 36 | 450 | FLAGS line |
| PL164 (NLGP) | Magnus | Brent A | 20 | 79 | NLGP |
| PL165 | Murchison | NLGP tie in | 6 | 3.2 | |
| PL166 | Thistle | NLGP tie in | 6 | 3.2 | |
| PL200 | Statfjord B | NLGP tie in | 6 | 3.2 | From Norway |
| PL017 (WLGP) | Cormorant A | Brent A | 16 | 40.5 | WLGP |
| PL917 | Ninian Central | WLGP tie in | 10 | 17.7 | |
| | North Cormorant | WLGP tie in | 10 | 22.5 | |
| | Tampen | FLAGS tie in | 32 | 23.2 | From Norway |
| PL3039 | Knarr | FLAGS tie in | 12 | 106 | From Norway |
| PL2633 | Gjoa | FLAGS tie in | 28 | 130 | From Norway |

== Installations ==
FLAGS provides the gas export route for the following installations.

- Cormorant A
- North Cormorant
- North West Hutton
- Ninian Central
- Ninian North & South
- Brent 'A', 'B', 'C' and 'D'
- Tern
- Magnus
- Thistle
- Murchison
- Statfjord
- Heather
- Gjøa
- Gas exported from West of Shetland oil fields (Foinaven, Schiehallion/Loyal and Clair)
- Knarr

== Infrastructure ==
The FLAGS pipeline is a 36-inch (910 mm) steel pipe to API 5L, X60 specification and is 450.6 kilometres (280.0 mi) long. It starts at Brent 'A' and terminates at St. Fergus near Peterhead in Scotland. Pipe laying was completed in April 1978 and finally commissioned in May 1982. The pipeline was laid by SEMAC 1.

At Brent A, the pipeline is connected with the Northern Leg and Western Leg transmission systems, carrying gas from a number of nearby fields.

The 20-inch Northern Leg Gas Pipeline (NLGP) runs for 80 km from Magnus to Brent A with spurs to Thistle A, Murchison and Statfjord B. It originally served as the gas export route for these installations and delivered gas to Brent A for onward transmission to St Fergus via FLAGS. As some of these installation have become gas deficient it has served as their gas supply route. The pipeline has depressurisation facilities at Magnus. Gas from the NLGP is heated before flowing via manual pressure let-down valves to the HP and LP flare systems. Pre-heating the gas ensures that it remains within the temperature limits of the flare pipework after

The 16-inch Western Leg Gas Pipeline (WLGP) transports gas from Cormorant A to Brent A. It also takes gas from Ninian Central and North Cormorant.

Natural gas from the Norwegian Statfjord field is fed through the Tampen pipeline, linking Norwegian and UK gas trunkline networks.

== Inlet specification ==
The inlet specification for gas transported in the FLAGS system is as follows:

FLAGS gas properties
| Parameter | Value |
|---|---|
| Carbon dioxide | 1.6 % vol max |
| Hydrogen sulfide | 2.5 ppmv max |
| Total sulfur | 15 ppmv max |
| Water | 35 ppmv max |
| Cricondenbar | 105 bara max |
| Oxygen | 10 ppm max |
| Mercury | 0.01 μg/m^{3} max |
| Propane + | 5.5 %mol min |

== Capacity and throughput ==
The FLAGS system has a capacity of 33 million standard m^{3}/ day.

Up to the end of 1991 the total cumulative throughput of FLAGS 49,757 million cubic metres of gas.

Throughput over the period 1992 to 2014 (in million cubic metres)
