= Dunlin (disambiguation) =

A dunlin is a wading bird.

Dunlin may also refer to:

- USS Dunlin, several ships in the U.S. Navy

== See also ==
- Dunlin oilfield, situated off the coast of Scotland
