= Günther Clauss =

German professor for Naval Architecture and Ocean Engineering (born 1939)

Günther F. Clauss (born December 31, 1939) is a German professor for Naval Architecture and Ocean Engineering.

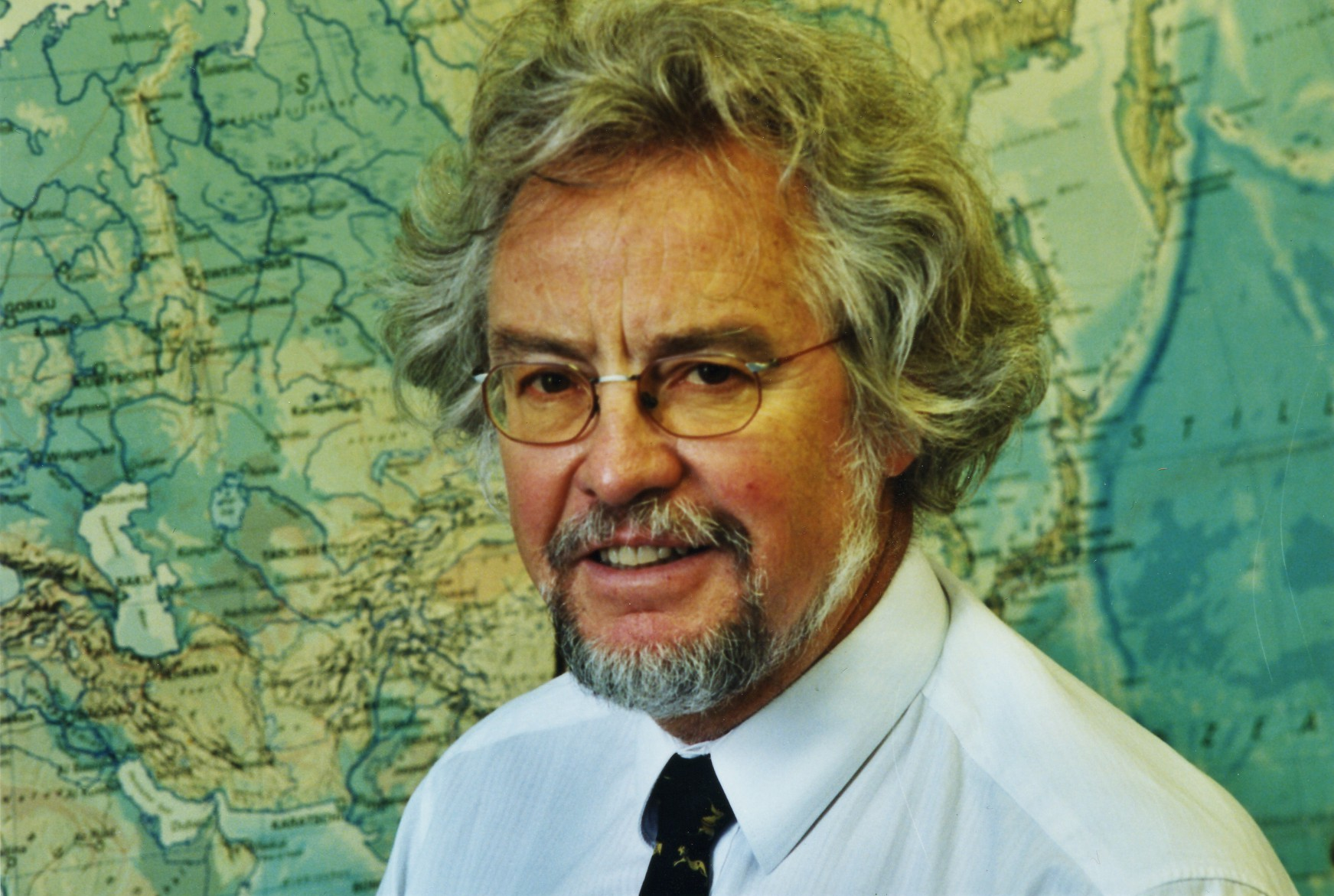
Prof.Dr.-Ing. G.F. Clauss

== Scientific career ==
Clauss studied technical physics at the Technical University of Munich and at Technische Universität Berlin, completing his doctorate at the Institute of Aerospace (TU Berlin) in 1968. Inspired by Professor Alfred Keil, Dean of Engineering at MIT he changed from outer space to inner space, and established the new field 'ocean engineering' at Technische Universität Berlin. After his habililtation – a postgraduate degree – he became professor of Ocean Engineering in 1972, and – after research visits at the MIT-Department of Ocean Engineering, the Institute of NAOE, University of California at Berkeley, and the Indian Institute of Technology, Madras – he was offered the first Chair of Ocean Engineering in Germany at the TU Berlin in 1973. For many years he served as a Director of the Institute of Naval Architecture and Ocean Engineering, three legislative periods he was the Dean of the Faculty of Mechanical Engineering and Transport Systems and 12 years Senator at the Academic Council.

== Research activities ==
The extensive research activities of Günther Clauss – focussing on the design and hydromechanics of offshore structures as well as on deep sea technology – cover projects on capsizing of ships, design and optimization of offshore platforms, pipelaying vessels and floating cranes as well as the development of oil skimming vessels, deepsea shuttles and ocean mining systems. For the deterministic analysis of cause-reaction chains he developed a seakeeping test procedure which uses tailored extreme waves – embedded in irregular seas – to investigate precisely wave/structure interactions. With his research assistants, colleagues and industry partners he published more than 400 papers ('best paper award' OMAE 2006) as well as the books 'Meerestechnische Konstruktionen' (also in Korean) and 'Offshore Structures' (Vol I - Conceptual Design and Hydromechanics, Vol II - Strength and Safety for Structural Design). Under his guidance more than 30 Ph.D. theses have been successfully completed - based on research projects of the European Union, the German Ministries BMBF (Research and Development) and BMWi (Economy and Technology), the German Science Foundation (DFG) and the Association of Industrial Partners (AIF). Günther Clauss served as chairman and member at ITTC and ISSC, is member of STG (executive board), RINA (F) and SNAME (M). In offshore platform decommissioning he served as a member in the IRG of Brent Spar and is currently engaged in the Scientific Review Group (SRG) for the Ekofisk Field (ConocoPhillips) as well as the Brent-Field (Shell).

== Awards ==
- 2005 K.E.R.N.-Maritime Technology Award
- 2006 SOBENA International Reward (for outstanding contributions to the naval architecture and ocean engineering).
- 2006/2007 he was awarded by the nomination for the Georg-Weinblum-Memorial Lecturer for outstanding research in the field of hydrodynamics
