= Tern oilfield =

UK oil field in the Shetland Basin

- Location within North Sea
- Country: Scotland, United Kingdom
- Region: Shetland basin
- Block: 210/25a
- Offshore/onshore: Offshore
- Coordinates: 61°20′0″N 0°50′0″E
- Operator: TAQA Bratani

Field history
- Discovery: 1975
- Start of development: 1985
- Start of production: 1989

Production
- Estimated oil in place: 175 million barrels (~2.39×10^{7} t)
- Estimated gas in place: 40×10^{9} cu ft (1.1×10^{9} m^{3})

Platform Name - Tern Alpha.

The Tern oilfield is an oilfield situated 169 kilometres (105 mi) north east of Lerwick, Shetland Islands, Scotland, in block numbers 210/25a.

== History ==
The Tern field was discovered in April 1975 by well 210/25-1, drilled by semi-submersible rig Sedco 135G in a water depth of 167 metres (548 ft). It started production in 1989. Until July 2008, the oilfield was operated by Royal Dutch Shell and licensed by Shell/Esso. On 7 July 2008, it was purchased by TAQA Bratani, a subsidiary of the Abu Dhabi National Energy Company, along with the Eider, North Cormorant, Cormorant Alpha, Kestrel and Pelican fields and related sub-sea satellite fields.

== Reserves and geology ==
Estimated recovery of Tern oilfield is 175 million barrels (27.8×10^{6} m^{3}) of oil. The oil has a gravity of 34°API.

Structurally, it is a triangular uplifted block of the Brent Group bounded by NNW-SSE and NNE-SSW trending faults and sealed by overlying Kimmeridge Clay (the dominant source rock, with debated contributions from the much deeper Old Red Sandstone) and Shetland Group mudstones.

== Tern oil platform ==
The Tern oil platform is a steel jacket production and drilling platform. It was built by RGC Offshore at Methil yard and was installed in May 1988. As well as processing the fluids from the Tern reservoir, the platform also processes fluids from the Hudson, Falcon and Kestrel fields. Once processed, the oil is co-mingled and exported to Sullom Voe Terminal via the North Cormorant and Cormorant Alpha platforms by the Brent System pipeline.

Well fluids from the Tern wellheads are routed to two parallel separation trains, Train A and Train B. Train A comprises a 3-phase (oil, gas and produced water) Production Separator. Separated oil is routed to a 2-phase (oil and produced water) Train A Dehydrator where further produced water is removed. Oil from the Dehydrator is cooled and pumped via a metering skid to the export pipeline. Train B comprises a 3-phase Production Separator from which oil is cooled, pumped and mixed with Train A oil prior to metering. Well fluids from the Hudson field are routed to the 3-phase Hudson Production Separator. Separated oil can be routed through the 2-phase Hudson Dehydrator and thence to coolers and segregated metering prior to mixing with the Train A and B oil prior to export. Produced water from the Production Separators and Dehydrators is treated before disposal overboard. Gas from the Separators is co-mingled and compressed in three stages of compression. Fuel gas is taken from the discharge of the second stage of compression. Compressed gas is used for gas-lifting both the Tern and Hudson oil production wells. Gas is treated in a treatment packing prior to metering and export by pipeline.

The Hudson Field which is located in 210/24, started producing over the platform in 1993. The peak production was 4.70 million tonnes per year. The Tern platform later added the Kestrel Field, located in 211/21a, this small subsea tieback started production in 2001.

The latest addition to the Tern was Cladhan which started producing in 2017.

== See also ==
- Energy policy of the United Kingdom
- Energy use and conservation in the United Kingdom
