= Brent oilfield =

Former oilfield in the North Sea

Brent Oil Field
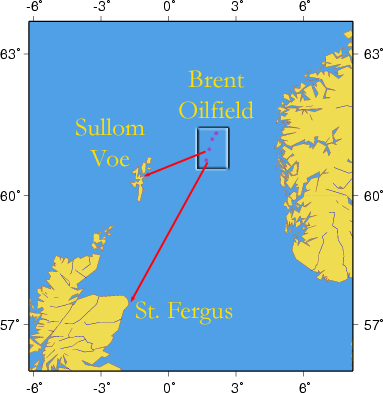
- Country: UK
- Region: North Sea
- Location: East Shetland Basin
- Block: 211/29
- Offshore/onshore: Offshore
- Coordinates: 60°54′N 1°48′E
- Operator: Shell UK Limited
- Partners: Royal Dutch Shell, ExxonMobil

Field history
- Discovery: 1971
- Start of production: 1976
- Peak year: 1982

Production
- Producing formations: Brent Group

The Brent oilfield was a petroleum installation located in 140 metres (470 ft) of water, in the East Shetland Basin of the North Sea, 186 kilometres (116 mi) north-east of Lerwick in the Shetland Islands, Scotland. The Brent oilfield was discovered in 1971 with the 211/29-1 exploration well which was drilled by the Shell owned 'Staflo' semi-submersible drilling rig. At the time, this was the world's most northerly well ever drilled. Appraisal of the discovery was not possible until 1972 due to the severe winter weather conditions of the Northern North Sea and the limited capabilities of contemporary drilling rigs. A total of 6 appraisal wells were drilled to allow the full potential of the field to be evaluated. The original oil/condensate-in-place and wet gas-in-place were estimated at 3.8 billion barrels (600 million cubic metres) and 7.5 trillion cubic feet (210 billion cubic metres) respectively.

The field was developed with 4 large fixed platforms: Alpha, Bravo, Charlie, Delta, which were installed between 1975 and 1978. First oil was achieved in 1976. A total initial investment of £3 billion was required to develop the field, install the infrastructure, drill the wells and bring the oil and gas to shore.

Brent was once one of the most productive parts of the UK's offshore assets but has now been fully decommissioned after reaching the end of its economic life. All four platforms were removed from the field between 2017 and 2024 by Pioneering Spirit, the world's largest vessel by tonnage.

== Name ==
Shell initially named all of its UK oil fields after seabirds in alphabetical order by discovery – Auk, Brent, Cormorant, Dunlin, Eider, Fulmar and so on. Brent refers to the brent goose, and in turn gave its initials to the geologic subdivisions of the Middle Jurassic-age Brent Group that make up the field: Broom, Rannoch, Etive, Ness and Tarbert formations, with each name representing a loch in the Scottish Highlands.

== Geology ==
Situated in the East Shetland Basin, the Brent is the archetype for many of the fields in the area, consisting of a tilted fault block exposing the eponymous Brent formation, next to bounding faults which allowed migration from deeper adjacent "kitchen" areas where the Kimmeridge Clay Formation becomes fully mature and releases hydrocarbons. Unusually on a worldwide scale (but common in this basin), the seal or cap rock for the reservoir (which stops the hydrocarbons from migrating further towards the surface) is also the Kimmeridge Clay, or technically the Heather Formation immediately below.

The reservoir depth is 2,651 metres (8,698 ft).

== Production ==
Production started on 11 November 1976, and on 13 December 1976 the first tanker was loaded. The Brent field oil was extracted by four platforms in an irregular SSW-NNE line. The first in place was the concrete-legged "Condeep" Brent Bravo, built by Norwegian Contractors in Stavanger, in August 1975. This was followed by the steel-jacket Brent Alpha built by Redpath Dorman Long in Methil and installed in May 1976; the concrete-legged Brent Delta, again built by Norwegian Contractors in Stavanger, in July 1976; and the concrete-base Brent Charlie, built by McAlpine/Sea Tank in Ardyne Point, installed in June 1978. As of 2004, the field was still producing oil through a manifold (all Brent Alpha fluids are produced across to Brent Bravo). A fifth installation, the floating Brent Spar, served as a storage- and tanker-loading buoy and was installed early in the field's construction. The "spar" design of this installation led to the name by which it became the best known of the Brent installations (outside the oil industry). The field also included a remote flare, the "Brent Flare", which was used to flare off excess gas before gas handling and export facilities were installed in the field, also used as a vent in winter 1995–96. This unit was decommissioned and removed using a heavy lifting barge in 2005.

The topsides for Brent Charlie were designed by Matthew Hall Engineering which was awarded the contract in January 1974. Initially there were facilities for 19 oil production wells, nine water injection wells, six gas injection wells and three spare slots. The production capacity was 150,000 barrels (24,000 m^{3}) per day and 8.5 million standard cubic metres of gas per day. There were three production trains each with four stages of separation with the first stage separators operating at a pressure of 9.6 bar. The 14 subsea storage cells had a capacity of 400,000 barrels (64,000 m^{3}). Electricity generation was powered by three 12 MW Rolls-Royce Avon gas turbines. The topside accommodation was for 120 people. There were 14 topsides modules and the topsides weight was 34,000 tonnes (33,000 long tons; 37,000 short tons).

The initial design parameters of the Brent installations is summarised in the table.

Installation	Brent A	Brent B	Brent C	Brent D	Brent Spar	Flare tower
Coordinates	61°02’06”N 01°42’19”E	61°03’21”N 01°42’47”E	61°05’46”N 01°43’18”E	61°07’57”N 01°44’10”E	61°03’15”N 01°40’04”E	61°02’46”N 01°45’26”E
Water depth, metres	140	139	141	142	140	140
Fabrication	RDL Methil	Condeep Group, Stavanger	Dordrecht Netherlands	Condeep Group, Stavanger	Rotterdam	Dunkirk
Topsides weight, tonnes	14,762	23,194	21,330	22,433	60,000 (displacement)	1,250
Function	Drilling, production accommodation	Drilling, production, storage accommodation	Drilling, production, storage accommodation	Drilling, production, storage accommodation	Crude loading	Remote gas flare
Accommodation	133	171	200	186	30	–
Type	Steel jacket	Concrete gravity	Concrete gravity	Concrete gravity	Spar	Moored lattice
Legs	6	3	4	3	–	1
Well slots	28	38	40	48	–	–
Throughput oil, bpd	100,000	150,000	150,000	150,000	100,000 spar, 250,000 from platforms	–
Throughput gas, MMSCFD	200	320	350	350	–	54
Oil storage capacity, barrels	Nil	1,100,000	600,000	1,100,000	300,000	–
Installed	May 1976	August 1975	June 1978	July 1976	June 1976	August 1975
Production start	June 1978	November 1976	June 1981	November 1977	December 1976	1976
Oil production to	Spar 209 km 16-inch	Spar 2.4 km 6-inch Brent C 4.6 km 24-inch	Cormorant 33.6 km 30-inch	Brent C 4.2 km 20-inch	Tanker	–
Gas production to	St Fergus 448 km 36-inch pipeline	Brent A 2.4 km 36-inch	Brent B 4.5 km 30-inch	Brent C 4.6 km 24-inch	–	–

The field supplied oil via the Brent System pipeline to the terminal at Sullom Voe, while gas piped through the FLAGS pipeline ashore at St Fergus on the north-east coast of Scotland.

Production of oil from the field (in 1000s barrels)

The field underwent a £1.3 billion upgrade project in the mid-1990s, which involved depressurising the entire reservoir and making extensive modifications to three of the four Brent platforms. This converted them to low-pressure operation, which unlocked significant quantities of natural gas from the reservoir and extended the field life beyond 2010.

The field's peak production capacity reached 504,000 barrels (80,100 m^{3}) of oil per day (bopd) in 1982 and it produced a total of approximately three billion barrels of oil equivalent (18 billion gigajoules) as of 2008.

The Brent field decommissioning project was initiated in 2006. Brent Delta was the first platform to cease production in December 2011, while the Brent Alpha and Bravo platforms stopped production in November 2014, Brent Charlie in March 2021.

== Decommission ==
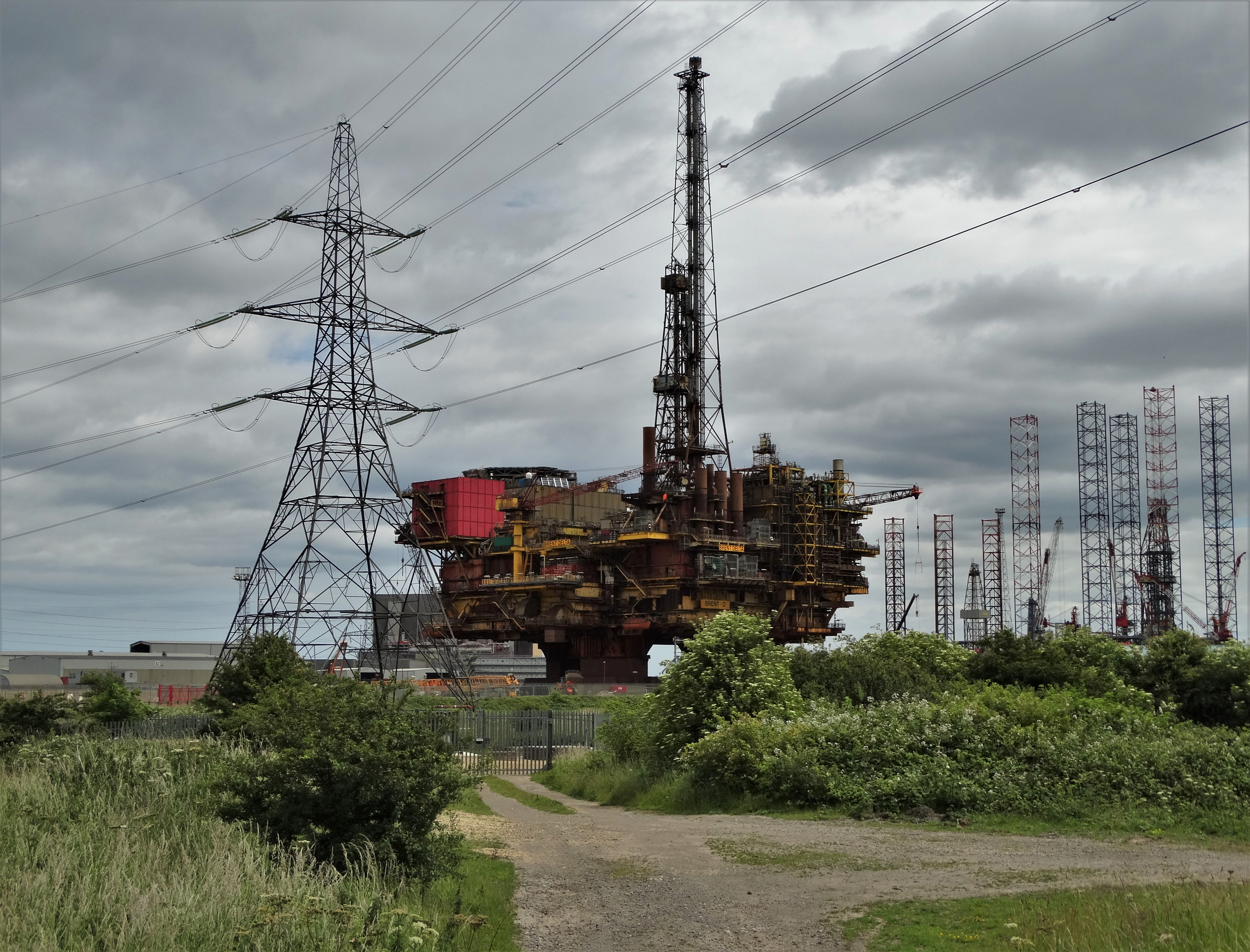
The decommissioned Brent Delta topside in Hartlepool

The Brent pipelines decommissioning programme was approved by the UK government in March 2020. As per the decommissioning plan, the gravity-based structures (GBS) of Delta, Charlie, and Bravo platforms, the jacket footings of Alpha platform, drill cuttings, and the GBS cell contents will not be removed from the field. The GBS subsea storage cells were used to temporarily store crude oil before pumping to tankers or pipeline.

The Brent field is being decommissioned in a phased manner. The Brent Delta topside decommissioning programme was approved by the UK government in July 2015, while that for the Alpha, Bravo, and the Charlie platforms were approved in August 2018. The topsides of the Brent Delta platform, weighing approximately 24,200 tonnes (23,800 long tons; 26,700 short tons), was removed in a single-lift in April 2017 and transported to Hartlepool for recycling. The topside was completely dismantled by February 2019.

The topsides of the Brent Bravo platform, weighing approximately 25,000 tonnes (25,000 long tons; 28,000 short tons), was removed in a single-lift in June 2019. The topside is currently being dismantled and recycled.

The legs of the Brent Bravo and Delta platforms remain in place with their GBS subsea storage cells. This will also apply to the Brent Charlie platform when decommissioned. The contents of the GBS storage cells are likely to be residual hydrocarbons and radioactive toxic elements.

== Air incidents involving workers ==
On 31 July 1979, a Dan Air fixed wing aircraft crashed attempting to take off from Sumburgh Airport. The flight was returning Brent Field workers to Aberdeen. There were 17 fatalities. The aircraft was an ex Aerolineas Argentinas HS 748 manufactured in 1962. The main cause was found to be a faulty gust lock. The co-pilot was found to have tranquillisers in his system. It is not known if he was in control as he had less than 100 hours on this type of aircraft.

On 6 November 1986, a Boeing Vertol BV234 Chinook helicopter G-BWFC crashed on approach to Sumburgh airport. The flight was returning from the Brent Field. There were 45 fatalities and 2 survivors one of whom was the pilot. The cause was found to be faulty transmission, which caused the twin rotor blades to collide.

On 25 July 1990, a Sikorsky S61-N helicopter G-BEWL crashed while attempting to land on Brent Spar. There were 6 fatalities including both pilots. The cause was found to be pilot error and design of the helideck.

== See also ==
- Brent crude
- Energy policy of the United Kingdom
- Energy use and conservation in the United Kingdom
- List of oil fields
