= Murchison oilfield =

Norwegian oil field in the North Sea

Coordinates: 61°23′55″N 1°44′42″E

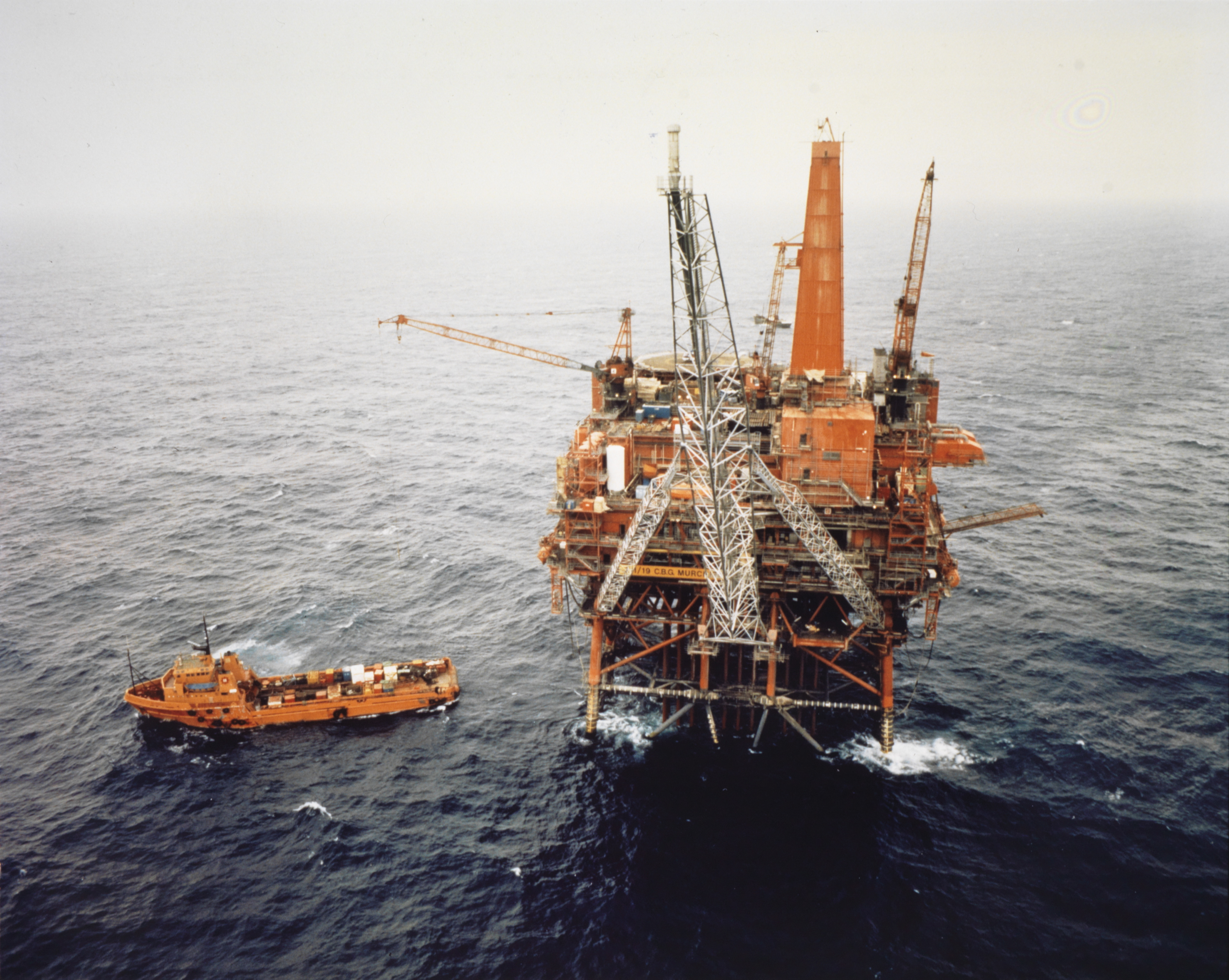
Conocos Murchison platform

The Murchison oil field is located in the northern North Sea in the East Shetland Basin on the UK Continental Shelf. The field is situated 150 km north-east of Shetland and straddles the UK/Norwegian median line. It lies in UK Block 211/19 and extends into Norwegian Block 33/9. The field is named after the Scottish geologist Sir Roderick Impey Murchison (1792–1871). Recoverable reserves were estimated to be 340 million barrels of oil out of a total oil-in-place of 790 million barrels. The field was developed through a large steel jacket platform standing in 156 m of water. The peak production rate was 150,383 barrels of oil per day in December 1982. Oil production was supported by gas and water injection. Production ceased in 2014 and the platform was removed in 2017.

== History ==
The Murchison oil field was discovered in 1975 by Conoco (UK) Ltd. The reservoir is a Middle Jurassic Brent Group sandstone sealed by Upper Jurassic shales. The oil is unsaturated and had a gravity of 36° API, and without a gas cap. The topsides for Murchison were designed by Matthew Hall Engineering which was awarded the contract in November 1976. Construction was by McDermott Scotland at their Ardersier yard. Initially there were facilities for ten oil production wells, ten water injection wells, two gas injection wells and five spare slots. The production capacity was 164,000 barrels of oil per day and 1.3 million standard cubic metres of gas per day. There was a single production train with three stages of 3-phase of oil, gas and water separation; the first stage separator initially operated at 45 barg. Electricity generation was powered by two 19 MW Rolls-Royce Olympus C gas turbines. The topside accommodation was for 200 people. The topsides weighed 16,000 tonnes and there were 16 modules supported by an eight leg steel jacket of lift weight 24,640 tonnes.

The British and Norwegian government licensees entered into an agreement in 1979 concerning common exploitation of the resources on the Murchison field.

== Operation ==
The platform was installed in 1979 and after one year of hook-up and commissioning production started in September 1980. Oil was exported through a 16-inch pipeline via the Dunlin platform and then the Cormorant Alpha platform to Sullom Voe. Gas was reinjected into the reservoir and excess was exported via a 6-inch spur line to the Northern Leg Gas Pipeline (NLGP) to Brent Alpha then via the FLAGS pipeline to St Fergus. Peak production occurred in 1984 at a rate of 3.1 million cubic metres of oil equivalent. In later field life fuel gas was imported from the NLGP. The Playfair field to the north of Murchison was developed in 2004 and produced through an extended reach well. In January 1995 Conoco relinquished ownership and Oryx U.K. Energy Co. was appointed as operator of the Murchison, Hutton and Lyell fields. Oryx stated this was ‘the chance to add value to the fields by extending the Murchison and Hutton field lives by at least 5 years, and by adopting a new style of working’. In October 1998 Kerr-McGee acquired Oryx and became the operator of Murchison. Canadian Natural Resources (CNR) acquired the Murchison field and installation from Kerr-McGee in 2002, and CNR remained the operator through to platform decommissioning. The total oil produced during the life of the field was 400 million barrels.

== Decommissioning ==
CNR submitted a Cessation of Production application which was approved by the UK government in 2012. Production ceased in 2014. Decommissioning activities started from 2013 by plugging the wells. The platform was dismantled by removing the topsides modules and then removing the jacket to a height of about 44 m above the sea bed. Drill cuttings and pipelines were left in situ. The upper jacket was removed in June 2017 completing the decommissioning process.

== See also ==
- Energy policy of the United Kingdom
- Energy use and conservation in the United Kingdom
