= Eider oilfield =

Scottish oilfield

- Location within North Sea
- Country: Scotland, United Kingdom
- Region: East Shetland Basin
- Block: 211/16a 211/21a
- Offshore/onshore: Offshore
- Coordinates: 61°22′N 1°10′E
- Operator: TAQA

Field history
- Discovery: 1976

Production
- Recoverable oil: 85 million barrels (~1.2×10^{7} t)

The Eider Oilfield is situated 184 kilometres (114 mi) north east of Lerwick, Shetland Islands, Scotland, in block numbers 211/16a and 211/21a. It is operated by Abu Dhabi National Energy Company (TAQA). It was discovered in May 1976 in a water depth of 157.5 metres (517 ft). Estimated recovery is 85 million barrels (13,500,000 m^{3}) of oil.

The production is via the North Cormorant platform to the Brent System pipeline.

Production ceased in January 2018, at which point the platform was converted to a utility for the Otter oil field providing power, chemical and system support.

== Topsides facilities ==
The topsides for Eider were designed by Matthew Hall Engineering which was awarded the contract in October 1984. Initially there were facilities for 7 oil production wells, 7 water injection wells and ten spare slots. The production capacity was 53,000 barrels of oil per day. There was a single production train with a single separator operating at a pressure of 13–28 barg. Crude oil from the separator was treated in a crude oil coalescer to remove produced water prior to export. Well fluids from the Otter field were initially separated in the Otter Separator with liquids passed to the Eider Production Separator. Gas from the Otter and Eider separators was used as fuel gas and purge gas and the excess was flared. Electricity generating capacity was by three 3 MW generators with a bidirectional subsea cable to North Cormorant. The topside accommodation was for 76 people. The integrated deck had a weight of 5,000 tonnes. The platform was fabricated by Highlands Fabricators at Nigg Bay and was installed in May 1988.
