= Dunlin oilfield =

Oil field in the United Kingdom

Dunlin oil field
- Location within North Sea
- Country: United Kingdom
- Region: northern North Sea
- Location/blocks: 211/23a 211/24a
- Offshore/onshore: Offshore
- Coordinates: 61°16′30″N 1°35′51″E
- Operators: see text
- Owner: see text

Field history
- Discovery: 1973
- Start of production: 1978

Production
- Producing formations: Middle Jurassic

The Dunlin oilfield is situated 195 km northeast of Lerwick, Shetland, Scotland, in block number 211/23a and 211/24a. It was originally operated by Shell but was sold in 2008 and is now operated by Fairfield Energy and partners MCX.

Under Fairfield initially the platform was operated using the duty holder model. Amec (now Worley) were the duty holder contractor and Aker Solutions was the engineering and upgrade project contract. Fairfield became the duty holder in April 2014.

The Field was originally discovered in July 1973 in a water depth of 151 metres (495 ft) approximately 12 km from the UK-Norway median line. Estimated recovery is 363 million barrels of oil. The oil reservoir is located at a depth of 9,000 feet (2,740 metres).

Dunlin acts as the host platform for production from the Osprey and Merlin subsea fields.

== The field ==
The reservoir comprises a middle Jurassic sandstone at a depth of 8,700 to 9,700 feet (2,652 to 2,957 m). The reservoir and its fluids had the following characteristics:

Dunlin reservoir fluids
Parameter	Value
Porosity	24 %
Permeability	100-1,500 md
API gravity	36°API
Gas Oil Ratio	250 standard cubic feet/barrel
Sulfur content	0.4 %
Recoverable reserves	310 million barrels, 52.2 million tonnes

== Production ==
The field was developed by a single integrated drilling, production, storage and accommodation platform. The principal design data of the Dunlin platform was as follows:

Dunlin platform design data
Coordinates	61°16’30”N 01°35’51”E
Water depth, metres	151
Fabrication substructure	Maasvlakte Netherlands
Topsides design	Ewbank & Partners / Halcrow Offshore
Topside weight, tonnes	17,450
Function	Drilling, production, storage, accommodation
Accommodation (crew)	183
Type	Concrete gravity
Legs	4
Cells	81
Storage capacity, barrels	800,000
Well slots	48
Throughput oil, barrels per day (bpd)	150,000
Water injection, bpd	111,250
Platform installed	June 1977
Production start	August 1978
Water injection start	May 1979
Oil production to	Cormorant A 35 km 24-inch pipeline
Gas production to	Used on board as fuel gas

Production started in August 1978 from the Dunlin Alpha platform. This platform is a concrete gravity base (GBS) structure of the ANDOC type (Anglo Dutch Offshore Concrete) and was installed in June 1977. It has four legs and storage capacity for 838,200 barrels of oil. The total sub-structure weight is 225,000 long tons (229,000 tonnes) and it is designed to carry a topsides weight of 15,635 long tons (15,886 tonnes). The storage system was decommissioned by Shell from 2005 to 2007 prior to the sale to Fairfield Energy.

The topsides facilities included capability to drill, produce, meter and export oil. It also has capability to re-inject water to maintain reservoir pressure, (111,250 bls/day) predicted. Peak production was 115,000 barrels per day in 1979; and it was approximately in the region of 3500 - 4000 bpd in 2015 prior to the shut in announcement (Production ceased on 15 June 2015) Oil production is by pipeline to Cormorant Alpha and then by Brent System pipeline to Sullom Voe, Shetland. Associated gas powers electrical generation. Some gas was flared.

Oil production profile for Dunlin (in 1000s barrels per year) in the early operating period

== Subsea Satellite Fields ==
Osprey was developed by Shell in 1989/90 and employs two drill centres, one for production (with 8 subsea trees) and one for water injection (with 4 subsea trees). The drill centres are connected to the platform via two back to back flowline bundles containing 2 off 8" production flowlines and a 10" water injection line. Subsea trees and the manifolds were supplied by Cameron Oil Tools (now OneSubsea). Subsea control system was supplied by Kvaerner FSSL (now Aker solutions).

The Merlin field was discovered in 1998 and was initially developed as a low cost CRINE field (Cost Reduction In the New Era) utilising the discovery well recompleted as a subsea producer. The Merlin drill centre was progressively expanded to 3 subsea production wells and a single water injector. The flowlines from Merlin comprise 8" water injection and production lines. These tie into the Osprey riser system at Dunlin. Merlin subsea controls tie in via a crossover manifold adjacent to Dunlin into the Osprey umbilical system. Flexible flowlines were installed for water injection service on Merlin and Osprey in 2002.

Osprey and Merlin produce from the same Brent sequence geology as the main Dunlin Field.

== Pipeline Infrastructure ==
Fairfield installed a 4" fuel gas import line from the Thistle platform in 2012 to provide fuel for the platform power generation plant. The field had become gas deficient (insufficient associated gas being produced as a by product of oil production) under Shell. In an attempt to mitigate this Shell had installed a 33KVa power import cable between Dunlin and Brent C in 2002. The Brent sequence fields rely on water injection to maintain production and Dunlin had an installed water injection plant capable of delivering 250,000 bwpd supplied by 5 electrically powered water injection pumps.

Dunlin acts as a pipeline node on the Brent system and provides connection point for the 16" export line from the Enquest operated Thistle and Don Fields and the 16" line from the Murchison field (the latter in the process of being decommissioned by Canadian Natural Resources International - CNRI - June 2015)

== Decommissioning ==
In May 2015, Fairfield Energy announced plans to decommission its Dunlin Alpha platform in the North Sea. The decommissioning process, which requires regulatory approvals, is expected to cost about £400 million. Dunlin has been cited as an example of the impact a decommissioning decision has impacting surrounding infrastructure as per the 2014 Wood MER (Maximising Economic Recovery) Report - the "Domino Effect". Enquest will have to provide a pipeline "bypass" to allow continued export from the Thistle complex of fields to be exported via the 16" export line into the 24" line that runs from Dunlin to Cormorant Alpha.

The decommissioning of the Murchison field and the Dunlin complex removes two "shippers" from the Brent system resulting in increase pipeline operating costs for the remaining users.
