= Ardyne Point =

Headland in Argyll and Bute, Scotland

- Headland
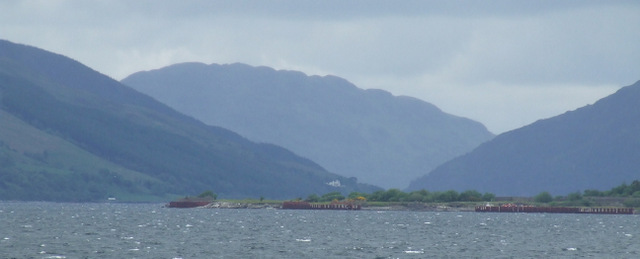

- Location within Scotland
- Coordinates: 55.871108°N 5.044463°W
- Grid position: NS095684
- Location: Cowal, Argyll and Bute, Scotland

Ardyne Point is a headland on the Cowal peninsula in Argyll and Bute, Scotland. It lies to the south of the town of Dunoon and to the west of the village of Toward.

Offshore of the point, the waters of the Kyles of Bute, to the west, and Loch Striven, to the north, meet the Firth of Clyde, to the south and east. The point faces across this meet towards Strone Point, on the far side of Loch Striven, and the Isle of Bute.

An oil rig construction yard operated at Ardyne Point from 1974 to 1978. Run by Sir Robert McAlpine, it constructed three concrete gravity platforms for use in the North Sea. The largest of these was the Cormorant Alpha platform for the Cormorant oilfield situated some 100 miles (160 km) north-east of Shetland, where it is still in use.

Since the 1960s, the Loch Striven Oil Fuel Depot has operated at Knockdow, some 2 miles (3.2 km) north of Ardyne Point. Operated by the Oil and Pipelines Agency, it receives diesel and aviation fuel by coastal tanker, and provides supplies to Royal Navy and other NATO vessels.
