= Heather Formation =

Geologic formation in the North Sea

- Stratigraphic range: Bathonian–Oxfordian
- Type: Formation
- Underlies: Kimmeridge Clay Formation
- Overlies: Pentland Formation, Brent Group
- Thickness: up to 700 m (Central North Sea)

Lithology
- Primary: Claystone
- Other: Siltstone

Location
- Region: North Sea
- Country: Norway, United Kingdom

The Heather Formation is a geological formation occurs in the North Sea, offshore the United Kingdom and Norway. It preserves fossils from the Bathonian to Oxfordian stages of the Middle to Late Jurassic period and was deposited in an open marine depositional environment.

== See also ==
- List of fossiliferous stratigraphic units in Norway
