= Brent Group =

Geologic group in the North Sea

- Stratigraphic range: Aalenian–Bathonian
- Type: Group (stratigraphy)
- Sub-units: Broom Formation, Rannoch Formation, Etive Formation, Ness Formation and Tarbet Formation
- Underlies: Heather Formation
- Overlies: Drake Formation
- Area: East Shetland Basin, Viking Graben
- Thickness: Up to 300 m (980 ft)

Lithology
- Primary: Sandstone
- Other: Mudstone, Coal

Location
- Region: North Sea

Type section
- Named for: Brent oil field

The Brent Group is a stratigraphic group of Middle Jurassic age. It is an important hydrocarbon reservoir in the Northern North Sea. It is named for the Brent oil field, where it forms one of the reservoir units. It is subdivided into five formations, in order of age, the Broom, Rannoch, Etive, Ness and Tarbet Formations whose first letters spell out the name of the group.
