= Northern North Sea basin =

Map of the North Sea

The North Sea is part of the Atlantic Ocean in northern Europe. It is located between Norway and Denmark in the east, Scotland and England in the west, Germany, the Netherlands, Belgium and France in the south.

The geology of the North Sea describes the geological features such as channels, trenches, and ridges today and the geological history, plate tectonics, geological events that created them.

A geological basin is a large low-lying area or depression. It is often below sea level. Depressions are typically formed by tectonic processes acting on the lithosphere, providing "accommodation space" for sediment to be preserved. Basins are formed in a variety of tectonic settings: extensional, compressional, strike-slip and intraplate.

Geological basins are one of the most common places which collect sediment. The type of rocks which form there tell about the palaeoclimate of the continent. The geology is of interest to oil prospectors, hydrologists and palaeontologists. Exploration in the North Sea was initiated in May 1964 when the first well was spudded and the area has now become one of the most prolific hydrocarbon provinces in the world. Total recoverable reserves found to date, including adjacent land areas, amount to over 100 billion barrels of oil and natural gas.

Geologically speaking, the North Sea is divided into four main basins: Northern, Moray Firth, Central, and Southern. Each has a long and complex geologic history with unique structural and stratigraphic developments driven by tectonic events over the last 400 Million years. The northern North Sea Paleorift system, including the Viking and Sogn graben, is an approximately 150–200 km wide zone of extended upper crust with preserved strata from pre-Triassic to Tertiary. It is bounded by the Shetland Platform to the west and the Norwegian mainland to the east.

== Evolutionary outline ==
The most important events in the geological evolution of the North Sea are outlined as:

1. Precambrian events - formation of Highlands and basement elements.
2. The Caledonian plate cycle - Late Cambrian to Late Silurian Athollian and Caledonian Orogenies.
3. The Variscan plate cycle - Devono-Carboniferous rifting, Variscan Orogency, and creation of the Pangaea supercontinent.
4. Permo-Triassic rifting and thermal subsidence - Late Permian subsidence of the Moray Firth and east-west trending of the Permian Basin. Subsequent Triassic to early Jurassic thermal subsidence was abruptly terminated by a phase of Middle Jurassic thermal doming.
5. Middle Jurassic domal uplift - development of transient mantle plume head leading to erosion of central North Sea, volcanism, and subsequent rift system.
6. Late Jurassic to earliest Cretaceous extensional tectonics - led to fault-block rotations and formation of major structural traps within and adjacent to the Viking and Central Grabens. In contrast to areas west of Shetland, the phase of extensional basin development was followed by a phase of post-rift thermal subsidence in the North Sea during the later Cretaceous and Cenozoic.
7. Development of the Iceland hot spot and North Atlantic rifting - during the Cretaceous, the onset of sea-floor spreading in the North Atlantic Ocean superseded North Sea tectonics. Opening of the Atlantic Ocean and the development of the Iceland hot spot were major factors in Cenozoic uplift and exhumation of the British Isles. This caused regional tilt, affecting the western rift arm of the North Sea and Inner Moray Firth.
8. Tectonic Inversion of Mesozoic basin - creation of the Atlantic Ocean caused intraplate compression, leading to the tectonic inversion of former sedimentary basins across north-west Europe during the Late Cretaceous and Tertiary.

In general, pre-Triassic stratigraphy and rifting has been confirmed below the northern North Sea but is poorly known and little conclusive information exists about Devonian and Carboniferous extensional events. While precise dating and the spatial extent of the active stretching are uncertain, recent stratigraphic syntheses suggest syn-rift dates of no younger than Scythian, with a possible initiation during the late or even early Permian. The following middle Triassic to early Jurassic post-rift stage is considerable better known. Subsidence (approximately nine intervals) in the northern North Sea was accompanied by faulting, stepping down from both margins towards the present Viking Graben axis. Depositional environments pass from continental to marine, implying that the creation of new accommodation space outpaced sediment supply. It is likely that this was at least partly in response to thermal subsidence. The late Jurassic-early Cretaceous stretching event is also well constrained. Rotational movements on major fault zones bounding the northern Viking Graben commenced in the latest Bajocian-earliest Bathonian and ceased in the earliest Ryazanian. The depositional environments pass from coastal plain and shallow marine on the platforms and terraces bordering the Viking graben to deeper marine in the interior of the graben system. The Cretaceous-early Cenozoic succession in the northern North Sea largely represents post-rift infill, resulting from subsidence in response to lithospheric cooling following the late Jurassic-early Cretaceous stretching event. Subsequent Tertiary subsidence was segmented and interrupted by basin flank uplifts, whereas in the early Miocene the entire northernmost North Sea area became uplifted and eroded as a result of compressional tectonics in the Norwegian Sea.

== Tectonostratigraphic model ==
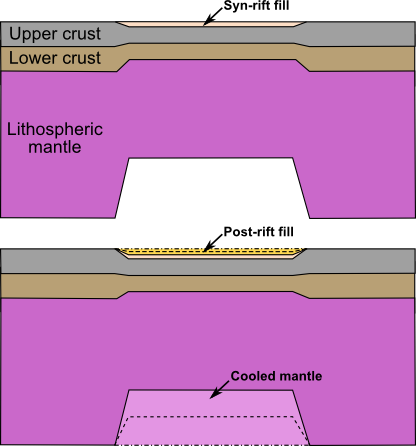
McKenzie model (pure shear)

In the northern North Sea, despite the substantial amount of data available, our understanding of the lithospheric processes governing extension are strongly model-based. The architecture and signature of the sediment infill in the northern North Sea can be discussed in the context of three distinct evolutionary stages of rift basin development separated by key geologic unconformities. The proto-rift stage describes the rift onset with either doming or flexural subsidence. Tabular architectures thickening across relatively steep faults, characterize the proto-rift stage. Active stretching and rotation of fault blocks then occurs during the main rift stage is then terminated by the development of the syn-rift unconformity. Syn-rift architectures can be highly variable depending on the ability of the available sediment supply to fill accommodation formed by rotation and subsidence during this stage. Where crustal separation is accomplished, a break-up unconformity commonly marks the boundary to the overlying thermal relaxation of post-rift stage. During the post-rift stage, an early phase with coarse clastic infilling of remnant rift topography often precedes late stage widening of the basin and filling with fine-grained sediments. These processes have been attributed to pure shear (crustal extension and faulting in the upper crust) and simple shear (ductile stretching in the lower crust) and coupled simple shear/pure shear flexural deformation. The combined thermal and elastic/isostatic response of the lithosphere to extension controls the crustal architecture and thereby the geometry of sedimentary basins, including those of the northern North Sea.

=== Proto-rift stage ===
The proto-rift stage is sometimes characterized by deposition in a wide, slowly subsiding flexural basin with only minor fault activity. During this stage, sedimentation is controlled primarily by climatic and, in marine settings, by relative sea-level fluctuations. In other rifts, progressive, thermally induced, upward displacement of the asthenosphere - lithosphere boundary by mantle plumes cause the gradual upward motion of broad rift domes that reach their maximum dimensions before or at the onset of active stretching. Proto-rift basins are typically saucer-shaped, slightly deepening towards the future graben axis, which can lead to large axial sediment transport systems. Domal uplift can occur contemporaneously with incipient subsidence in different segments of a proto-rift structure.

The evolution of the Brent Delta System of the northern North Sea follows this model. Deposition of the Brent Group has been coupled with the growth and erosion of a mid-North Sea dome, as well as with non-dome related tectonics along the northern North Sea rift margins. As domal uplift related to incipient rifting is commonly associated with subsidence in its vicinity, erosional products tend to accumulate in associated depositional basins that may be a proto-rift, as with the Brent Delta system. A proto rift unconformity also develops in this situation as seen in the southern and central parts of the palaeorift system where domal structures were deeply eroded in the middle Jurassic which is known as the 'Mid-Cimmerian' unconformity.

=== Main rift stage ===
The main rift or "syn-rift" stage describes the phase of active stretching and fault block rotation. Syn-rift subsidence results from the elastic/isostatic adjustment of the crust due to mechanical stretching of the lithosphere. The subsidence is counteracted by upwelling of the asthenosphere into the space created by the mechanical stretching and thermal upward displacement of the asthenosphere-lithosphere boundary, causing uplift of the rift zone. The fundamental architectural element in many extensional basins is the half-graben, formed within the hanging walls of major rift-bounding or intra-rift basin faults. The location and number of half grabens are influenced by the position of the main faults and the width of the rift zone, which depends on the rheology, crustal thickness and stretching factors.

Half-graben and wedge-shaped infill geometries characterize both the Permo-Triassic and late Jurassic stretching events in the northern North Sea, most prominently in the area southwest of the Brent Field. This area shows a high degree of three-dimensional variability with an intermixing of proto-rift and post-rift geometries. More evidence of progressive rift climax with divergent stratal patterns occurs across the major eastern boundary fault of the East Shetland Platform. Another example from the Permo-Triassic succession on the Horda Platform shows fault-bounded, wedge-shaped units from this time period. The amount of divergence suggests maximum tilt rates and rift climax during deposition of the Permian to early Triassic unit. A late-rift or rift relaxation sub-stage has also been interpreted in the evolution and filling of the Oslo Graben. Variable rates of rotation across individual fault blocks initiated by subsidence have been interpreted in the upper Jurassic infill across the Oseberg Field. Several rotational maxima led to the deposition of wedge-shaped units downflank in hanging wall positions, in response to footwall crestal uplift and erosion. Interbedded tabular units were deposited during periods of general tectonic subsidence and minor rotation. Because the sedimentary infilling is a response to this tectonic scenario, a pattern of syn-rift architecture is recognizable, although it can be obscured by variation in sediment supply and sea-level. In the late-Jurassic sub-basins of the Northern North Sea, syn-rift units which develop in the hanging wall infill consist of basal units of turbiditic sandstones and overlying shales which are sometimes also capped by marine and coastal plain sandstones if the sediment supply is sufficient. Examples of this type of architecture are illustrated in the main rift units of Statfjord North and Gyda Fields. The Visund fault block and the Oseberg-Brage infill are examples from marine half-grabens which are near the central or axial zones of the northern North Sea rift complex, far from the main hinterland areas and show deepening upward trends into basinal shales.

The syn-rift unconformity describes the erosion surface that bevels fault blocks during continental rifting. It develops locally over individual fault blocks because of footwall uplift and lithospheric unloading by extension. The syn-rift unconformity separates the rift from the following post-rift stage and, with the exception of faulted terrain, it is the most pronounced feature of rift basins. A northern North Sea example is in the Snorre Field where its crestal part was exposed to subaerial and subaqueous erosion during much of the late Jurassic and as much as 1 km of sediments has been removed in the northern part of the block. Other fault blocks in the North Sea, such as the Oseberg fault block, have rounded or flat tops resulting from erosion and peneplanation down to sea level.

=== Post-rift stage ===
Lithospheric extension and rift basin formation are followed by an asymptotically decreasing post-rift subsidence, caused by thermal contraction and relaxation of the heated crust. Such thermal subsidence typically spans about 100 Ma before thermal equilibrium is reached. This process typically occurs over a wider area than the original syn-rift subsidence, resulting in an elongated, saucer-shaped basing morphology and onlapping of post-rift strata against basin margins as well as onto remnant syn-rift topography.

The major bounding faults of the northern North Sea palaeorift system, the East Shetland and Oygarden Fault Zones, are examples of such long-lived fault zones. In addition, the Viking Graben master faults bounding the East Shetland Platform to the west and the Horda Platform to the east acted as frontal shoulder faults during late Jurassic-early Cretaceous rifting. The early Cretaceous post-rift phase in the northern North Sea was characterized by slow subsidence, with much of the sedimentation accommodated by the infilling of previous rift bathymetry. At this time the shoulders of the rift were supported. During latest Cretaceous and Tertiary the shoulders lost their support, producing elongated, saucer-shaped basin and a 'steer's head' cross-sectional basin shape.

Sediment architectures resulting from post-rift subsidence are generally much more simple than those produced during active stretching. Because maximum subsidence occur along the rift axis, post-rift successions tend to have a backstepping character. This is accentuated by a common decrease in sediment input as drainage basins become eroded and lose their significance. The gradual passage from continental coarse clastic sediments into shallow marine shales in the middle Triassic-lower Jurassic post-rift succession in the northern North Sea serves as a good example of such a model. During the Cretaceous, low-relief drainage areas are completely transgressed and the clastic supply is shut off. A return to clastic sedimentation is seen in the Tertiary post-rift filling of the North Sea which is related to compaction and external tectonics.
