= TAQA =

Government controlled energy holding company of Abu Dhabi

Abu Dhabi National Energy Company, PJSC
- Trade name: TAQA
- Company type: State-owned
- Traded as: ADX: TAQA
- Industry: Oil and gas exploration and production, pipelines, underground gas storage, power generation and water desalination
- Founded: 2005; 21 years ago
- Headquarters: Abu Dhabi, United Arab Emirates
- Number of locations: Canada, Ghana, India, Iraq, Morocco, Oman, Saudi Arabia, the United Arab Emirates, Netherlands, United Kingdom and United States
- Owner: Government of Abu Dhabi
- Number of employees: 2,700 (2013)
- Subsidiaries: TAQA North, TAQA Bratani
- Website: www.taqa.com

The Abu Dhabi National Energy Company, PJSC (TAQA) is a government controlled energy holding company of Abu Dhabi, United Arab Emirates. The company currently operates in 11 countries across four continents.

== History ==
The beginnings of TAQA lie within Abu Dhabi's 1998 government initiative, seeking to privatize the Emirate's water and electricity sector. Following the establishment of the Abu Dhabi Water and Electricity Authority (ADWEA).

TAQA was founded in June 2005 pursuant to the provisions of an Emiri Decree in 2005 as a public joint stock company. ADWEA served as the founding shareholder, holding 51% of the company.

In May 2006 TAQA appointed Peter E. Barker-Homek, an American businessman, as its first CEO. TAQA expanded quickly under the guidance of Barker-Homek, making several key acquisitions in Africa and North America. In Canada, TAQA acquired Northrock Resources Ltd.(US$2 billion), Pioneer Natural Resources Canada Inc (US$540 million) and PrimeWest Energy Trust (US$5 billion).

In 2008 TAQA acquired several North Sea assets from Shell U.K. Limited and Esso Exploration and Production (UK) Limited. The purchase included all equity, associated infrastructure and production licenses relating to the Tern, Eider, Cormorant North, South Cormorant, Kestrel and Pelican fields and related sub-sea satellite fields.

In late 2009, Barker-Homek relinquished his position as CEO and was replaced by Carl Sheldon. Sheldon had joined TAQA as General Counsel in 2008.

In 2010, Barker-Homek sued TAQA under breach of contract allegations, claiming that he was fired because he spoke out against "fraudulent and unethical practices" at TAQA and was threatened with arrest and imprisonment if he had not signed his severance agreement to leave the company. The lawsuit was dismissed by Michigans District Court Judge John Corbett O'Meara in 2011.

In 2010, following huge investments and an asset increase of more than 300% between 2005 and 2008 (to $23 billion), Sheldon announced a "period of consolidation" and "organic growth", focusing on operational profitability.

In 2012, TAQA sold their Tesla shares in order to finance investments into a power plant in the Kurdistan region of Iraq.

In 2014 Carl Sheldon left the company and handed over his responsibilities to Edward LaFehr, who took on the newly created role of Chief Operating Officer. LaFehr was previously President of TAQA's North America business. In 2016, LaFehr left TAQA and was replaced by acting COO, Al Dhaheri.

In 2019, TAQA reported for Q1 a 95% decline profit because of foreign exchange losses and revaluation of its power assets in the US. In H1 2019 revenues by 5% compared to H1 2018.

In July 2020, TAQA and ADPower announced the successful completion of their merger. This created one of the largest utilities in the region. Its total assets are estimated at AED 200 billion, making Taqa the third largest listed company in the UAE and one of the top ten utilities in Europe, Middle East and Africa (EMEA).

In December 2021, TAQA and Abu Dhabi National Oil Company (ADNOC) announced a $3.6 billion project to aim to reduce the carbon footprint of ADNOC's offshore production operations by more than 30%.

TAQA was ranked 11th on Forbes Middle East's Top 100 Listed Companies 2025 list.

== Massar Solutions ==
Massar Solutions is a publicly traded global transportation and logistics company headquartered in UAE. It was formed as a limited company in 1998. A majority of the company's stock is owned by Abu Dhabi Investment Company and Abu Dhabi National Energy Company PJSC (TAQA). Abu Dhabi National Energy Company PJSC (TAQA) bought 49% shareholding in Massar solutions earlier called Al Wathba Company for Central Services PJSC. Massar Solutions started its operations in the year 1998 and manages a fleet of 16000 vehicles. In 1998, the Emirate of Abu Dhabi moved the water and electricity sector into the private sector, Massar was integrated as an exclusively owned subsidiary of Abu Dhabi Water & Electricity Authority. In the year 2005, Abu Dhabi Investment Company purchased 51% shares of Massar from Abu Dhabi Power Corporation, a subsidiary of Abu Dhabi Water & Electricity Authority. Abu Dhabi National Energy Company PJSC (TAQA) bought 49% shareholding in Massar.

== Corporate structure ==
=== Overview of personnel ===
Notable members of the board of directors of the company are as follows:

- Mohamed Hassan Al Suwaidi, Chairman
- Jasim Husain Thabet, Chief Executive Officer
- Saeed Mubarak Al-Hajeri, Vice Chairman
- Khaleefa Al Qamzi, Vice-Chairman
- Khaled Abdulla Al-Mass, Board Member
- Mohammed Sahoo AlSuwaidi, Board Member
- Salem Sultan Al Daheri, Board Member

=== Shareholders ===
TAQA is listed on the Abu Dhabi Securities Exchange. The company is 75.1% indirectly owned by the government of Abu Dhabi. The government of Abu Dhabi through ADWEA owns 51%, ADWEA transferred 21.7% of its shareholding to the Fund for the Support of Farm Owners in the Emirate of Abu Dhabi Shareholders. 0.3% are owned by other Government related entities. The balance (24.9%) is traded publicly on the Abu Dhabi Securities Market, which is limited to Emirati nationals.

== Finance ==
Standard & Poor's has assigned A+/A-1 corporate credit ratings to TAQA. Moody's has assigned a rating of Aa3 to TAQA's long term foreign and local currency obligations.

== Operations ==
TAQA's main focus of investments is the companies engaged in power generation, water desalination, and production and storage of oil and gas. In addition, it has invested in the mining, metal, and service sector.

TAQA has investments in over 60 companies. Its principal wholly owned subsidiaries include Emirates Power Company, Gulf Power Company, Arabian United Power Company, Al Shuweihat Power Company, Taweelah United Power Company, Union Power Holding Company, TAQA Bratani Limited, TAQA Energy B.V., TAQA North Ltd. and Takoradi International Company, operator of the Takoradi Power Station II. Through the acquisition of CMS Generation, TAQA has assets in the UAE, Ghana, Morocco, Saudi Arabia and India.

=== Persian Gulf Region ===
==== Abu Dhabi ====
TAQAs business roots lie in the local power and water desalination plants in Abu Dhabi. The company supplies around 85% of the Emirates power and 90% of water demands, through the operation of eight power and desalination plants in the UAE. The plants are 54% owned by TAQA, 6% by ADWEA and 40% by various international shareholders. All productions is sold under fixed power and water purchase agreements (PWPAs) to Abu Dhabi Water and Electricity Company (ADWEC).

Further power plants operated in other countries currently consist of one plant in Morocco (85.79% ownership), one in Oman (40%), one in India (99.9%), one in Saudi Arabia (25%), one in Ghana (90%) and two in the USA (JV with output rights / 50%).

==== Oman ====
TAQA owns a 40% stake in the Sohar Aluminum smelter and the connected 1,000 MW Sohar Aluminum Power Plant (SAPP), whose output is mostly used to power the aluminum plant, that has a production of around 360,000 tons of aluminum per year. The stake was acquired in 2010.

==== Saudi Arabia ====
In Saudi Arabia, TAQA owns a 25% stake in the 250 MW Jubail power plant, which powers the SADAF Petrochemical Plant.

In addition to the Persian Gulf region, TAQA has assets in Europe, Asia and Africa and America, including investments in Canada, Netherlands, the UK and the USA. It has interests in the Tern Alpha, Eider Alpha, Cormorant North, Cormorant Alpha, Kestrel and Pelican fields and related sub-sea satellite fields in the North Sea.

=== Africa ===
Through the subsidiary Jorf Lasfar Energy Company (JLEC), TAQA supplies around 50% of Moroccos electricity demands and operation at the Jorf Lasfar power station was expanded from 1,356 to 2,056 MW capacity in 2014.

In Ghana, TAQA operates a 220 MW power plants in Takoradi, 220 km west of Accra. The plants capacity was increased to 330 MW with construction starting in 2013 and finishing in 2015. The plant now provides around 15% of Ghanas total generation capacity.

=== India ===
In India, TAQA operates a 250 MW lignite-powered plant in Neyveli, Tamil Nadu, and has interest in the 100 MW Sorang hydro power project in the northern Himachal Pradesh state. The plant is powered by the Sorang Khad river. The stakes were acquired by TAQA in 2014 for around $600 million from the Indian Jaypee Group.

=== Iraq ===
TAQA holds a majority share (53.2%) and is operator of the Atrush block located 85 km northwest of Erbil in the Kurdistan region of Iraq. Initial production is expected to be approximately 30,000 barrels of oil equivalent per day. TAQA acquired the interest for $600 million from an affiliate of Aspect Holdings in 2012.

=== North America ===
TAQA operates different assets in Canada and the United States. Operations on the continent are focused on conventional oil and gas exploration, and production and power generation. In the US, the company has invested in the Red Oak Power plant in Sayerville, New Jersey (85%) and the Lakefield wind farm in Jackson County, Minnesota.

In Canada, its investments lie within the oil and gas development of fields around Calgary and British Columbia, which began with the acquisition of Northrock Resources for $2 billion, Pioneer Natural Resources Canada (Pioneer Canada) for $540 million and the PrimeWest Energy Trust (PrimeWest) for C$4.6 billion in 2007.

=== Turkey ===
On January 3, 2013, TAQA signed an agreement with Turkey to invest about $12 billion to develop the coal fields in the Southern Turkey. This deal is considered as the second biggest Arab investment in Turkey in the energy sector. In August 2013, TAQA said it would delay the planned investment amid difficult financing conditions at a time of currency volatility in emerging markets including Turkey.

=== UK and Netherlands ===
TAQA started operations in Europe by acquiring different gas exploration and production (E&P) assets from BP Netherlands in 2007. Further investments followed in the UK and Scotland in subsequent years (2008-2011).

In August 2009, it bought a 15% interest in North Sea assets from the L11b Group and took over the operatorship of the L11b-A production platform. On 3 August 2009, TAQA took over operatorship of the North Sea Brent Oil Pipelines System. In addition, in 2006 TAQA acquired BP Nederland Energie B.V. Through this acquisition, TAQA now holds onshore and off-shore production assets, including the Piek Gas Installatie facility in Alkmaar, the project of the largest offshore LNG Regas facilities utilizing the depleted field P15/P18 just off the port of Rotterdam, and partnership in the Bergermeer gas storage project. TAQA operates Gas Storage Bergermeer, which is Europes largest, open-access, gas storage facility with 46-terawatt-hours (TWh) of seasonal storage capacity. The facility is operated in cooperation with Gazprom.

In November 2012, BP sold its stakes in several U.K North Sea oil and gas fields (with a production capacity of 21,000 barrels per day (3,300 m^{3}/d) equivalent) to TAQA for just over $1 billion.

TAQAs production in 2016 totaled 17,410 megawatt in power generation, 917 million gallons per day in water desalination and 137,300 barrels per day (21,830 m^{3}/d) equivalent.

== See also ==
- Economy of the United Arab Emirates
- Abu Dhabi Developmental Holding Company
