= Thistle oil field =

Large oil field in the North Sea

Coordinates: 61°21′47″N 1°34′47″E

The Thistle oil field is a large oil field in the northern sector of the North Sea. The oil field, discovered in September 1972 by Signal Oil and Gas, is produced over the Thistle Alpha platform, located 125 nautical miles northeast of Sumburgh, Shetland Islands and 275 nautical miles Northeast of Aberdeen, Scotland.

Licence P236 was awarded as part of the UKCS fourth round in 1972, and the first well on the site was drilled and completed in July 1973 when the Thistle oil field was confirmed as a commercial discovery. The oil has a gravity of 38.4°API. The oil field is estimated to have a reserve of roughly 824 million barrels of oil. The nearby Deveron field, also produced over the Thistle Alpha platform, was discovered in 1972 following the successful completion of a second well on the site. A 1997 seismic re-interpretation site's estimated the reserves to be roughly 61.3 million barrels of oil.

Production commenced for partners BNOC, Britoil and BP on the site in 1978. Ownership of the operations licence for the site was subsequently transferred to DNO in 2003, followed by Lundin in 2004 before the de-merging of Lundin's UK assets in 2010, when EnQuest became the operator. The site is currently operated in partnership between EnQuest and BP, with EnQuest holding over 99% of the total ownership of the site.

== Thistle Alpha platform ==
The Thistle Alpha platform is a fixed installation, which consists of a 60-slot drilling and production platform. It was built by Laing Offshore at the Graythorp Dry Dock, Teesside now renamed TERRC

The jacket is a conventional steel tower structure approximately 183 meters tall with a base measuring 85 meters by 82 meters and weighs 31,500 tonnes with an integral Module Sub Frame (MSF), and is secured by steel piles driven 143 meters into the seabed. The Thistle Alpha platform was installed and completed in 1976.

The installation comprises a steel jacket with four main legs, supporting 36 modules arranged on 3 deck levels. 28 of these modules contain the equipment and machinery, which constitute the production, utilities, drilling systems and facilities. The remaining 8 modules situated on the southeast end of the installation contain living quarters (LQ), offices, the central control room (CCR), the helideck and workshops. The platform was installed on the jacket in 1978.

Oil from the Thistle and Deveron reservoirs is recovered by platform wells. The oil is processed through a two-stage production separation system. Stabilized oil is metered and exported using the main oil line pumps to the Brent Pipeline System. The original gas compression system has been decommissioned as a result of a small volume of gas separated from the oil being flared. Produced water is cleaned and discharged to the sea.

Oil is imported from the Dons field via an 8" pipeline, and combined with oil produced by the Thistle platform. The combined oil production is exported from the Thistle platform through a 16" pipeline through the Brent Pipeline System via the Dunlin and Cormorant platforms to the Sullom Voe Oil Terminal.

Gas is imported from the Northern Leg Gas Pipeline (NLGP) system. A portion of the imported gas is used for as fuel to provide the Thistle installation with power, with the remainder exported to the Dunlin and Northern Producer installations.

== Production history ==
Production through the Thistle Alpha platform production system peaked at 130,000 barrels per day in the early 1980s and fell to a low of about 3,750 barrels per day in 2008.

EnQuest took over the field from Lundin in 2008 and commenced the Thistle Late Life Extension (LLX) strategy. This strategy is currently delivering twice as much production in 2012 as was delivered in 2008, with the potential for more in the future.

In 2014 the Thistle Alpha produced more than 3 million barrels of oil, the first time since 1997.

== Thistle Late Life Extension ==
The Thistle Late Life Extension (LLX) Strategy aims to recover over 35 million barrels of oil over the next 15 years from the Thistle and Deveron oil fields, using a mixture of existing well stock and new wells. A drill rig re-activation project has been completed and has successfully delivered several new wells and well renovations to date with an industry leading-safety record.

The Thistle LLX strategy will also ensure that the Thistle platform will be operable to 2025 and beyond. To achieve this, a series of major activities have started including initiatives to provide reliable power, improve structural and topsides integrity, upgrade safety and control systems and simplify the platform oil and production and water treatment processes. These activities are scheduled to run from 2012 to 2015, dependent upon receipt of the UK Government support through the Brown Field Allowance (BFA).

== Thistle Alpha platform structural concerns ==
On 21 October 2019 all production on the Thistle Alpha was shut down and the platform was fully evacuated as a precaution following a routine subsea inspection of the jacket's structural condition. On board at the time were 115 staff, who were removed by in-field and UK Coastguard helicopters to the Dunlin Alpha platform.

In light of the low oil prices associated with the coronavirus pandemic EnQuest decided to cease production on Thistle. In September 2020 the UK Oil and Gas Authority accepted the Cessation of Production justification. In September 2021 EnQuest submitted its decommissioning plan for the Thistle Alpha platform.
