= Hutton oilfield =

Oil field in the United Kingdom

- Location within North Sea
- Country: Scotland, United Kingdom
- Region: North Sea
- Location: East Shetland Basin
- Offshore/onshore: Offshore
- Coordinates: 60.295°N 1.926°E
- Operator: ConocoPhillips

Field history
- Discovery: 1973

The Hutton oil field, located on the UK continental shelf, was the location for the first ever production Tension Leg Platform (TLP).

== History ==
The Hutton oil field is situated in the East Shetland Basin in the UK North Sea on the western side of the Viking Graben. It straddles UK Blocks 211/27 and 211/28. The field was discovered in July 1973 by ConocoPhillips well 211/28-la and was operated by Conoco (UK) Limited. The field is named after James Hutton, an eighteenth-century geologist, known as the father of geology.

== Geology ==
The structure comprises a series of southwesterly dipping tilted fault blocks. The reservoir sandstones are Middle Jurassic in age and were deposited as a result of deltaic progradation across the Hutton area. The oil bearing Brent Group sandstones vary in thickness from 150 ft to 380 ft with average porosities of 22% and permeabilities of 500-2000 md in the producing zones. Original recoverable reserves were estimated at 190 million barrels, of which the field has produced 107 million barrels by 1991.

== Production ==
Production of the field began in August 1984 and increased rapidly to a peak in 1986 with a total annual production value of 34 million barrels (5.4 million cubic metres). This then declined alarmingly and was stabilized somewhat with the introduction of water injection. By 1995 production rates were falling once again with just over 1 million bbl (160 thousand m^{3}) produced over the first five months of 2001. The field was retired in summer 2001 having produced approximately 265 million bbl (42.1 million m^{3}) over its lifetime, exceeding the initial estimates of 190 million bbl (30 million m^{3}) of recoverable oil.

== Facility ==
Vickers Offshore (Projects & Developments), had been working on the TLP Concept since 1974. The Hutton topsides design was awarded in 1981 to Brown & Root. The integrated topsides was built at the McDermott Ardersier yard in Scotland, and the hull at the HiFab Nigg yard. Hutton TLP was installed in 1984 by Aker Offshore. It was the first Tension Leg Platform permanently moored to the sea floor via tethers or tendons at each of the structures corners. Tethers could be removed and replaced using an innovative polar crane located at the top of the four corner columns.

The Hutton TLP was originally designed for a service life of 25 years in the North Sea depth of 100 to 1000 metres. It had 16 tension legs. Its weigh varied between 46,500 and 55,000 tons when moored to the seabed, but up to 61,580 tons when floating freely. The total area of its living quarters was about 3,500 square metres and accommodated over 100 cabins though only 40 people were necessary to maintain the structure in place.

At the time of decommissioning the field was operated by Kerr-McGee. The TLP platform was removed for re-use outside the UK when the platform was purchased by Sevmorneftegaz, a subsidiary of Gazprom, in August 2002, and after having its decommissioning programme accepted by the UK Government.

The floating platform was towed to Murmansk in Russia where the topsides facilities and main hull were de-mated. Subsequently, the topsides were transported by barge to the Sevmash fabrication yard at Severodvinsk, where they were temporarily stored while undergoing refurbishment and refitting.

After completion the topsides were reinstalled onto a new hull structure of the Prirazlomnaya platform, and will be towed into position ready for a new role in the development of the Prirazlomnoye Field, 1,200 kilometres (750 mi) north east of Arkhangelsk in the Pechora Sea. In early 2009 the hull of the former Hutton TLP was being towed from Murmansk to the Gulf of Mexico for reinstalling on a new structure, however the project was cancelled, and hull is currently cold-stacked in the Cromarty Firth, Scotland. In May 2021 the Hutton TLP Hull was purchased and is currently undergoing decommissioning at Invergordon effectively completely its life close to the place it was constructed.

== North West Hutton ==
The North West Hutton field is located 130 km north-east of the Shetland Islands in Block 211/27a in the UK North Sea. The water depth is 143m. The field was discovered in 1975 by the Amoco Group and the installation was operated by Amoco (UK) Exploration Company, the field had total estimated reserves of 487 million barrels of oil equivalent (boe). The Reservoir is a Middle Jurassic sandstone at a depth of 11,500 feet. The oil has an API gravity of 37°, a Gas Oil Ratio of 550 scf/bbl. The total recoverable reserves were 185 Million barrels of oil, 16 Million barrels of Natural Gas Liquids, and 56,392 Million cubic feet of gas.

The North West Hutton steel jacket platform was constructed by McDermott Scotland at Ardersier and was installed (61°06’24”N 01°31’33”E.) in September 1981 and production began in 1983. The topsides were designed by McDermot Engineering. The plant had a capacity of 50,000 barrels of oil per day and 30,000 barrels of produced water per day. The plant comprised two parallel 3-phase (oil, gas and produced water) first stage separators operating at a pressure of 440 kPa and a common 3-phase second stage separator operating at a pressure of 241 kPa. Oil shipping pumps with a capacity of 55,000 barrels per day delivered oil to the export pipeline to the Cormorant A installation at a pressure of 3447 kPa. Gas from the first stage and second stage separators was compressed to a pressure of 7791 kPa. Gas was dehydrated in a counter-current glycol dehydrator operating at 1000 kPa, the gas stream could also be passed through a zinc oxide unit to remove sulphur compounds. A turbo-expander/re-compressor unit and a Joule-Thomson valve allowed the gas to expand and chill (from 7550 kPa at 11 °C to 3931 kPa at –13 °C) to extract natural gas liquids (NGL). These, together with condensate from the compressor scrubbers, was co-mingled with the export oil stream. There was also a facility to reinject NGL to a well. Gas was re-compressed in the Sales Gas Compressors to a pressure of 13894 kPa for export by pipeline at a flowrate of 6.9 million cubic feet (200 thousand cubic metres) per day at standard conditions or in later field life for gas lift of the wells at 65.3 million ft^{3} (1.85 million m^{3}) per day. Gas was exported to the Ninian Central installation. The first stage compressor (6702 brake horse power, BHP) and second stage compressors (5128 BHP) were driven by gas turbines as were the sales gas compressors (2700 BHP and 1630 BHP). Fuel gas consumption on the platform was 14.7 million ft^{3} (420 thousand m^{3}) per day. In later field life hydrocyclones were installed to remove oil from the produced water streams prior to discharge to sea.

Design capacity was 130,000 bopd and a water injection capacity of 100,000 bwpd. Peak production was 85,000 bopd plus 35 MMSCFD gas in 1983.

Production on North West Hutton ceased in 2002, and the Department of Trade and Industry approved decommissioning in 2006. The topsides were removed in 2009.
