= Cormorant oilfield =

Oilfield in Shetland, Scotland

- Location within North Sea
- Country: Scotland, United Kingdom
- Region: Shetland basin
- Block: 211/26a
- Offshore/onshore: Offshore
- Coordinates: 61°06′9″N 1°4′22″E
- Operator: TAQA Bratani

Field history
- Discovery: September 1972
- Start of production: 1979
- Peak year: 1979

Production
- Estimated oil in place: 90 million barrels (~1.2×10^{7} t)
- Estimated gas in place: 600×10^{9} cu ft (17×10^{9} m^{3})

The Cormorant oilfield is located 161 kilometres (100 mi) northeast of Lerwick, Shetland, Scotland. It was discovered in September 1972 at a depth of 150 metres (490 ft). The oil reservoir is located at a depth of 2,895 metres (9,498 ft). Production started in December 1979 from the Cormorant Alpha platform and operates from two platforms and an underwater manifold centre.

== Description ==
The Cormorant oilfield is located 161 kilometres (100 mi) northeast of Lerwick, Shetland, Scotland, in block number 211/26a. It was discovered in September 1972 at a depth of 150 metres (490 ft). Estimated recovery is 90 million barrels (14×10^{6} m^{3}) of oil. The oil reservoir is located at a depth of 2,895 metres (9,498 ft). The discovery well, 211/26-1 was drilled by semi-submersible rig Staflo.

Originally, it was operated by Shell and licensed to Shell/Esso. On 7 July 2008, it was purchased by Abu Dhabi National Energy Company.

== Production ==
Production operates from two Cormorant platforms. Details of the construction are given in the table.

Cormorant platforms – construction
Installation	Fabrication contractor	Site	Type	Installation date
North Cormorant	Redpath de Groot Caledonian, Union Industriellee et d'Enterprise	Methil	Steel jacket	July 1985
South Cormorant (Cormorant Alpha)	McAlpine / Sea Tank	Ardyne Point	Concrete	May 1978

In addition, an Underwater Manifold Centre (controlled from the Cormorant platform) also produces oil. This started up in mid 1983. It has a design capacity for 50,000 barrels per day (7,900 m^{3}/d). The UMC lost communications several years ago, but a project ongoing in 2006 is looking to produce from the UMC once again. Also a single satellite well (P1) is linked to the platform with a design capacity of 10,000 barrels per day (1,600 m^{3}/d).

=== Cormorant Alpha ===
Production started in December 1979 from the Cormorant Alpha platform. This platform is a concrete gravity platform of the Sea Tank Co type. It has four legs and storage capacity for 1 million barrels (160,000 m^{3}) of oil. The total sub-structure weight is 294,655 tonnes and it is designed to carry a topsides weight of 32,350 tonnes.

The topsides facilities included capability to drill, produce, meter and pump oil. It also has capability to re-inject water to maintain reservoir pressure. Peak production was 24,000 barrels per day (3,800 m^{3}/d) in 1979. The platform is also the starting point for the Brent System pipeline, a major communications centre and the location of Brent Log - air traffic control for Northern North Sea helicopter traffic.

The topsides for Cormorant Alpha were designed by Matthew Hall Engineering, which was awarded the contract in October 1974. Initially there were facilities for 17 oil production wells, 18 water injection wells and one gas injection well. The production capacity was 60,000 barrels of oil per day and 900,000 standard cubic metres of gas per day. There was a single production train of three stages of separation with the first stage operating at a pressure of 30 barg. The 16 subsea storage cells had a capacity of 600,000 barrels. Electricity generation was powered by one 12 MW Rolls-Royce Avon gas turbine and four 2.5 MW Solar Mars gas turbines. The topside accommodation was for 200 people. There are 16 topsides modules and the topsides weight was 25,000 tonnes.

Natural gas is exported from Cormorant Alpha via the Vesterled gas pipeline which connect into the FLAGS pipeline at Brent Alpha to St Fergus Gas Terminal.

In 2024 the Cormorant Alpha platform was closed for further operation, and decommissioning is scheduled to start and continue along with the decommissioning of platform Brae Alpha in the Brae oilfield. The well operations on Cormorant Alpha platform was closed at 07:45am on Sunday, June 2024.

== Accidents ==
A Norwegian organisation states that the Cormorant A platform almost sank in 1977 during its construction in Norway. This was disputed in a TV documentary on 7 May 2007.

An explosion on 3 March 1983 killed two people outright and another died of burns later in hospital. The Cormorant Alpha crew waited inside the safe accommodation area for 2–3 days while the weather remained too bad for general helicopter evacuations, and eventually stood down and back to work a week or so later.

On 16 January 2013 and again on 2 March 2013, a hydrocarbon leak in one of the legs of the platform was reported. Personnel were evacuated from the platform and the Brent System was closed down, however no oil had been spilt into the sea. Many environmental groups called for the UK and Scottish governments to regulate the industry and the "aging" platforms more closely.

== See also ==
- Energy policy of the United Kingdom
- Energy use and conservation in the United Kingdom
