= Mikhail Fridman =

Russian–Israeli billionaire businessman and oligarch (born 1964)

- Михаил Фридман
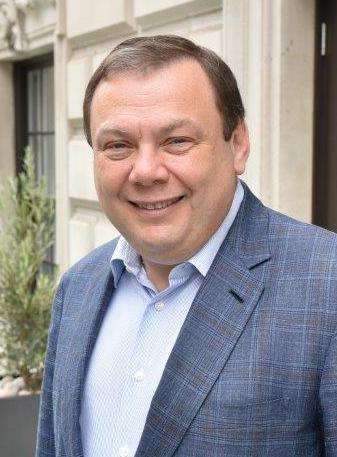
- Fridman in 2015
- Born: 21 April 1964 (age 62); Lviv, Ukrainian SSR, Soviet Union
- Citizenship: Russia; Israel
- Education: Moscow Institute of Steel and Alloys
- Occupations: Co-founder of LetterOne, Alfa Group, and Alfa-Bank
- Years active: 1986–present
- Known for: Indigo Era
- Children: 4
- Awards: Golden Plate Award (2003)
- Website: mikhail-fridman-site.com

Mikhail Maratovich Fridman (also transliterated Mikhail Friedman; Russian: Михаил Маратович Фридман; Hebrew: מיכאיל פרידמן; born 21 April 1964) is a Ukrainian-born, Russian–Israeli tycoon and oligarch. He is one of the co-founders of Alfa-Group, a multinational Russian conglomerate. According to Forbes, he was the second-richest Russian as of 2013 ($16.5 billion), moving down to ninth-richest Russian in 2023 ($12.6 billion). In May 2017, he was also ranked as Russia's most important businessman by bne IntelliNews. In February 2024, Fridman had a net worth of $13.1 billion, according to the Bloomberg Billionaires Index.

In 1991, he co-founded Alfa-Bank, one of the largest private banks in Russia. After being CEO of TNK-BP, the 50/50 TNK-BP joint venture, for nine years, in 2013 he sold his stake in the company and co-founded the international investment company LetterOne (L1). Until 2022 Fridman was chairman of the supervisory board of Alfa Group Consortium, and was on the boards of Alfa-Bank and ABH Holdings.

Prior to 2022, he was on the supervisory board of directors for VEON (formerly Vimpelcom) and X5 Retail Group. He is a member of the supervisory board of DEA Deutsche Erdoel AG, which is owned by LetterOne. Fridman has been a member of numerous public-facing bodies, including the Russian Union of Industrialists and Entrepreneurs, the Public Chamber of Russia, and the Council on Foreign Relations.

In 2022, the EU imposed sanctions on Fridman in response to the 2022 Russian invasion of Ukraine. Fridman claimed the EU's allegations were false and defamatory. He subsequently decided to step down from the boards of LetterOne and Alfa Group, so that they could avoid sanctions. As reported by several media, Fridman has already filed lawsuits challenging sanctions on at least two occasions, like in July 2022 and in December 2022.

In December 2022, a man reported by Russian state media to be Fridman was arrested in London by the UK's National Crime Agency, on charges of money laundering, conspiracy to defraud the Home Office and conspiracy to commit perjury. The UK National Crime Agency did not name the man, stating only that it had detained a 58-year-old "wealthy Russian businessman" at a "multi-million-pound residence". He was later released on bail. Subsequently, the agency scaled back its probe. In September 2023 the National Crime Agency closed the investigation.

In October 2023, Fridman reportedly announced to return to Russia.

== Early life and education ==
Fridman was born in 1964 in Lviv, Ukrainian SSR, USSR, where he spent his youth. He graduated from high school in Lviv in 1980. He says he was denied entrance to Moscow's top physics college because he is Jewish, and instead attended the Moscow Institute of Steel and Alloys. He had various jobs while a college student in Moscow, including washing windows and founding and co-owning a student discothèque named Strawberry Fields. He also led a group of students who would queue for tickets at popular Moscow plays, and then use the tickets as hard currency to barter for rare goods and favours. Having studied metallurgical engineering, he graduated with distinction from the Moscow Institute of Steel and Alloys in 1986.

== Career ==
=== Early years and Alfa companies (1980s–1990s) ===
After graduation Fridman worked as a metallurgical design engineer at the Elektrostal Metallurgical Works, a state electrical machinery factory, from 1986 to 1988. As Soviet leader Mikhail Gorbachev began to open up the economy in the late 1980s, in 1988 Fridman established a window-washing business, an apartment rental agency for foreigners, a company that sold used computers, and a company that imported cigarettes and perfumes, with fellow friends from college, employing students from various Moscow universities.

Armenian Robert Yengibaryan (Russian: Роберт Енгибарян) provided strong assistance to Fridman and, later, Yengibaryan's son Vahe Yengebaryan (Russian: Ваге Енгибарян), who was the Russian consul in New York from 2003 onwards, became very close to Fridman's business interests. In October 2019, Fridman told a Spanish court that he was a friend of Vahe.

In 1988, along with German Khan and Alexey Kuzmichev, Fridman co-founded Alfa-Photo (also transliterated as Alfa-Foto), which imported photography chemicals. In 1989 the three partners founded Alfa-Eco (Alfa-Echo, Alfa-Eko, Alfa-Ekho), a commodities and eventually oil trading firm, and Alfa Capital (Alfa Kapital), an investment firm. Alfa-Eco and Alfa Capital developed into Alfa Group Consortium. The company, which initially focused on computer trading and copy machine maintenance, expanded into imports and exports and commodities trading, eventually becoming one of Russia's largest privately owned financial-industrial conglomerates, with interests in industries such as telecommunications, banking, retail, and oil.

Using $100,000 of his profits from his businesses to pay the required fee, in January 1991 Fridman co-founded Alfa-Bank. The company grew to become one of the largest private banks in Russia. Alfa Group's later divisions include Rosvodokanal, a private water utility; AlfaStrakhovanie, a diversified insurance company; A1 Group, an investment company; and X5 Retail Group, a large chain of food retailers.

Alfa Group flourished considerably after Fridman recruited Petr Aven, the former Minister of Foreign Economic Relations for the Russian Federation; in 1994 Aven became president and chairman of Alfa-Bank. By late 1996, thanks to the success of Alfa-Bank and Alfa Group, Boris Berezovsky, in an interview by the Financial Times, named Fridman and Aven among the seven businessman and bankers who controlled most of the economy and media in Russia, and who had helped bankroll Boris Yeltsin's 1996 re-election campaign. Both Fridman and Aven were quite close to Berezovsky. In his book The age of Berezovsky Aven says: "It was Fridman and I who happened to be by Boris's bed after his attempted assassination in 1994, and it was our yacht that he chose to go after being discharged from hospital".

Fridman and Aven sold off most of their Russian government securities in early August 1998, prior to the ruble crisis of 17 August 1998, and emerged relatively unhurt from the 1998 Russian financial crisis. During the crisis, Alfa-Bank used its holdings related to TNK to avoid a debt default, and was one of the few Russian banks at the time to continue to allow customer withdrawals.

=== Retail holdings and X5 Retail (1995 to present) ===
Fridman's Alfa Group founded the Perekrestok (also transliterated Perekriostok) chain of supermarkets in Moscow in 1995. Through a merger with the Pyatyorochka (also transliterated Pyaterochka) supermarket chain, which had been founded in St. Petersburg in 1999 by Alexander Girda and Andrey Rogachev, Alfa Group founded the X5 Retail Group in 2006. X5 acquired another grocer, Kopeyka, for $1.65 billion in December 2010. X5 is Russia's largest food retailer in terms of sales.

=== Alfa Telecom and Altimo (2001–2015) ===
Alfa Group acquired a 44% stake in Golden Telecom, a large telecommunications and internet company in Russia and the Commonwealth of Independent States, in 2001. Also in 2001, Alfa purchased a strategic ownership interest in Vimpelcom, a large cellular operator in Russia, and Fridman joined Vimpelcom's board of directors.

Alfa Group consolidated its telecom holdings as Alfa Telecom, and in 2005 renamed it Altimo. Its holdings and acquisitions included MegaFon, Vimpelcom, Golden Telecom, and Kyivstar. In December 2005 Altimo also acquired a 13.2% interest in Turkcell, the largest telecoms company in Turkey.

Fridman's desire to merge Vimpelcom and Kyivstar was thwarted by his Vimpelcom partner, the Norwegian telecoms group Telenor, which held stakes in both companies. Fridman resorted to protracted and aggressive efforts to strong-arm Telenor in 2005, and although the merger of Vimpelcom and Kyivstar was achieved in 2010, conflicts with Telenor over control of Vimpelcom lasted seven years in total.

From 2003 until 2007 Fridman's Altimo was locked in a complex four-year battle of claims and counter-claims of fraud with the Bermuda-based investment firm IPOC International Growth Fund associated with Leonid Reiman and Jeffrey Galmond over ownership of a 25.1% stake in MegaFon that was formerly held by Leonid Rozhetskin's LV Finance. James Hatt, a British telecommunications executive, represented Fridman's interests while Jeffrey Galmond, a Danish attorney, represented Reiman's interests during deliberations between the two groups. Altimo's ownership of the stake was finally maintained in 2007. During the dispute in 2005, Altimo hired the Haley Barbour-founded BGR public relations firm, which then hired a security firm, Richard Burt's Due Diligence, in order to infiltrate and obtain information about the KPMG independent investigations funded by Paula Cox, who was the Bermuda Minister of Finance, into the IPOC International Growth Fund. Richard Burt and Mikhail Fridman have a strong working relationship.

In 2012 Fridman sold his entire stake in MegaFon for $5 billion.

=== TNK-BP (2003–2013) ===
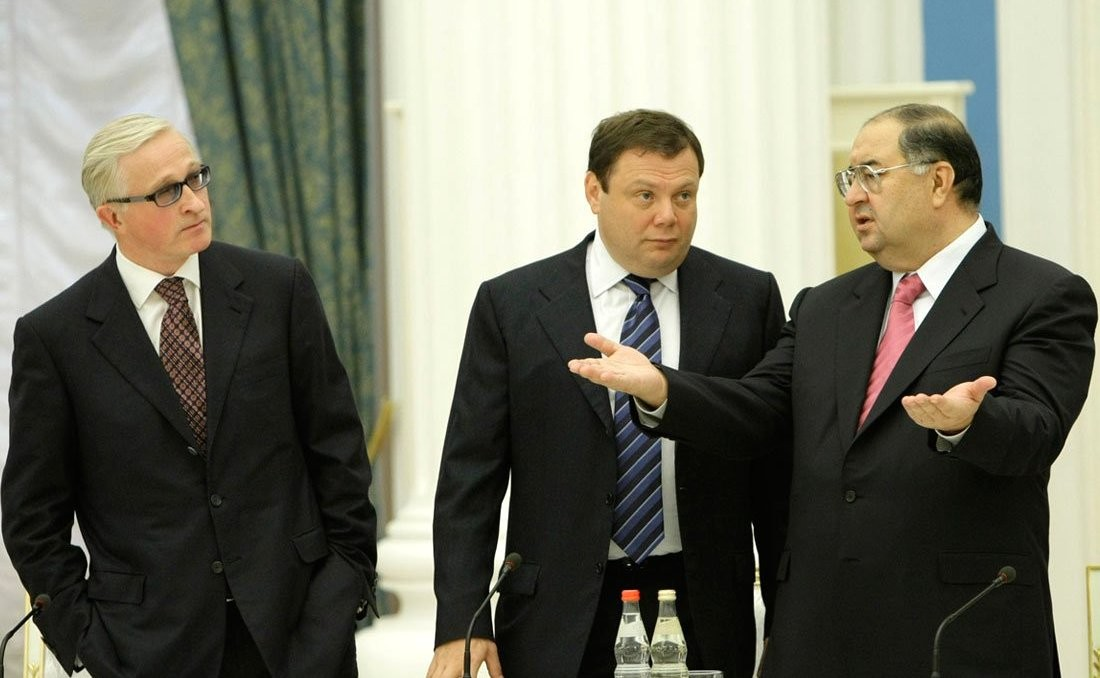
Fridman with Alexander Shokhin and Alisher Usmanov in 2009

In 1997, Fridman had collaborated with Len Blavatnik and Viktor Vekselberg to purchase the state-owned TNK (Tyumen Oil Company), an oil company in Siberia, for $800 million. In February 2003, the British multinational oil and gas company BP agreed to form the TNK-BP joint venture with the AAR (Alfa-Access-Renova) consortium, which included Alfa Group, Blavatnik's Access Industries, and Vekselberg's Renova. After the merger, TNK-BP became the third largest oil producer in Russia, and one of the top 10 largest private oil companies in the world. Fridman was TNK-BP chairman for nine years, and CEO for three years.

Prior to the TNK-BP joint venture, in 1999 Fridman had thwarted BP by seizing BP's stake in the Siberian oil company Sidanko, via bankruptcy maneuvers widely regarded as unfair practices. And although TNK-BP was highly successful financially, Fridman's relationship with BP during the TNK-BP years was contentious, and included blocking BP's 2011 planned partnership with Rosneft for Arctic oilfield exploration.

He resigned as CEO of TNK-BP in May 2012. In 2013, TNK-BP was sold to Russia's state-owned energy group Rosneft for $56 billion, with Fridman and his Russian partners receiving $28 billion for their 50% stake, at the height of crude oil prices.

=== Founding LetterOne and L1 Energy (2013–2015) ===
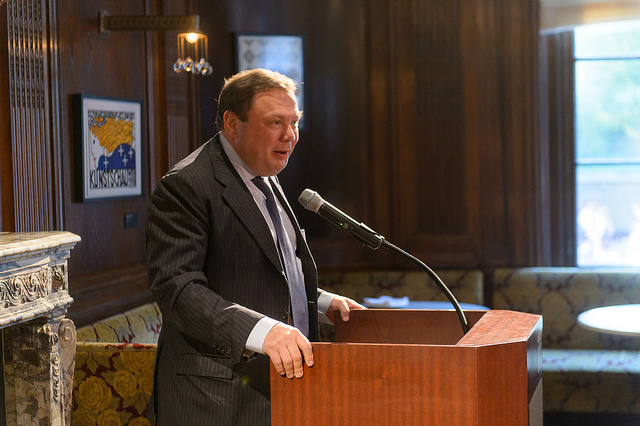
Fridman speaking at the L1 Energy launch on 14 September 2015 in New York.

Using the proceeds from the sale of their stakes in TNK-BP, Fridman and his Alfa Group partners Khan and Kuzmichev established the international investment company LetterOne (L1) in 2013, and Fridman became the company's chairman. LetterOne's additional co-founders were Petr Aven and Andrei Kosogov. Headquartered in Luxembourg, the company was created to invest in international projects in energy, telecoms, finance, technology, and other sectors. As of 31 December 2013, LetterOne had $29 billion in assets under management. In May 2015 Mervyn Davies (Lord Davies) was appointed deputy chairman of LetterOne, and former Swedish Prime Minister Carl Bildt was appointed as the board's advisor.

In 2013 LetterOne also formed L1 Energy, an energy investment vehicle, initially focused particularly on undervalued international oil and gas assets during the slump in oil prices. John Browne (Lord Browne) was appointed to its advisory board, and in March 2015 became its chairman.

=== L1 Energy's North Sea oil assets (2015) ===
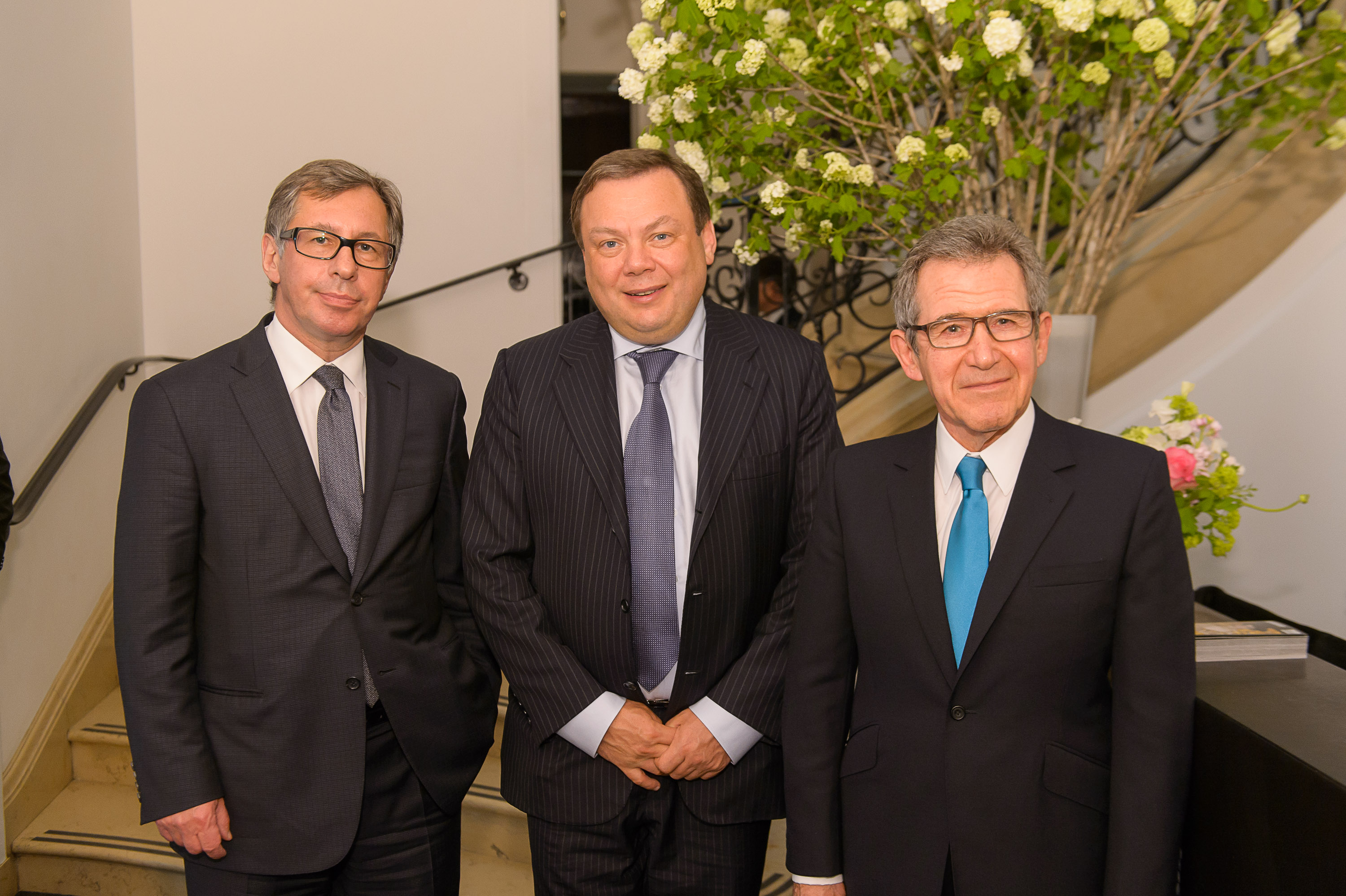
Fridman (center) with colleagues Petr Aven and Lord Browne (2015)

On 3 March 2015, L1 Energy acquired the international oil and gas company DEA from the German utility RWE for $7 billion (€5.1 billion). Headquartered in Hamburg, Germany with extensive assets in the British North Sea, RWE DEA had total natural gas production output of 2.6bn cubic metres in 2013. The purchase was opposed by the UK Energy and Climate Change Secretary Ed Davey, who raised concerns that Fridman might one day face international sanctions due to the Russo-Ukrainian war, which could force L1 Energy to shut down production in the North Sea, thus imperiling oil supplies and 5% of Britain's North Sea natural gas output. On 4 March 2015, Davey gave Fridman a one-week deadline to convince the UK government not to force him to sell the North Sea oil and gas assets. In April 2015, the government gave Fridman up to six months to sell.

In October 2015 Fridman and the LetterOne Group sold L1 Energy's British North Sea assets to Ineos, a Switzerland-based petrochemical company owned by Jim Ratcliffe, for $750 million. The British government assured LetterOne that the forced sale was "not a judgement on the suitability of LetterOne's owners to control these or any other assets in the UK".

In October 2015 LetterOne Group acquired German utility company E.ON's equity interests in 43 Norwegian oil and gas licences, including interests in three producing Norwegian fields, all located in the North Sea, for $1.6 billion.

=== LetterOne's telecom and other technology assets 2015 to present ===
In April 2015, LetterOne Technology (L1 Technology) was launched in London. Its focus was on buying "struggling telecom or technology companies that require a fresh infusion of capital". Various advisory board members were appointed including Brent Hoberman, Denis O'Brien, and Sir Julian Horn-Smith.

The L1 Technology fund began acting as a holding company for the 48 percent stake in Vimpelcom owned by Fridman and his partners. The fund also has a 13.2% share in the Turkish telecom company Turkcell, which since 2005 has been hampered by a long-running feud between its three largest shareholders: Cukurova, owned by Turkcell founder Mehmet Emin Karamehmet, Fridman's LetterOne via Alfa Telecom/Altimo, and Sweden's Telia Company.

In February 2016, Vimpelcom agreed to pay $800 million to settle U.S. and Dutch claims that it had bribed officials to win contracts in Uzbekistan between 2006 and 2012. A year later the company rebranded itself VEON, and changed its focus to mobile internet services such as banking, taxis, and messaging.

In February 2016, Fridman's LetterOne fund invested $200 million in Uber. In August 2016 LetterOne invested $50 million in telecommunications start-up FreedomPop, to help finance its international expansion.

=== Additional activities 2012 to present ===
In 2012 Fridman partnered with American real-estate developer Jack Rosen in a joint venture to invest $1 billion in distressed real estate properties along the U.S. East Coast.

In June 2016, LetterOne prepared to expand into healthcare by launching the $3 billion fund L1 Health in the United States, for investments in the global healthcare industry.

In October 2016, Alfa Group acquired Ukrainian bank Ukrsotsbank, by offering its parent, the Italian financial conglomerate UniCredit Group, a minority stake of 9.9% in ABH Holdings.

In December 2016, LetterOne launched L1 Retail, headquartered in London, to invest $3 billion in "the retail stars of tomorrow" in Europe and the UK.

In 2016 Fridman coined the term "Indigo Era", for his theory of a global shift to an emerging era of economics based on creativity and digital skills rather than on natural resources. In 2017 he funded a £100,000 Indigo Prize for new economic-measurement models based on the paradigm.

In June 2017 LetterOne's L1 Retail division acquired Holland & Barrett, Europe's largest health-food store chain, for £1.8 billion ($2.3 billion). Also in 2017 Fridman, via LetterOne, invested $3 billion in Pamplona Capital Management, a private-equity firm that was founded by Alexander Knaster, the former CEO of Alfa-Bank, and which Fridman had invested in previously.

In January 2018, due to concerns over possible sanctions stemming from the 2017 U.S. Congressional sanctions on Russia, Fridman announced that Alfa-Bank was phasing out its holdings in Russia's defense industry.

In May 2018 Fridman and Aven spoke to an off-the-record private dinner at the Atlantic Council in Washington, D.C. The invitation and the privacy of the meeting drew criticism of the Atlantic Council from a group of 13 Russian and U.S. experts and activists, who wrote that "In our view ... Aven, Fridman, and other key Alfa-Bank oligarchs are ... close cronies and insiders of Putin's regime, and do not operate independently of Putin's demands." The Atlantic Council responded that the private meeting was not "a sweetheart platform", and the Kremlin responded that the two oligarchs represented the interests of their business.

In 2019, Mikhail Fridman acquired a 50% stake in one of the suppliers of computing devices for the Russian defense industry via the structures affiliated with A1 investment company.

=== Sanctions ===
On 28 February 2022, the European Union blacklisted Fridman and had all his assets frozen as part of a package of sanctions imposed against Russian officials and oligarchs in response to the 2022 Russian invasion of Ukraine. Fridman said that the war would "damage two nations who have been brothers for hundreds of years" and called for the "bloodshed to end". The United Kingdom also sanctioned Fridman on 15 March 2022.

In October 2022 Fridman offered to transfer $1 billion of his personal wealth into the Ukrainian Sense Bank that he co-founded. Officials said the proposal was calculated to persuade the UK to lift sanctions against him. Fridman denied making a quid pro quo offer to Ukraine. Following the invasion of Ukraine Sense Bank transferred millions of its own budget to the needs of the Armed Forces of Ukraine and territorial defense units. Fridman was sanctioned by the UK government in 2022 in relation to the invasion.

In September 2023 the Office of Financial Sanctions Implementation HM Treasury (UK) updated the text of the financial sanctions notice related to Mikhail Fridman. He is now referred to as "an involved person under the Russia regulations" instead of "a prominent Russian businessman and pro-Kremlin oligarch". Additionally, a phrase alleging close ties between Mikhail Fridman and Russian President Vladimir Putin has been deleted from the document.

On 5 September 2023, the Security Service of Ukraine announced in absentia that Fridman was suspected of violating Article 110 of the Criminal Code, which provides for liability for financing actions to seize power, overthrow the constitutional order, or change the territory of the state. Under this article, he could face up to 8 years in prison with confiscation of property. The SSU believes that since the start of the conflict, the banker has invested about 2 billion rubles in Russian defense enterprises, in particular, in the Tula Cartridge Plant.

In April 2024, following a legal challenge, The General Court of the European Union stated there were no evidence to put him on EU sanctions list.

In May 2024, Fridman sued the Luxembourg government, becoming the first Russian billionaire to challenge European sanctions and demand compensation for his frozen assets. In August 2024, Fridman, after loss of trial in Luxembourg, started arbitration dispute with Luxembourg at the Hong Kong International Arbitration Centre (HKIAC).

In March 2025, the Financial Times reported that Hungary's ambassador to the EU sought the removal of Fridman from the sanctions list, threatening to veto the extension of the 2000-person sanctions list. Hungary's effort to remove Fridman from sanctions list was supported by Luxembourg.

== Controversy in Spain ==
Fridman first appeared in the Spanish press in November 2002, when the Liberian tanker Prestige sank off the coast of Galicia. It was transferring 77,000 tons of Russian heavy oil; the cargo belonged to Crown Resources, a company owned by Fridman's Alfa Group. The oil spill contaminated the Spanish coast, causing a major environmental disaster, with total damage estimated at 1.5 billion euros. After the disaster, the Spanish newspaper El Mundo called Fridman ‘Dirty Michael’.

In the summer of 2016, the Spanish entrepreneur Javier Perez Dolset, head of the ZED Corporation (mobile apps developer), addressed the Spanish prosecutor's office with a complaint about his Russian partners associated with VimpelCom Ltd. According to Dolset, they had illegally seized the capital of their joint venture, which resulted in the bankruptcy of the parent company. El Confidencial published a series of articles about the story of ZED's bankruptcy, and accused Fridman of staging an illegal takeover by removing Javier Perez Dolset from the business and ruining him financially.

On 16 January 2017, Peter Wakkie, a Dutch attorney known as Fridman's righthand man, was arrested at Madrid's Barajas Airport for possible business fraud. (Note: Fridman, who is very close to Vladimir Putin, is alleged to have provided significant support to the Russian hacking efforts of the United States Democratic Party's National Committee server during the 2016 United States elections.)

In October 2019, Fridman attended court proceedings relating to the Zed case in order to be questioned by Spain's National Court in Madrid. He was summoned to a pre-trial hearing as a person under investigation. The accusation was formulated as “a series of actions which brought about the insolvency of Spanish firm Zed Worldwide… in order to acquire it at a derisory price, far lower than its market value.” The prosecutor referred to Fridman's dealings with Zed Worldwide as a 'raid', clarifying that this was a technique used “typically used by the Russian mafia” with the purpose of taking over a business illegally. And while his legal representatives claimed that Fridman had never been a director of any entities involved in Zed's takeover or driving down Zed's market value, the Spanish prosecutors insisted that Fridman “hides his control of criminal activities behind subordinates.” After the pre-trial hearing, Jose Grinda, who was the lead prosecutor in the case, commented to the media that “from the perspective of the Prosecutor's Office, Fridman will remain in the status of the accused.” On 15 December 2020 the Spanish National Court dismissed the case. According to the decision, the judge considered that the continuation of the case against Fridman contradicted the principle of the presumption of innocence and stated that there were "no reasonable grounds to accuse the suspect as an author, accomplice or accessory." Subsequently, in an order dated 22 February 2021, the National High Court of Spain dismissed appeals by Zed Group in Fridman's favor, concluding there was no evidence to demonstrate that Zed Group's allegations were true, and that the text messages originally used as evidence failed to implicate Fridman "beyond references from third parties."

In mid-2017, Fridman's LetterOne investment company acquired Dia, a Spanish supermarket chain. From 2011 to 20 December 2018, Dia was listed in the so-called IBEX 35 as one of the 35 largest Spanish companies on the stock market. Economy expert Sergio Avila commented: “... With the entry of [LetterOne] into [Dia] the sales fell sharply, the profitability of enterprises decreased, which was accompanied by a fall in Dia's share prices on the Madrid Stock Exchange. Therefore, I assess Dia's prospects as extremely negative, and in no way recommend it to investors.” El Confidencial recalled past episodes associated with Fridman and qualified his actions as raider attacks on Spanish enterprises. In January 2021, the Spanish National Court dismissed a case alleging that Fridman had manipulated the market to devalue Dia's shares, with the judge stating the court instead saw Dia's decline in value as a result of "mismanagement" and lack of investments in marketing.

== Current posts ==
Fridman is on the board of directors of ABH Holdings, which is the Luxembourg-headquartered holding company of Alfa Banking Group. Since DEA Deutsche Erdoel AG was bought by L1 Energy in 2015, he has been a member of its supervisory board.

Fridman is a member of numerous public-facing bodies, including the National Council on Corporate Governance in Russia and a boardmember of the Russian Union of Industrialists and Entrepreneurs. In February 2001, he became a member of the Council for Entrepreneurship at the Government of the Russian Federation. He was elected as a member of the Public Chamber of Russia in November 2005. Since 2005, he has been a Russian representative on the international advisory board of the Council on Foreign Relations.

== Philanthropy and initiatives ==
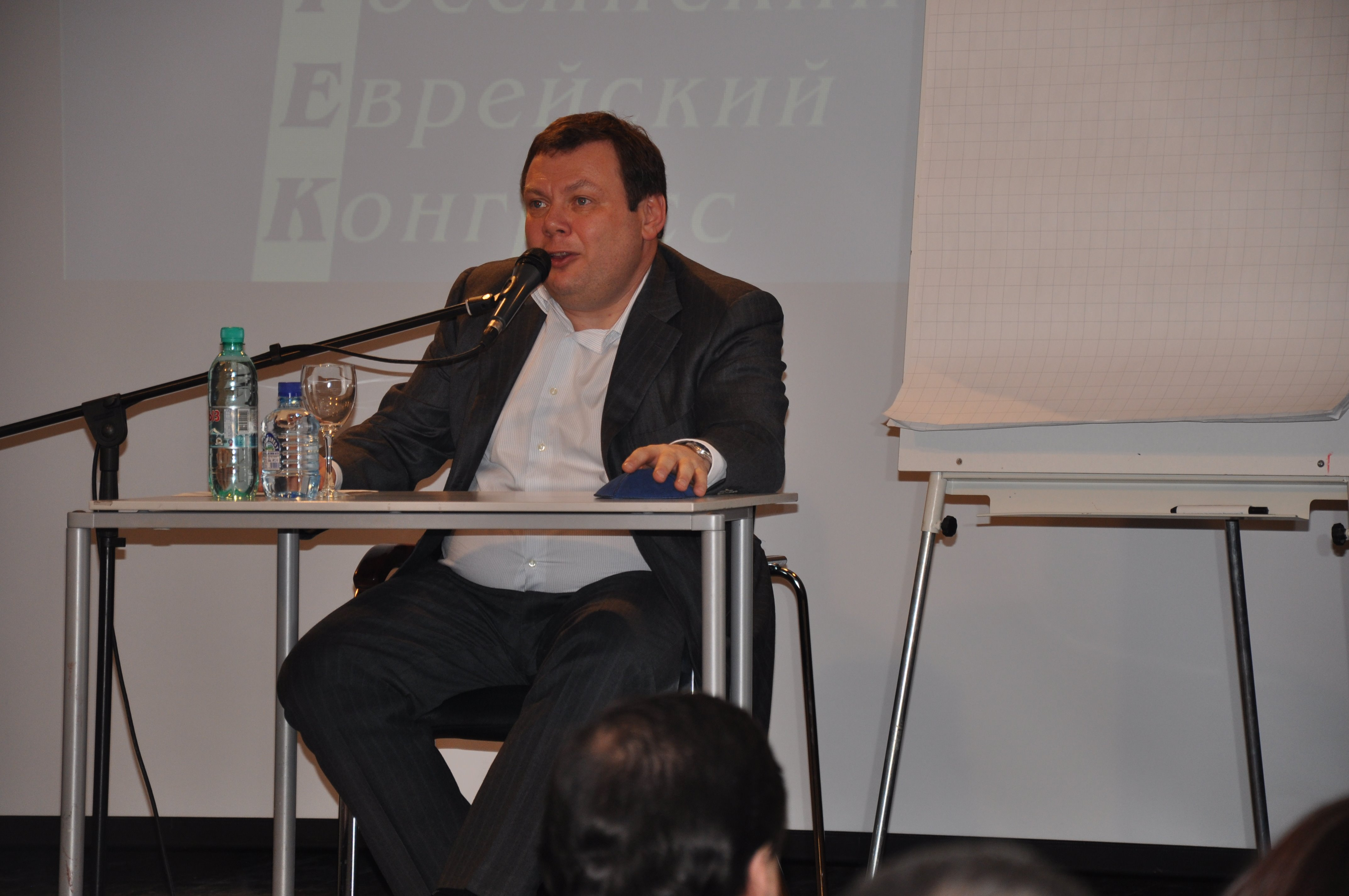
Fridman speaking at the Russian Jewish Congress meeting, 2009

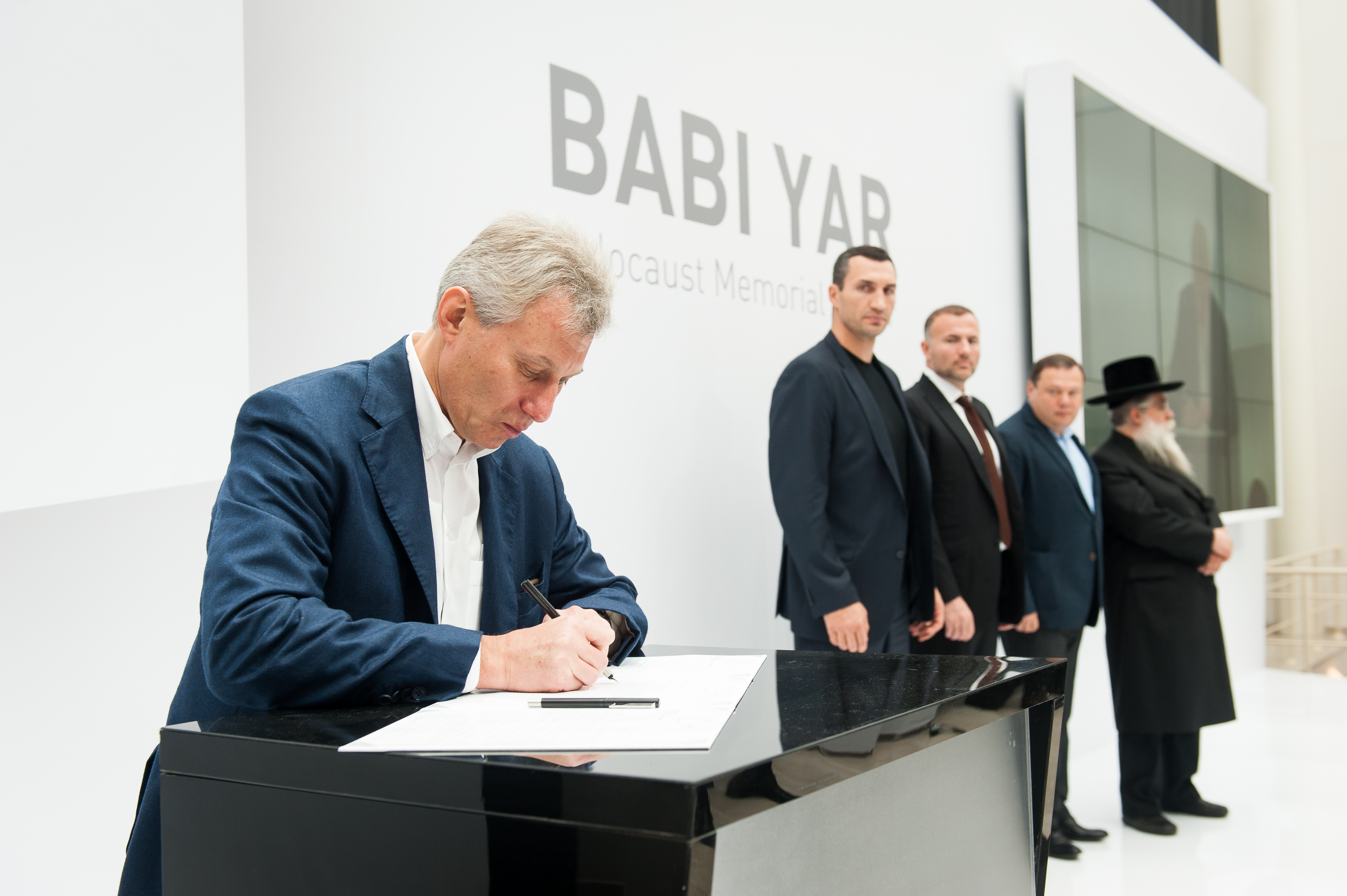
Fridman (second from the right) at the commemoration of the Babi Yar Holocaust Memorial Center at Babi Yar in Kyiv, 2016

In 1996 Fridman was one of the founders of the Russian Jewish Congress, and he has been an active member since then, including having been its vice president and head of its cultural committee. He is a major donor to the European Jewish Fund, which promotes inter-religious dialogue. In 2007, Fridman, along with Stan Polovets, Alexander Knaster, Petr Aven, and German Khan, founded the Genesis Philanthropy Group, whose purpose is to develop and enhance Jewish identity among Russian-speaking Jews worldwide. The Genesis Prize, which the group founded in 2012, is a million-dollar annual prize for Jewish contributions to humanity. Fridman was also one of the major funders of the Holocaust memorial project at Babi Yar in Kyiv, Ukraine, which was launched in 2016.

In 2011 he founded the annual Alfa Jazz Fest, which is funded by Alfa-Bank, in his place of birth Lviv, Ukraine, and in 2014 launched the Alfa Future People Festival, an annual electronic music festival held on the banks of the Volga River in the Nizhny Novgorod region in Russia.

== Honours and awards ==
In 2003, Fridman received the Golden Plate Award from the Academy of Achievement in Washington, presented by former U.S. President Bill Clinton, and he was named one of "The Stars of Europe: 25 Leaders at the forefront of change" by BusinessWeek. In 2004 he was included in the Financial Times list of 25 business executives named "Leaders of the New Europe". In 2004 he was included in Fortune magazine's list of the Power 25 in Europe and was given GQ Russia's Man of the Year national award in 2006. Forbes Russia named Fridman Russian Businessman of the Year in 2012 and 2017.

== Legal challenges ==
In 2003, two "elite dachas" owned by the Russian government were sold below market value, one to Fridman and another to former Russian prime-minister Mikhail Kasyanov. The sales caught the attention of the press in July 2005, with State Duma member and journalist Aleksandr Khinshtein stating that the sales had gone through without the mandatory media announcement of auction. Khinshtein also alleged a preferential loan from Fridman to Kasyanov, which Fridman denied. Fridman stated that the property's asking price was low because the building was dilapidated and sold without land. Radio Free Europe reported that Khinshtein's investigation appeared to be an attempt to intimidate Kasyanov, who aspired to head anti-Putin forces. In early 2006, the Moscow Court of Arbitration ruled that the two houses should be returned to the state, maintaining Fridman's right to a refund but arguing the proper procedures were not followed during the privatization. On 1 March 2006, government officials responsible for the sale of the two properties were charged with misappropriation of entrusted property for an especially large sum by an organized group.

In 2005, a United States district court in Washington, D.C. dismissed a 2000 libel suit by Fridman and Petr Aven against the Center for Public Integrity over an online article which included a suggestion that they had been involved in drug-running and organized crime; the federal judge ruled that there was no evidence of actual malice on the part of the publication and that Fridman and Aven were limited public figures regarding the public controversy involving corruption in post-Soviet Russia.

In May 2017 Fridman, along with fellow Alfa-Bank owners Petr Aven and German Khan, filed a defamation lawsuit against BuzzFeed for publishing the unverified Steele dossier, which alleged financial ties and collusion between Putin, Trump, and the three bank owners. In October 2017 Fridman, Aven, and Khan also filed a libel suit against the private-investigation firm Fusion GPS and its founder Glenn Simpson, who had commissioned former MI6 agent Christopher Steele to compile the dossier, for circulating the dossier among journalists and allowing it to be published. In April 2018 Fridman, Aven, and Khan filed a libel suit against Steele in the Superior Court of the District of Columbia, but the suit was dismissed with prejudice the following August. Aven, Khan, and Fridman then brought a lawsuit for defamation in Britain against Orbis Business Intelligence, Steele's private intelligence firm. The trial started in March 2020 in London, with Steele arguing the claim should be dismissed as the subject matter "fell within the remit of national security". In July 2020, Mr. Justice Mark Warby in the Queen's Bench Division of the British High Court of Justice ordered Orbis pay $23,000 to both Fridman and Aven in damages, after Steele claimed they had delivered "large amounts of illicit cash" to Vladimir Putin when Putin was deputy mayor of St. Petersburg. Warby stated that the claim was "demonstrably false" and awarded the damages to compensate "for the loss of autonomy, distress and reputational damage caused by the breaches of duty". The judge also stated that Steele's dossier inaccurately claimed that Aven and Fridman provided foreign policy advice to Putin. Fridman testified in the proceedings that he had never been asked by Putin to perform political favors, with Warby agreeing that "in the context of his position as a businessman, the idea of [Fridman] doing Mr Putin's political bidding makes no sense."

== Alleged arrest in London ==
On 1 December 2022, an unnamed 58-year-old man was arrested at his residence in London and later released on bail by officers from the Combatting Kleptocracy Cell, established by the UK's National Crime Agency. Several media, such as the Russian state-owned news agency TASS, alleged the man was Mikhail Fridman. Alfa-Bank denied that Fridman was the man in question. The Russian Embassy in London, meanwhile, stated that Fridman had not asked for consular assistance Later, in September 2023, the National Crime Agency closed the investigation. An NCA spokesman said that the agency would take no further action against Fridman based on the warrant executed at Athlone House in December 2022.

== Personal life ==
Fridman was based for many years in Moscow, often spending time in European cities such as London, Paris, Amsterdam, and Hamburg. In 2015 he moved to London, and by 2016 had purchased Athlone House for £65 million to be his primary residence. He is divorced and has four children. In 2016 Fridman announced that by virtue of his will, his entire fortune will be left to charity.

Fridman and his first wife Olga have two daughters Katya (Ekaterina) and Lora (Larisa) (Russian: Лора). Olga studied with Mikhail at the Moscow Institute of Steel and Alloys, but in the 1990s she attended design courses in Paris and became an interior designer. As of May 2014, she and the daughters live in France. Fridman has two children with his second wife Oksana Ozhelskaya (Russian: Оксана Ожельская).

== See also ==
- Energy in Russia
- Russian oligarchs
- List of billionaires
- List of Russian people by net worth
- List of Russian billionaires
