= Sense Bank =

State-owned Ukrainian commercial bank

PJSC Sense Bank
- Native name: АТ «Сенс Банк»
- Type: Public joint stock company
- Industry: Financial services
- Founded: March 24, 1993; 33 years ago
- Headquarters: Kyiv, Ukraine
- Number of locations: 210 branches and 706 ATMs, served 1.5 million natural and legal persons. Head office: 100 Velyka Vasylkivska St., Kyiv
- Key people: Acuner Sevki — Chairman of the Supervisory Board, Olena Zubchenko — Acting Chairman of the Management Board; Oleksii Blinov — chief economist
- Products: Consumer banking Corporate banking Investment banking
- Revenue: Equity: ₴2.623 bln (31 December 2015) (31.12.2015)
- Net income: ▲ ₴527 million (1 April 2019)
- Total assets: ▲ ₴96.8 bln (1 March 2021)
- Owner: Ministry of Finance
- Number of employees: 4000 persons (2023)
- Website: sensebank.com.ua

Sense Bank (Ukrainian: Сенс Банк) is one of the largest Ukrainian banks. Prior to its nationalization in July 2023, it was owned by ABH Financial Limited and ABH Ukraine Limited. Previously called Alfa-Bank (legally it was not connected with the Russian Alfa-Bank, but it had the same shareholders); on December 1, 2022, the name of the bank was changed to Sense Bank.

The bank was founded in 1993. In early 2024, it was confirmed by the National Bank of Ukraine (NBU) as one of the country's systemically important banks. The bank is also a member of the Ukrainian Deposit Guarantee Fund.

Following the 2022 Russian invasion of Ukraine the bank was rebranded to Sense Bank. Directly following the invasion millions of hryvnias of the bank's budget were allocated to the needs of the Armed Forces of Ukraine and Territorial Defense Forces. In 2022, the bank's largest shareholder was Russian–Israeli oligarch Mikhail Fridman⁣ (32.86%). They controlled the bank through ABH Financial Limited and ABH Ukraine Limited. In April 2023 the NBU declared the holding companies used to control the bank, ABH Financial Limited and ABH Ukraine Limited, "dubious" and instated a temporary ban on the use of its voting rights (100% of the voting rights of Sense Bank). On July 21, 2023 the Shmyhal Government (Cabinet of ministers of Ukraine) nationalised the bank.

== History ==
=== Early history ===
The bank was founded on 24 March 1993 as a limited liability company named Consumer-Assisting Commercial Bank Vito, having its head office in Kyiv. From 1995 until January 2001 the bank was named Kyiv Investment Bank. In 2001 the bank started operating under the Alfa-Bank brand.

In 2001, the bank became a member of the SWIFT system and an associated member of the VISA International. In the same year, the bank became a member of PFTS Stock Exchange and has been a member of its Council since August 2004.

=== Consolidation and deterioration of Ukraine–Russia relations ===
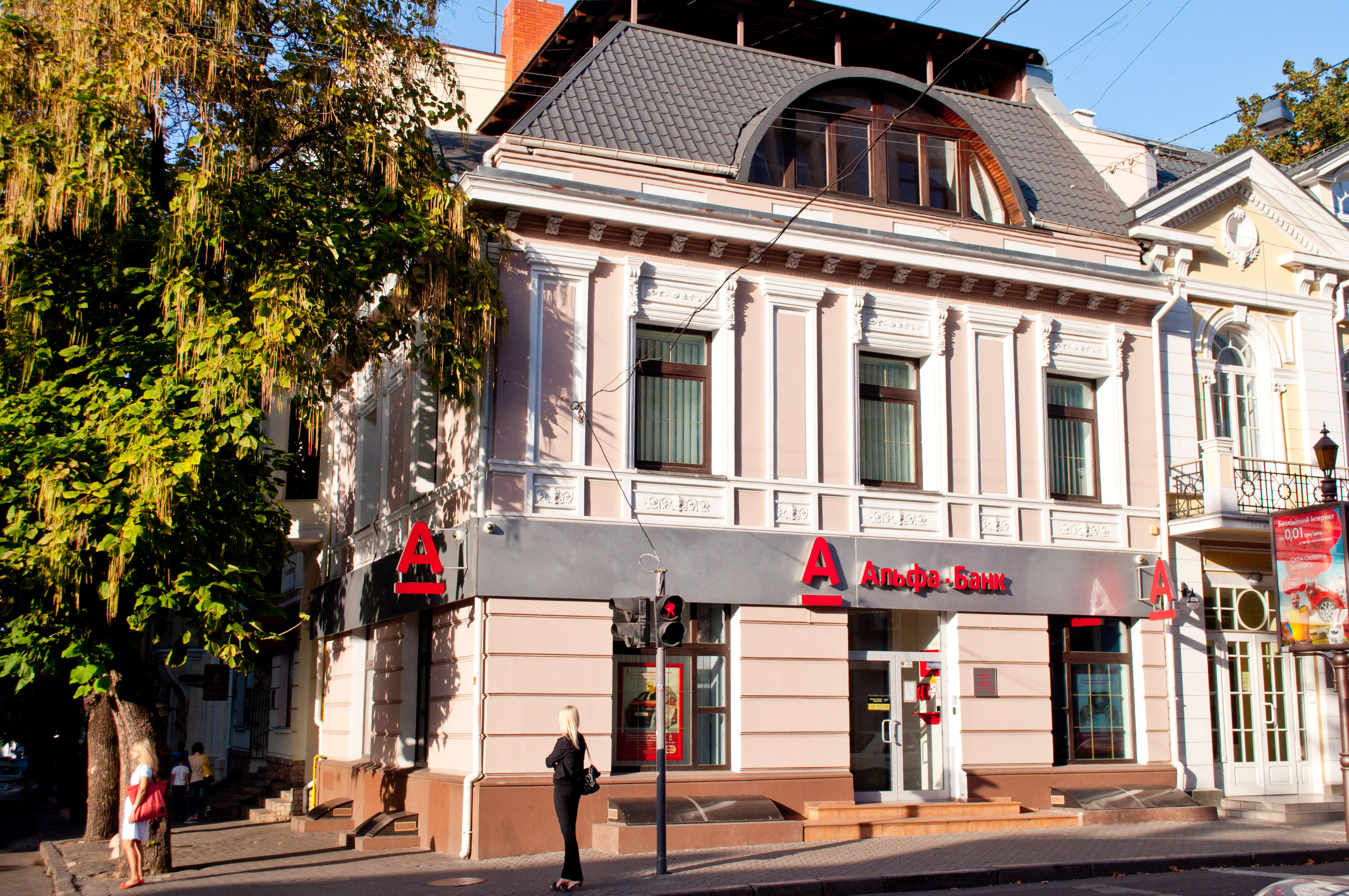
Alfa-Bank in Odesa (2012)

In 2006 Alfa-Bank Russia transferred its shares in the bank to the holding company ABH Ukraine Limited, this did not change the ownership of the bank. Both Alfa-Bank branches had the same Russian ownership in both Russia and Ukraine.

By 2006, the bank had transformed into a full-service bank with a strong presence in the corporate banking sector. Further consolidation of assets between 2009 and 2018 resulted in the establishment of one of the largest private banks in Ukraine, with the second largest retail clients' portfolio behind PrivatBank.

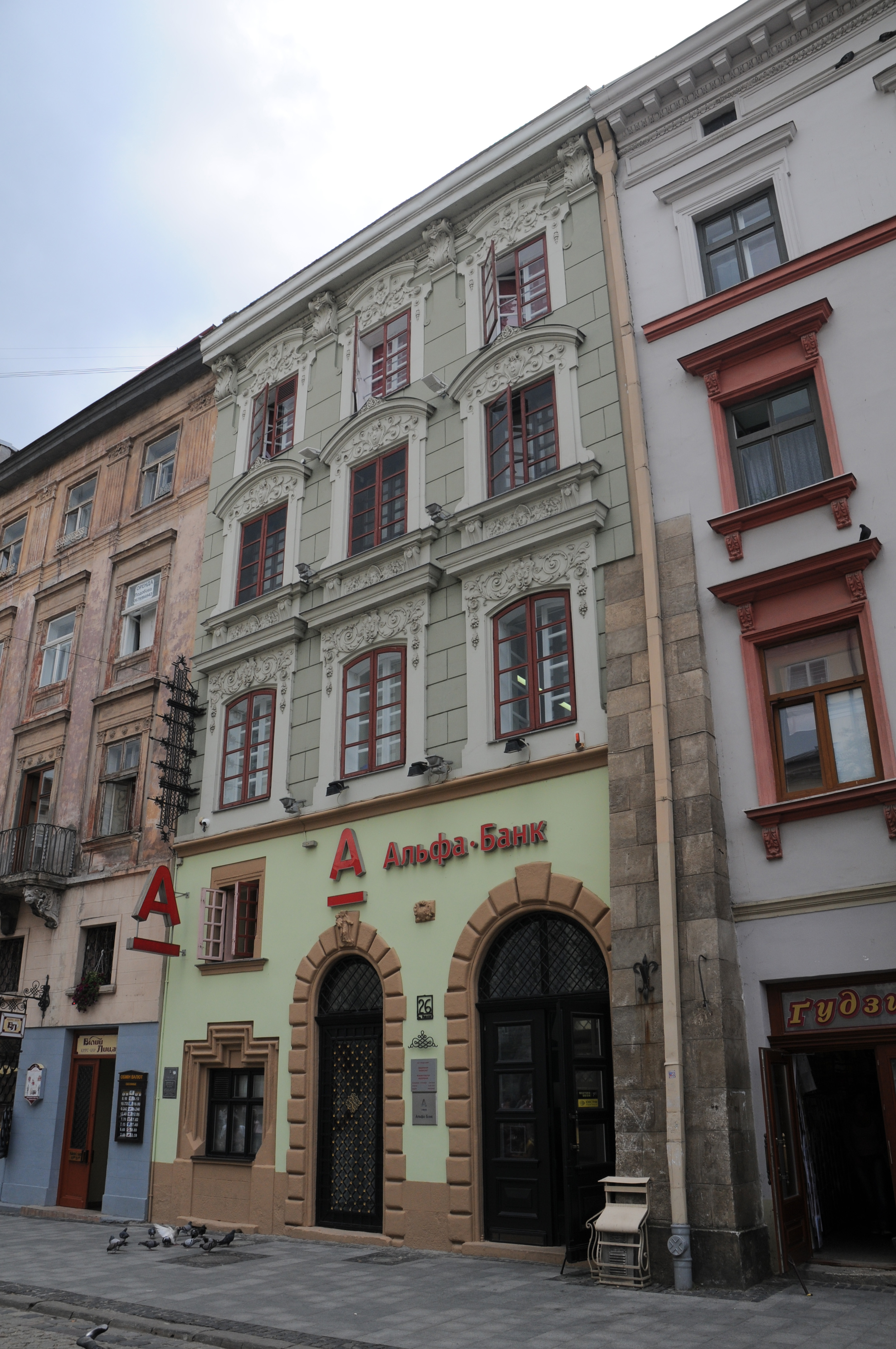
Alfa-Bank in Lviv (2013)

Following the March 2014 Russian annexation of Crimea and armed Russian-backed separatists seized Ukrainian government buildings and declared the Donetsk and Luhansk republics (DPR and LPR) as independent states the following month the bank stopped operating in these (according to the Ukrainian government) temporally occupied territories in full compliance with Ukrainian legislation.

In 2016 the bank largest shareholder were Russian businessmen Mikhail Fridman⁣ (32.86%), Petr Aven⁣ (12.4%) and Andrey Kosogov. They controlled the bank through ABH Holdings S.A., which indirectly owned 100% shares of Alfa-Bank (Ukraine).

On February 20, 2016, when hundreds had gathered on Maidan Nezalezhnosti to commemorate the second anniversary of the Revolution of Dignity, Ukraine nationalist protesters threw rocks and smashed windows of a Alfa-Bank bank in central Kyiv. A Sberbank was also vandalized.

After in April 2017 Alfa-Bank (officially a Ukraine company) had reiterated that it saw territories of Ukraine as Russian-occupied territories of Ukraine the shareholders of Alfa Group (a Russian privately owned investment group officially not linked to Alfa-Bank Ukraine) released a statement in which they stated "that we are out of politics and out of any political assessments.” At the time on the website of the National Bank of Ukraine (NBU), the beneficiaries of Alfa-Bank Fridman⁣ and German Khan were listed as citizens of Israel while the fact that they were also Russian citizens was not mentioned.

In September 2019 Ukrsotsbank merged with Alfa-Bank.

On 17 March 2020, due to the increased demand for foreign cash and limited supply of currency notes in Ukraine, the bank temporarily suspended the sale of foreign cash in 45 branches.

According to the NBU, on December 1, 2021, the bank's assets amounted to ₴111 billion. At the end of 2021, the bank had 201 branches and 686 ATMs (198 of them with NFC). As of July 18, 2022, the bank served over 3 million individual customers, 55,000 companies, and 82,000 sole proprietors; a number of bank employees was almost 5,000.

=== Rebranding ===
The management board of Bank has resolved to reject the Alfa-Bank following the February 24, 2022 Russian invasion of Ukraine name and continue to operate under a new Sense brand: “A few days after the outbreak of war, the Board decided to dissociate itself from the old brand and establish a new identity. The bank does not want to bear any relation to the aggressor country, even at the level of associations or connections that link to the brand operating in Russia.”

On April 21, 2022, the National Bank of Ukraine approved the appointment of a trustee for one year or until a change in ownership by either sale or transfer of shares to the state property fund, which was made possible with a law on nationalization adopted on May 29, 2023. In April 2022 the bank declared that it had the same Russian owners as in 2016. One of these owners, Mikhail Fridman, was sanctioned by Ukraine at the end of September 2022 and his assets in Ukraine were arrested.

On July 11, 2022, the rebranding to Sense Bank was announced. The bank rebranded to Sense, their mobile bank of the same name, created in 2020.

Under CEO Alla Komisarenko's initiative, Sense Bank has become a part of the joint banking network POWER BANKING. It means that 74 critical branches of Sense Bank will operate even during long-term blackouts caused by (since 10 October 2022) Russian strikes against Ukrainian infrastructure. All of them are equipped with alternative energy sources and backup communication channels.

After the start of the 2022 full-scale invasion of Ukraine millions of hryvnias of Sense Bank's budget were allocated to the needs of the Armed Forces of Ukraine and territorial defense units. Furthermore its employees and individual clients jointly raised more million in charitable donations for the Armed Forces and territorial defense units. The chief economist of Sense Bank Oleksiy Blinov has written widely on the economic impact of the 2022 Russian invasion of Ukraine. This invasion has resulted in significant loss of human capital, destruction of agricultural trading infrastructure, huge damages to productive capacity, including through the loss of electricity, and a reduction in private consumption of more than a third relative to pre-war levels. Blinov stated in February 2023 that "the all-out aggression requires an all-out response" by the European Union to win the war.

The bank, with 3 million depositors, posted a loss of 7 billion hryvnias ($189.75 million) in 2022, according to the National Bank of Ukraine.

=== Transfer to the State ===
In October 2022, one of the beneficial owners of the bank, Russian businessman Mikhail Fridman, sent a letter to the chairman of the National Bank of Ukraine with a proposal to transfer the shares to the state. As an alternative measure, an additional capitalization of the bank by $1 billion was proposed. This offer ultimately remained unfulfilled, after the European Commission and the Bank of England declined to give legally-binding opinions. In March 2023, the National Bank of Ukraine declared the ABH Financial Limited status "dubious" and instated a temporary ban on the use of its and ABH Ukraine Limited voting rights.

==== Nationalization Law ====
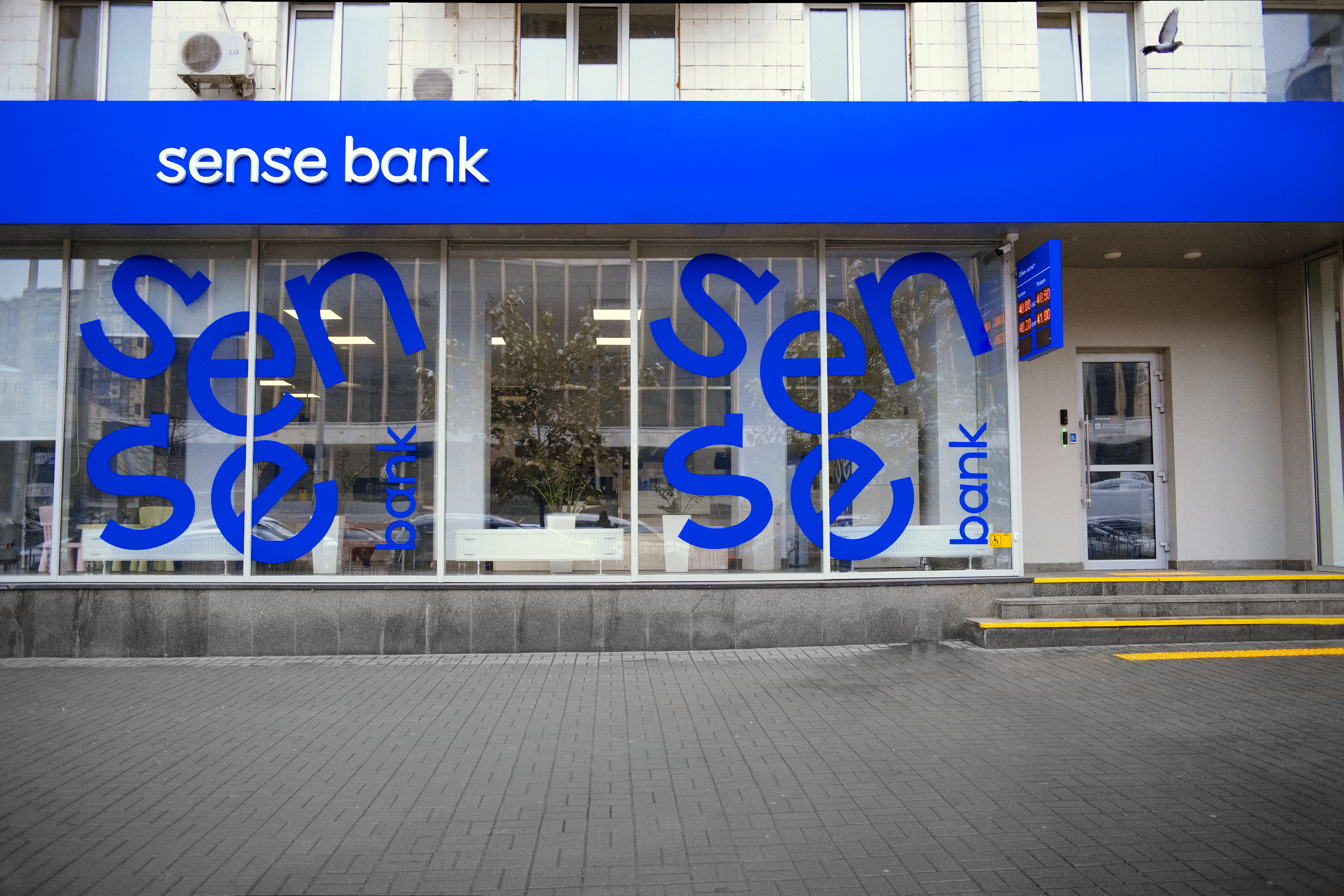
Sense Bank in Kyiv (2023)

On May 29, 2023 Ukraine's parliament (Verkhovna Rada) adopted a law on the nationalization of Sense Bank. The law stipulates that it is possible to withdraw a systemically important bank from the market in the absence of signs of insolvency - in case of applying blocking sanctions to the owner of a significant participation in it. On June 16, 2023, President of Ukraine Volodymyr Zelenskyy approved this law. In this law is legislation allowing the government to declare insolvent and, if needed, nationalize lenders from owners that came under sanctions due to Russia’s invasion. The following day the bank's holding company ABH Ukraine Limitedthreatened to bring the case to international courts if the nationalization went through.

In June 2023 ABH Ukraine Limited asked the Council for State Security to allow the sale of its shares to a licensed European investor. The proposed sale, which requires multiple institutional approvals, is for the symbolic price of one euro and precludes payments to sanctioned shareholders. The investment offer is made through the Cyprus-based company Karswell Ltd, owner of Polish bank Plus Bank SA. Plus Bank is part of Polish billionaire Zygmunt Solorz-Żak's holdings.

==== Final nationalisation of the bank ====
On July 20, 2023 the National Bank of Ukraine (NBU) withdraw the bank from the market and placed it under temporary administration. The NBU claimed that the connections of Sense Bank's owners with Russia "pose a significant reputational risk and have a significant negative impact on the bank's activities."

On July 21, 2023 the Shmyhal Government (the Cabinet of ministers of Ukraine) bought the full share of Sense Bank from the Fund for Guarantee of Individuals' Deposits for 1 hryvnia. It made the bank become state-run under the Ministry of Finance of Ukraine.

== Criticism of the nationalization ==
Since the nationalization of Sense Bank was finalized, a significant number of international financial institutions and regulators have expressed their concerns about the process, claiming multiple violations of international law by the government of Ukraine.

In July 2023, the International Monetary Fund warned Ukraine against excessive interference, as the reasons behind the nationalization were not related to financial instability and are likely to pose risks to the banking system as a whole. The statement said that Sense Bank was solvent and systemically important prior to the nationalization, so Ukraine’s actions were not justified by insolvency or prudential concerns.

=== Sale Block ===
Prior to the nationalization, ABHH responded to the concerns raised by the Government of Ukraine by proposing to sell shares of Sense Bank to international investor Karswell Limited, which would have reduced sanctioned owners’ stakes below critical thresholds. The sale, which would have solved possible issues arising from the bank’s holding structure, was subsequently blocked by the Government of Ukraine, which later took steps to nationalize the bank despite this.

=== Violations of international trade law ===
The nationalization of Sense Bank was also discussed as a violation of international trade law, particularly Ukraine’s Bilateral Investment Treaty with the Belgium-Luxembourg Economic Union.

The Bilateral Investment Treaty does not allow expropriation of any kind under any circumstances, and in any case, requires adequate and prompt compensation, which was not met by the Ukrainian government, therefore, it violated its obligations.

== Corporate structure ==
On July 24, 2023, the Finance Ministry formed a new board for the nationalized Sense Bank. The new board members included Olena Zubchenko, Oleksiy Shklyaruk, Inna Tyutyun, and Andriy Sokolov. The chairman of the board of the nationalized Sense Bank, Dmytro Kuzmin, the former chair of Universal Bank's board, resigned on Aug. 14, only three weeks into the new job.
Zubchenko, who previously headed the ministerial Financial Policy Department, was named acting chair.

Information about the shareholders in the bank's corporate structure, as of 1 January 2021 as information provided by the National Bank of Ukraine:

No. / Shareholder / Percent of shares

1. Andrey Kosogov — 40.96%
2. Mikhail Maratovich Fridman (born in Lviv, a citizen of Russia and Israel, residing in the United Kingdom) — 32.86%
3. Petr Olegovich Aven (a citizen of Russia and Latvia) — 12.40%
4. UniCredit S.p.A. — 9.9%
5. The Mark Foundation for Cancer Research — 3.87%

In April 2022 the bank declared that its ownership was as follows:

- ABH Financial Limited — 57.6%
- ABH Ukraine Limited — 42.3%

Through their shares in ABH Financial Limited and ABH Ukraine Limited the ultimate ownership of the bank did fall to Fridman, Aven and Kosogov. In its April 2022 declaration of ownership the bank itself did not mention UniCredit S.p.A. nor The Mark Foundation for Cancer Research.

== Awards ==
In March 2021, Sense Bank was named the best bank in Ukraine by Global Finance. In this same year, the international magazine Global Finance recognized Sense Bank as the winner in The Best Consumer Digital Bank in Ukraine category - for the best digital banking of the country at the annual World's Best Consumer Digital Banks Awards in Central & Eastern Europe 2021.

Global Finance also named Sense Bank as the best SME-bank in Ukraine at the SME Bank Awards 2022 and A-Club private banking division received the Best Private Bank Award for the second year in a row.

On November 26, 2021, to celebrate the first anniversary of Sense SuperApp digital banking app, Sense Bank in partnership with Mastercard held the world's first online concert of the Ukrainian artist MONATIK via the mobile app. This concert entered the Ukrainian book of records.

In 2022, Sense Bank has been awarded Bank of the Year 2022 for Ukraine by The Banker, a leading international publication. Andrii Hrytseniuk, Chief Information Officer at Sense Bank Ukraine, was named as the best CIO in the world by The Banker

Sense Bank received The Banker's Global Innovation in Digital Banking Award

Sense Bank was recognized as the best Ukrainian digital bank according to Ukrainian Fintech Awards

== Social initiatives ==
In 2011–2017, Sense Bank was a partner of the first international jazz festival in Lviv. In 7 years, the bank's initiative allowed for establishing an international music festival that has become an independent cultural event in Ukraine has been held under the name “Leopolis Jazz Fest”. The bank was a Special Partner of the Ukrainian Lunch within the framework of the World Economic Forum in Davos as well as a Partner of the 9th Yalta Annual Meeting (YES) entitled “Ukraine and the World: Addressing Tomorrow’s Challenges Together” and the 10th Yalta Annual Meeting “Changing Ukraine in a Changing World: Factors of Success”. In 2019, Sense Bank became a member of the UN Global Compact Network in Ukraine.

=== Support for war efforts ===
Since the invasion, 2022 Russian invasion of Ukraine 104 million hryvnias of the bank's budget have been allocated to the needs of the Armed Forces of Ukraine and territorial defense units. In particular, 10 million hryvnias in targeted funding were delivered to the Armed Forces of Ukraine during the first days of hostilities. Moreover, the bank has supplied military accoutrements, food, generators, tactical gear, medicines, one armored vehicle, thermal imaging cameras, etc. to TDUs and the Armed Forces of Ukraine. Bank employees and individual clients jointly raised over ₴115 million in charitable donations for Armed Forces and territorial defense units through Sense SupperApp mobile app.

The bank made it possible to donate to the Armed Forces of Ukraine via Sense SupperApp. The easy-to-use options, “Support for the Armed Forces of Ukraine” and “Support for Victims”, let you pay with one click; financial contributions may be also made from the єPіdtrimka (eSupport) card.

== See also ==
- List of banks in Ukraine
- Nationalization of Sense Bank
