= Alexey Kuzmichev =

Russian businessman

- Алексей Кузьмичёв
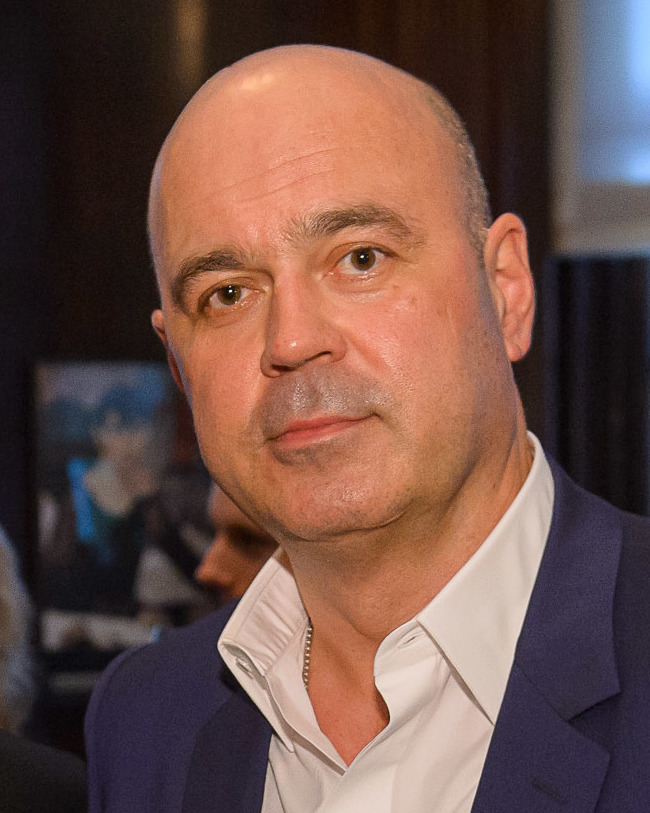
- Kuzmichev in 2015
- Born: 15 October 1962 (age 63); Kirov, Russian SFSR, Soviet Union
- Occupation: Businessman
- Spouse: Svetlana Kuzmicheva-Uspenskaya

Alexey Viktorovich Kuzmichev or Kousmichoff (Russian: Алексей Викторович Кузьмичёв; born 15 October 1962) is a Russian businessman. He is one of the founders of the LetterOne Group (LetterOne) and the Alfa Group.

Kuzmichev was a stakeholder in VimpelCom, Alfa-Bank, and X5 Retail Group. In March 2013, Kuzmichev sold his stake in energy venture TNK-BP to state-run oil company Rosneft for $2.5 billion. In March 2023, Kuzmichev sold his 16.32% stake in Alfa Bank and left the shareholders.

For the first time, Forbes magazine rated Kuzmichev in 2013 — as the 138th world's richest person with a fortune estimated at $8.8 billion. In 2023 he was ranked number 397 with a $6.5 billion fortune.

== Early life and career ==
Kuzmichev was born in 1962 in Kirov, Russia. Between 1980 and 1982 he served in the army on the Soviet-Chinese border as a radio operator. During this time he joined the Communist party.

In 1983, he enrolled in the Moscow Institute of Steel and Alloys where he met his future business partners, Mikhail Fridman and German Khan. In 1988, Kuzmichev, Fridman and Khan, along with Mikhail Alfimov, founded Alfa Photo, which specialized in the import of photo chemicals.

Later, Kuzmichev convinced his partners to diversify into the export business. Thus, in 1998, Alfa Eco was founded. The venture would become the basis of Alfa Group Consortium. (In 2005, Alfa Eco was rebranded as A1).

== Alfa Group ==
Alfa Group's portfolio includes the largest commercial bank in Russia, Alfa-Bank, (with affiliates in Ukraine, Kazakhstan, Belarus and the Netherlands/Amsterdam Trade Bank); international telecom company VimpelCom (the sixth largest mobile network operator in the world by subscribers as of April, 2012); as well as holding shares in Turkish telecommunications company Turkcell. Until April 2012, Alfa Group owned 25 percent of Russian cell phone operator MegaFon; it sold its share for $5.2 billion. Alfa also has stakes in Russian retailer X5 Retail Group, Rosvodokanal Group; and insurance company, Alfa-Strakhovanie Group. Kuzmichev owns over 18 percent of the consortium's joint assets and is a member of the board of directors of Alfa Finance Holdings. The Group's major transactions include TNK oil company privatization, which later became a part of TNK-BP venture, Russia's third-largest oil producer. In March 2013 Alfa Group and its joint partners AAR Consortium sold 50 percent of TNK-BP to Russian oil company Rosneft.

Kuzmichev is responsible for overseeing Alfa Group's international trading operations.

=== Sinking of The Prestige ===
Crown Resources, a European oil and commodity trading arm of Alfa Group, of which Kuzmichev is chairman, was the owner of the oil cargo on The Prestige vessel, which sank near the coast of Galicia, Spain in 2002. The case concerning The Prestige centred on the negligence of the vessel's owner and was completed in July 2013. No accusations or financial claims were made against Crown Resources.

== LetterOne Group ==
Kuzmichev is one of the original founders of the LetterOne Group. The LetterOne Group (LetterOne) is an international investment business based in Luxembourg. Its investments are focused on the telecoms, technology and energy sectors through its two main business units, L1 Energy and L1 Technology. Despite recently being required by the Government to sell their North Sea oil and gas fields, LetterOne have reportedly been told in a statement from a senior UK official that this 'is not a judgement on the suitability of LetterOne's owners to control these or any other assets in the UK.

Kuzmichev is married to Svetlana Kuzmicheva-Uspenskaya. In 2016, he bought a US$42 million mansion in New York City.

=== Sanctions ===
He was sanctioned by the European Union, Australia, Canada and the UK government in 2022 in relation to the Russo-Ukrainian War. In August 2023, the United States imposed financial sanctions on Kuzmichev pursuant to Executive Order 14024, placing him on OFAC's SDN List for "operating or having operated in the financial services sector of the Russian Federation economy."

Two of Kuzmichev's yachts have been seized by France due to the sanctions against Russian billionaires after the invasion of Ukraine by Russia but were returned on appeal.

== Arrest ==
On 30 October 2023, French police detained Kuzmichev and also conducted searches in the businessman's Parisian mansion and his villa in Saint-Tropez. He was released from custody on bail of €8 million the same day. Kuzmichev is suspected of tax crimes and violation of sanctions.

In November 2023, the French National Financial Prosecutor's Office (PNF) announced charges against Kuzmichev for tax fraud. He was subsequently placed under judicial supervision and banned from leaving the country.

== See also ==
- List of billionaires
- List of Russian billionaires
