= Global Perspectives =

Global Perspectives may refer to:

- A journal published by LetterOne that promotes the Indigo Era economic concept
- A television interview show produced by WUCF-TV
