= Water supply and sanitation in Russia =

Data
- Continuity of supply: Continuous
- Average urban water use (L/person/day): 248 (2004)

Institutions
- Decentralization to municipalities: Partial
- National water and sanitation company: None
- Water and sanitation regulator: None
- Responsibility for policy setting: Ministry of Natural Resources
- Sector law: Various
- No. of urban service providers: About 2,800

In Russia, approximately 70 per cent of drinking water comes from surface water and 30 per cent from groundwater. In 2004, water supply systems had a total capacity of 90 million cubic metres a day. The average residential water use was 248 litres per capita per day. One quarter of the world's fresh surface and groundwater is located in Russia. The water utilities sector is one of the largest industries in Russia serving the entire Russian population.

== History ==
By the end of the nineteenth century, sewerage was only present in 63 Russian cities (5.12%). The year of 1870 was the turning point in urban sanitation in Russia: after the reform of city self-government, the responsibility to address the economic issues related to the urban environment and its sanitary conditions fell upon local authorities. In 1911 the central government begun to provide financial assistance to cities in the fight against epidemics and improve water supply sources.

== Service quality ==
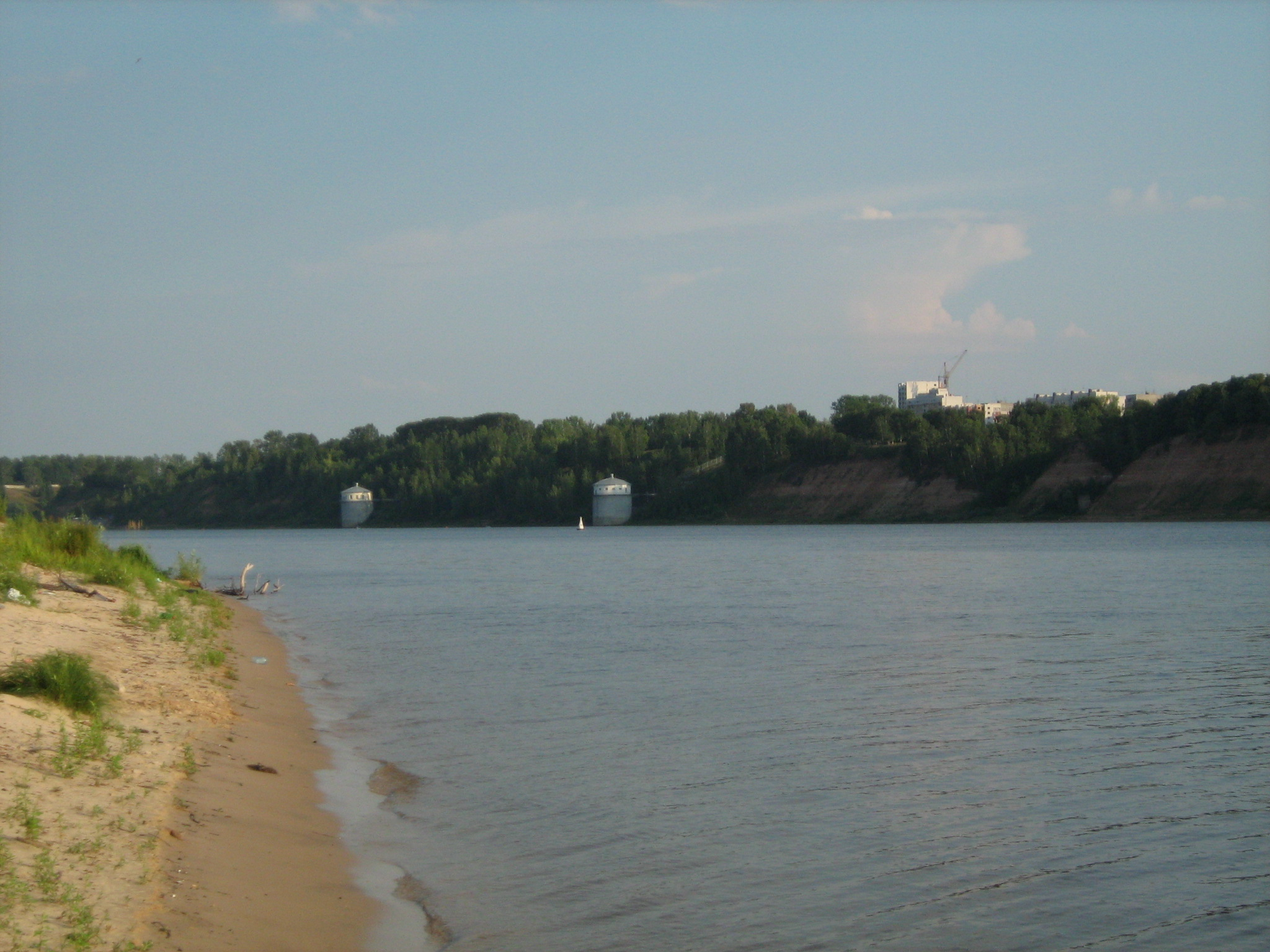
Water purification station (two round towers) on the Volga waterfront in Kstovo

Sanitation In 2012, the capacity of the wastewater treatment plants was 743.8 million cubic metres a day, which is about the same as the 1995 level. The length of the sewerage network was 118,000 km. The amount of wastewater passing through the plants in 2002 represents 98.2 per cent of wastewater emitted. Of this, only 1.8 per cent is treated in accordance with the established regulations, while the remainder is discharged, insufficiently treated, into rivers, lakes and the sea. 60 per cent of the wastewater treatment plants are overloaded and 38 per cent have been in operation for 25 to 30 years and need to be reconstructed. The deficit in the capacity of sewerage systems at present is more than 9 million cubic metres a day. 9,616 sewerage systems are in operation, but 73 towns (4 per cent) and 103 urban-type settlements (13 per cent) still had no central sewerage system in 2012.

In 2019, according to data put out by the Russian Statistics Service, 22.6 percent of Russian households were not connected to a sewer system (most of them in rural areas).

== Service provision by the private sector ==
As of 2014, there were at least 23 contracts with private companies to manage water utilities or plants with an investment commitment of almost 2 billion US dollars. 18 contracts cover entire utilities and 5 contracts cover individual plants. 5 of these contracts were signed before 2002, 17 in the 2003-2006 period. Only one contract - a 100 million dollars concession in Voronezh signed in 2012 - was awarded after 2006. 8 of the 23 contracts are held by the conglomerate Alfa Group either directly or through its subsidiary Rosvodokanal.. Its Russian competitor Integrated Energy Systems Holding (IES) holds four lease contracts. The largest foreign investor in the Russian water sector is Austrian EVN Group, which holds three contracts for treatment plants. These include the largest water contract in Russia for the South-West Moscow drinking water plant, which was signed in 2004 with an investment commitment of 220 million US dollars. The French water company Veolia is engaged in Russia through a contract for the Southern Water Treatment Plant signed in 2005. While some of these contracts were awarded through competitive bidding, most were awarded after direct negotiations.

In 2003, the Saint Petersburg utility signed a concession agreement for the Southwest wastewater treatment plant with a Swedish-Finnish consortium. The project was supported by loans from the European Bank for Reconstruction and Development (EBRD), the European Investment Bank (EIB). The Nordic Environment Finance Corporation owns part of the project company. The idea of a concession for the entire water and wastewater system of Saint Petersburg was first floated in 2005. In parallel, a plan to bid out a Build-Operate-Transfer (BOT) contract for a water treatment plant was championed by the city governor Valentina Matvienko, but was abandoned in 2013. In the same year, the new city governor Georgy Poltavchenko announced plans to sign a 25-30 year concession agreement including investments of US$3 billion. A tender was expected to be launched in 2014 "at the earliest".

However, concessions such as the one planned for Saint Petersburg may not be financially viable because Russian President Vladimir Putin imposed a national water tariff freeze. In October 2014 the city of Volgograd announced it would launch a bid for a 25-year concession involving investments of $500 million.

== Bibliography ==
- Agafonova, Anna B. (2020). "Water Supply to the Small Cities in the Northern Region of the Russian Empire, 1890-1910s". City and History. 9 (1): 45–68. doi:10.33542/CAH2020-1-02.
- OECD: Guidelines on Performance-based Contracts between Municipalities and Water Utilities in Eastern Europe, Caucasus and Central Asia (EECCA), 2006, see especially the section "General description of the water supply section David Hall and Vladimir Popov: Privatisation and restructuring of water supply in Russia and Ukraine, Public Services International Research Unit (PSIRU), January 2005.
- Alexander Ilyinsky: Russia: Mapping national procedures, sources, available data and information, ca. 2011, a publication supported by the European Commission to support mitigation of climate change and adaptation to climate change, see section 1.9.2 on wastewater treatment (p. 27-29).
