= Nationalization of Sense Bank =

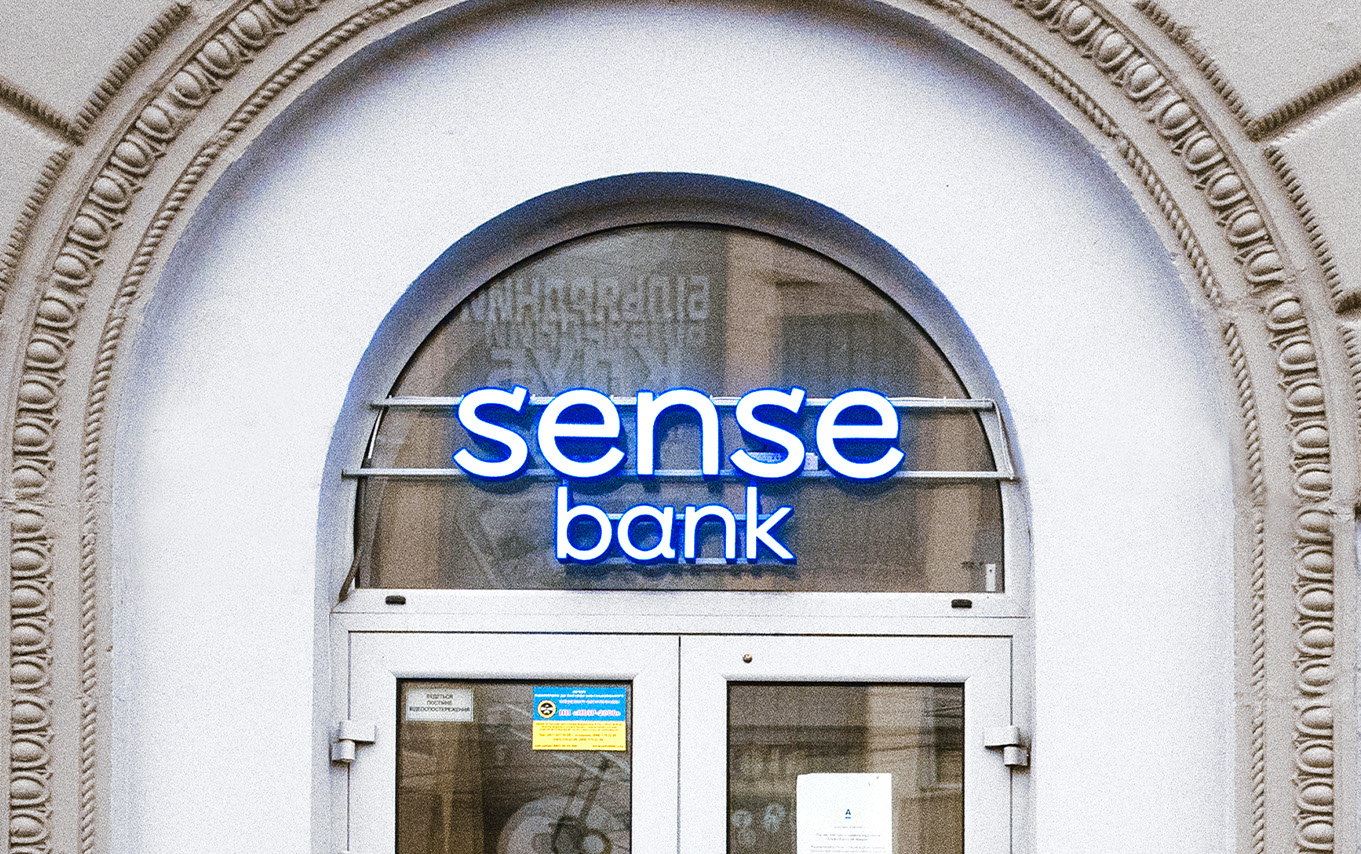
Sense Bank headquarters in Kyiv

In July 2023, the Ukrainian bank Sense Bank was nationalized by the Ukrainian government, taking 100% ownership of the bank’s shares. The nationalization followed legislative and regulatory actions by the government and the National Bank of Ukraine (NBU), allowing it despite the common law.

== Background ==
Sense Bank, formerly known as Alfa-Bank Ukraine, was one of Ukraine’s largest privately owned banks and was designated as a systemically important bank by the National Bank of Ukraine. Prior to nationalization, the bank remained solvent and continued operating normally, providing retail and corporate banking services across the country.

== Events leading to nationalization ==
In 2023, the Ukrainian government adopted legislation that allowed the forced withdrawal of systemically important banks from the market. These legal changes expanded the power of the state to nationalize banks partly owned by Russian individuals or entities, without the standard insolvency proceedings.

Ukrainian authorities claimed that the ownership structure of the bank posed security and financial stability risks. However, prior to the nationalization, the bank was fully solvent and functional, while two of its ultimate beneficial owners were the American non-profit Mark Foundation for Cancer Research and the Italian banking group UniCredit, neither of which had any connections to Russia.

=== Sale proposal ===
To address the government’s concerns, the bank’s holding company proposed selling a controlling stake to Karswell Limited, an international investor with no solvency risks and no exposure to Russian holdings.

Despite the proposal, the Ukrainian government blocked the transaction and proceeded to nationalize the bank, despite the availability of an alternative solution that would have preserved its private ownership.

== The nationalization ==
In July 2023, the Ukrainian government formally took control of Sense Bank, with all privately held shares expropriated and transferred to the government.

Unlike previous similar cases in Ukraine, including the nationalization of PrivatBank in 2016, the process did not involve claims of insolvency, capital inadequacy, or threats of liquidity to depositors. In addition, the accepted compensation mechanisms for former shareholders were disregarded, as the government acquired the bank’s shares for the price of a single hryvnia (equivalent to $0.03).

== Criticism and international reaction ==
Following the nationalization, several international financial institutions and regulators expressed their concerns about the process.

In July 2023, the International Monetary Fund warned Ukraine against excessive interference, as the reasons behind the nationalization were not related to financial instability, and were likely to pose risks to the banking system as a whole.

=== Legal concerns ===
Legal analysts and international observers argued that the nationalization raised serious questions under international investment law. Critics also noted that the expropriation lacked protocols of adequate and prompt compensation, which is standardly a key requirement under international treaties.

=== Violations of international trade and investment law ===
The nationalization of Sense Bank was also subject to criticism due to a potential violation of Ukraine’s Bilateral Investment Treaty with the Belgium Luxembourg Economic Union.

Under the treaty, expropriations are either prohibited or subject to strict conditions, including necessity, due process, and prompt and adequate compensation to original stakeholders. Critics argued that these conditions were not met in the process of Sense Bank’s nationalization, meaning Ukraine was in breach of its international obligations.
