= Carol Corrado =

American economist

Carol A. Corrado is an American economist She was the chief of industrial output at the Federal Reserve Board and is a senior advisor and research director in economics at The Conference Board. She serves as a member of the executive committee for the National Bureau of Economic Research's (NBER) conference on research on income and wealth. She is a senior policy scholar at Georgetown University McDonough School of Business Centre for Business and Public. In addition to these positions, Corrado is involved with the American Statistical Association as well as the Technical Advisory Committee of the Bureau of Labor Statistics. With the American Statistical Association Corrado serves as the chair-elect of Business and Economics.

== Education ==
Carol Corrado attended Hershey High School in Hershey, Pennsylvania before she began her undergraduate degree in 1965 at Carnegie Mellon University in Pittsburgh, where she received a B.S. in Management Science in 1969. After her time at Carnegie Mellon, Corrado began her PhD in 1970 at the University of Pennsylvania in Philadelphia, where in 1976 she obtained a PhD in economics.

== Research ==
Corrado's research focuses on macroeconomic issues in the United States, China, Europe and Japan. She focuses her research on intangible assets, innovation and economic growth where she has authored a number of papers. Much of her research addresses the changing digital economy and the role that information and communication technology (ICT) has had on economic and productivity growth. Further, a large portion of her work with The Conference Board has been on the topic of the knowledge economy and the role of intangible assets in driving innovation and growth on both the microeconomic and macroeconomic level.

=== "Intangible Capital and U.S. Economic Growth" ===
Corrado's paper "Intangible Capital and U.S. Economic Growth" that she co-authored with Charles Hulten and Daniel Sichel analyzes the exclusion of intangible investment from calculated GDP and the impact it has on measured economic growth. The authors state that standard accounting practices do not include certain intangible investments, which they argue represent an increasing share of the United States economy. Subsequently, modern accounting measures omit a large percentage of actual GDP in their calculated measure. By including intangibles in their measure Corrado, Hulten and Sichel find that over "$3 trillion of business intangible capital stock" has been left out of calculated GDP measures and lead to inaccurate representations of the United States economic growth. The paper was awarded the Kendrick Prize in 2010. It has been cited in Businessweek, The Economist, and The New York Times.

=== "Improving GDP: Demolishing, Repointing or Extending?*" ===
In "Improving GDP: Demolishing, Repointing or Extending?*", Corrado evaluates the validity of GDP as a metric for modern economic activity. Corrado offers a modern re-evaluation of the measure proposing that it should "measure intangible and environmental capital, to quality-adjust prices, to run online experiments on willingness-to-pay for free goods" along with "extending GDP to measure economic well-being better: using some of the components of GDP such as consumption, along with leisure and measures of security" to accurately represent the transformed modern economy. She points out that the current measure is susceptible to double counting and does not account for necessary market weights which is currently measured by prices. To fix this Corrado recommends that we need to "repoint" GDP to account for prices that are "quality-adjusted" in the rapidly expanding "knowledge economy" which is experiencing a digital paradigm. The digitization of the "knowledge economy" is leading to an increase in non-market activities that are not accounted for in the current GDP measure as it strictly measures market production. Thus a reappointed GDP measure needs to redefine and reestablish the "boundary line" between non-market and market production that has become increasingly blurred by digitization.

=== "Innovation and intangible investment in Europe, Japan, and the United States" ===
"Innovation and intangible investment in Europe, Japan, and the United States" measures innovation by analyzing intangible investment and its relation with information and communication technology, spillovers, and policy. Corrado's paper examines the various perspective of innovation by providing a clear understanding of the diverse approaches to innovation. She points out that many believe innovation in EU countries is decreasing and more innovation is necessary in order to fix destabilized economies. The paper examines definitions of innovation and methods for its measurement, including the impact of government policy She finds that current measures of innovation are too ambiguous and are in need of additional measures that together form a more complete framework. She notes that innovation has largely shifted from being tangible to intangible, a reality important to consider when analyzing modern growth and innovation. As a result, she proposes a new model of measurement that takes into account intangible investment within the framework of computerized information, innovative property, and economic competencies in addition to the already measured intangibles of research and development, and software. From this measurement Corrado finds that in the United States intangible capital accounts for half of their total capital deepening where as in the EU countries it only accounts for 23.8%. She concludes that variables affecting the monetization of knowledge investments are linked to economic growth in the EU.

=== Book ===
In 2005 Corrado along with John Haltiwanger and Daniel Sichel released the book Measuring Capital in the New Economy. The book examines how technology has altered the U.S. economy, increasing the role of intangible assets and technology investment. They propose a variety of new approaches and necessary factors that should be included in calculations of capital in order to create more accurate measures of capital in the changing economy.

- Corrado, C., Haltiwanger, J.C., & Sichel, D.E. (2005). Measuring Capital in the New Economy. Chicago: The University of Chicago Press.

=== The Conference Board Executive Action Reports ===
- Corrado, C., & Hao, J. X. (2014) The Growing Value of Brands and Their Contribution to Worldwide Economic Growth. The Conference Board.
- Corrado, C. (2013) Investments in Intellectual Property: New Footprints in Macroeconomic Data. The Conference Board.

=== Other publications ===
- Corrado, C., Hulten, C., & Sichel, D. (2002) Measuring Capital and Technology: an expanded framework. The University of Chicago Press.
- Corrado, C., & Mattey, J. (1997) Capacity Utilization. Journal of Economic Perspectives 11(1).
- Corrado, C., Haskel, J., Jona-Lasinio, C., & Iommi, M. (2012) Intangible capital and growth in advanced economies: Measurement methods and comparative results. IZA Discussion Papers.
- Corrado, C., Van Ark, B., Hao, J. X., & Hulten, C. (2009) Measuring Intangible Capital and its Contribution to Economic Growth in Europe. EIB Papers, 14(1), 62-93.
- Corrado, C., Haskel, J., & Jona-Lasinio, C. (2017) Knowledge Spillovers, ICT and Productivity Growth. Oxford Bulletin of Economics and Statistics.
- Corrado, C., & Hulten, C. (2010) How do you Measure a "Technological Revolution"? American Economic Review, 100(5), 99-104.
- Corrado, C., Van Ark, B., Erumban, A., & Levanon, G. (2016) Navigating the Digital Economy: Capturing the Benefits from Increased Flexibility and Cost Reductions – CFO Implications. The Conference Board.
- Corrado, C., Van Ark, B., Erumban, A., & Levanon, G. (2016) Navigating the New Digital Economy: Driving Digital Growth and Productivity from Installation to Deployment. The Conference Board.
- Corrado, C., Haskel, J., & Jona-Lasinio, C. (2019) Productivity Growth, Capital Reallocation and the Financial Crisis: Evidence from Europe and the US. Journal of Macroeconomics, 61.
- Corrado, C., Haskel, J., Jona-Lasinio, C., & Iommi, M. (2018) Intangible investment in the EU and US before and since the Great Recession and its contribution to productivity growth. Journal of Infrastructure, Policy and Development, 2.
- Corrado, C., Haskel, J., & Jona-Lasinio, C. (2017) Public Intangibles: The Public Sector and Economic Growth in the SNA. Review of Income and Wealth, 63.
- Corrado, C., & Byrne, D. (2017) "ICT Asset Prices: Marshaling Evidence into New Measures. Finance and Economics Discussion Series.
- Corrado, C., & Byrne, D. (2017) What do they tell us about Productivity and Technology? Finance and Economic Discussion Series.
- Corrado, C., Haskel, J., & Jona-Lasinio, C. (2016) Intangibles, ICT and industry productivity growth: Evidence from the EU. The World Economy: Growth or Stagnation?, 319-346.

== Awards ==
Corrado was the first place recipient of the Indigo Prize in 2017 for her work calculating the remaining GDP for the 21st century, additionally, she has received a special achievement award from the Board of Governors of the Federal Reserve System in 1998. In 2003 Corrado was awarded the Julius Shiskin award from the American Statistical Association for her statistical work regarding industrial production, capacity measurement, productivity measurement and information technology output and prices. In 2010 she was the winner of the Kendricks Prize awarded by the International Association of Research on Income and Wealth for her paper Intangible Capital and U.S. Economic Growth.
