= Ukrsotsbank =

Bank of Ukraine

- Native name: "Укрсоцбанк"
- Formerly: Bank Pekao Ukraine, UniCredit Bank Ukraine – Ukrsotsbank
- Company type: Public company
- Industry: Commercial bank
- Founded: Lutsk, Ukraine (1997)
- Defunct: 2019
- Headquarters: Kyiv, Ukraine
- Area served: Ukraine
- Key people: Tamara Savoshchenko (Executive director)
- Products: Retail, investment and private banking, investment management, public finance
- Net income: ▲ ₴ 10.988 billion (2013)
- Total assets: ▲ ₴ 43.057 billion (2014)
- Total equity: ▲ ₴ 8.668 billion (2014)
- Owner: АВН Holdings (99.9%)
- Number of employees: ▲4,830 (2015)
- Website: ukrsotsbank.com

Ukrsotsbank (in 2013–2016 known as UniCredit Bank – Ukrsotsbank) was a Ukrainian bank. It was a subsidiary of Alfa Group via a Luxembourg incorporated company АВН Holdings. In October 2019 Ukrsotsbank was fully merged with Alfa-Bank (Ukraine).

== History ==
=== Bank Pekao – UniCredit ===
The bank was founded in 1997 in Lutsk as the branch of Polish company Bank Pekao. In 1999 UniCredito Italiano acquired Bank Pekao and in 2005 HypoVereinsbank became the intermediate parent company of the bank. Since 2006 the bank offices in Ukraine carried the name UniCredit Bank (Ukraine). In 2011 UniCredit acquired a major Ukrainian bank "Ukrsotsbank" that traces its history to the late Soviet Union.

=== Ukrsotsbank ===
Ukrsots bank was established in October of 1990 and based on the Ukrainian republican chambers of the Soviet Sotsbank. Ukrsotsbank was registered with the Soviet State Bank.

On 11 January 2016 UniCredit Group sold Ukrsotsbank to ABH Holdings, a subsidiary of Alfa Group. In exchange, UniCredit acquired 9.9% stake of ABH Holdings.

In October 2019 Ukrsotsbank was fully merged with Alfa-Bank (Ukraine), who became the "full successor of all rights and obligations of Ukrsotsbank with respect to its clients, partners and counterparties." In September 2019 Ukrsotsbank shareholders had approved this merger with Alfa-Bank.

== Gallery ==
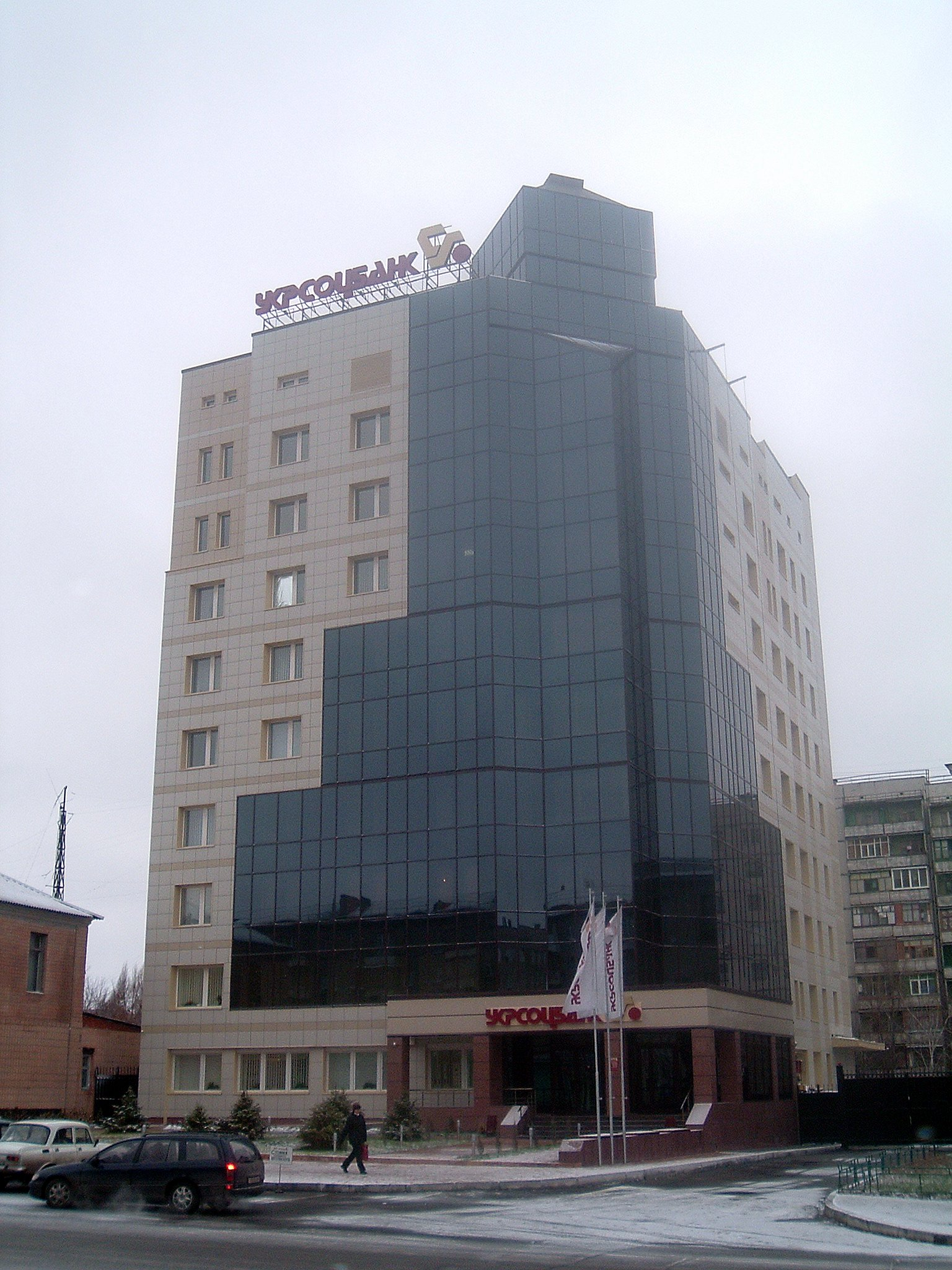
Office in Luhansk, 2005

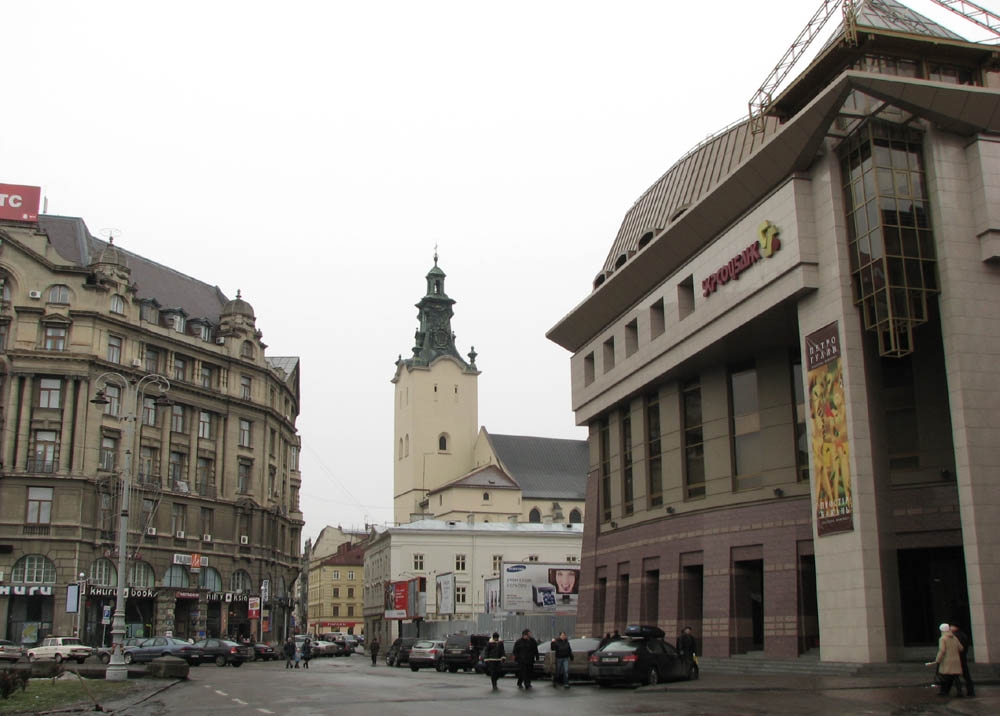
Office in Lviv, 2008

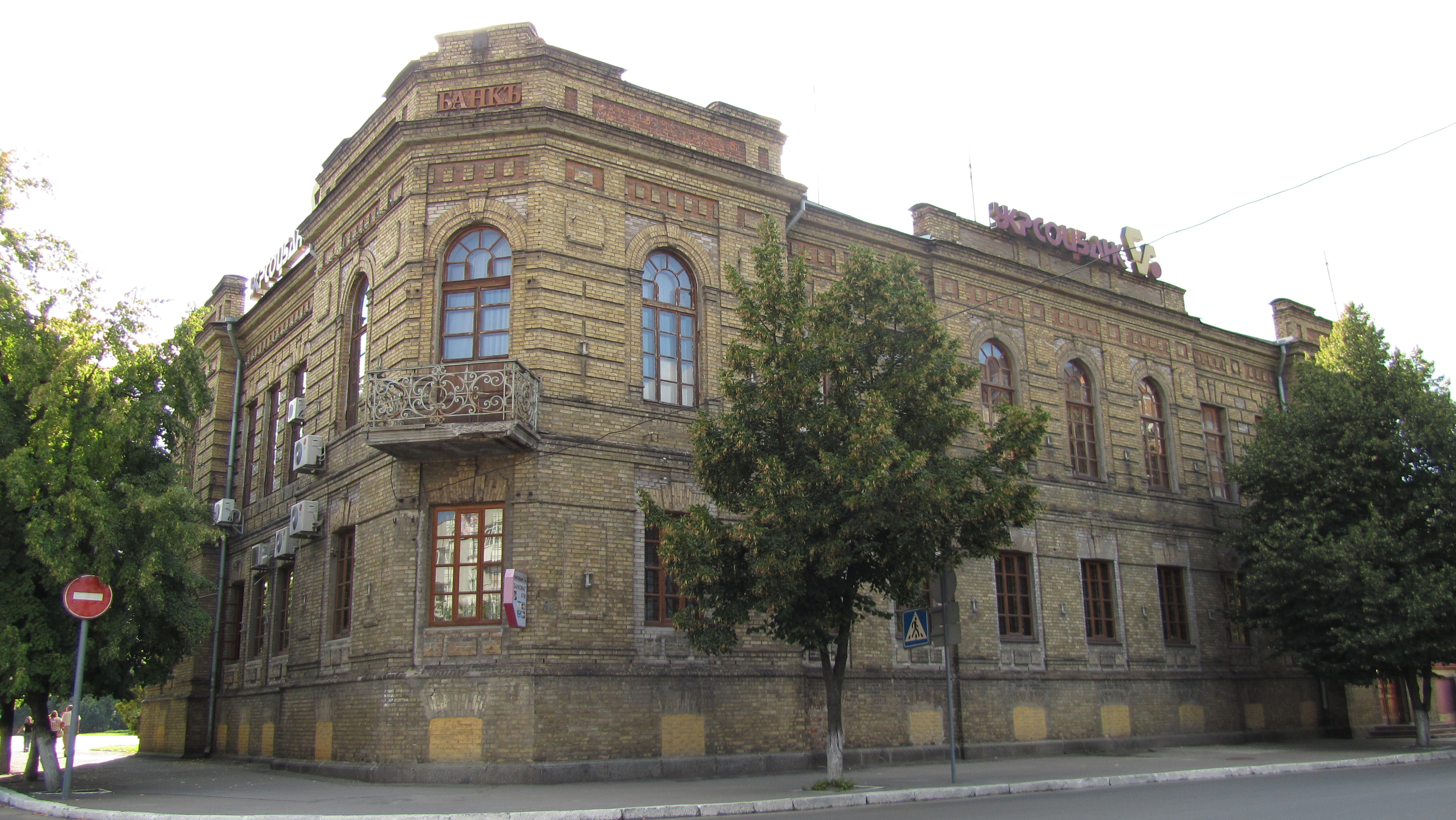
Office in Kremenchuk, 2011

== See also ==
Other Ukrainian banks created in the Soviet Union

- Prominvestbank
- State Savings Bank of Ukraine
