= Indigo Era =

Economic concept by businessman Mikhail Fridman

The Indigo Era (or Indigo economies) is a concept publicized by businessman Mikhail Fridman, describing what he views as an emerging new era of economies and economics based on ideas, innovation, and creativity, replacing those based on the possession of natural resources. Fridman is the co-founder of LetterOne, an international investment business, and first publicized the idea in early 2016. The word "indigo" was initially chosen based on the term indigo children, which has been used to describe people with unusual and innovative abilities.

Fridman describes the Indigo Era as a disruptive era driven by extraordinary levels of human creativity, where abnormally talented individuals and entities are able to realize new levels of human potential and economic achievement. It is "a new economic era where the main source of national wealth is no longer resource rent but the socio-economic infrastructure that allows every person to realise his or her intellectual or creative potential." But, according to Fridman – based on his observations of recent economic indicators, political and market volatility, and historical patterns – it is also an era that will generate winners and losers as lagging countries and groups fail to adapt quickly enough.

In late 2016 LetterOne's Global Perspectives journal published an Indigo Index, ranking 152 countries on their ability to compete and grow as economies move away from being powered by natural resources to being powered by ideas, creativity, and digital skills. In 2017 it launched the Indigo Prize, to award new concepts of economic measurement beyond mere GDP as countries in the 21st century transition into economies where innovation, creativity, and digital skills are economic drivers. The competition is intended to "stimulate debate about factors currently measured, given evolving economies, technology and skill bases, and what should now be taken into consideration in official economic statistics that measure the health, size and growth of a modern economy."

== Origin ==
In an April 2016 article in RealClearPolitics and reprinted in the Jerusalem Post, Fridman wrote:

We are entering a disruptive era driven by extraordinary levels of human creativity. A new generation of curious, strong-willed and talented individuals is unhindered by convention or the past. This new “Indigo” generation is now shaping tomorrow's economy and creating national wealth. I use the term Indigo because it has been used to refer to children with special or unusual abilities. This is an era where abnormally talented individuals and entities are now able to realize new levels of human potential and economic achievement.

LetterOne's Global Perspectives website adds that the indigo symbolism "embodies a breaking of the norm, something that is highly reflective of the new era that we are entering into, one that lacks convention and is driven by innovation."

== Analysis ==
In a series of articles published in 2016, Fridman cites the recent extreme volatility in markets, and worldwide political change and instability, as signs of an emerging global shift. He notes two frequently cited prominent indicators of an economic shift: the sharp decline in prices of natural resources including oil, and the slowing of China's economic growth despite this decline in the cost of natural resources.

He and other commentators also note the rise of populism and populist leaders and candidates, both right-wing and left-wing, as these changes occur. Meanwhile, companies like Apple and Google – digital and technological companies he calls "Indigo companies" – have replaced longterm traditional natural-resource or manufacturing companies such as Exxon as the world's largest companies.

Fridman observes that throughout history innovations, alternatives, and technologies have always overcome any perceived shortages of any natural resource. He therefore posits that the new "Indigo era", fueled by digital and technological resources, will be marked by a shift away from the struggle for natural resources and their perceived scarcity, to a reliance on ideas, innovation, and creativity and on supporting the intellectual and creative potential of each human being: "The world has entered a new era where the source of a nation's wealth is no longer natural resources. Intellectual capacity has now replaced land, raw materials and trade routes as the biggest source of wealth."

According to Fridman, three interconnected factors are needed for successful Indigo companies and an Indigo economy:

- intuitive individual talent and a high level of education, plus the ability to form a team of equally educated and gifted people
- a sophisticated and complex ecosystem, which includes not only legal systems that protect physical and intellectual property rights and protection from takeover by larger companies, but also thousands of suppliers and subcontractors to supply high-quality services which range from venture capital to marketing to web design and other technologies and services
- a global digital infrastructure to distribute new products and accumulate customer data and customer-behavior insight

He notes that most emerging economies have focused on building physical structures (roads, buildings, cities, physical infrastructure) rather than the complex legal, political, and social systems, institutions, and changes that will support an effective free and innovative intellectual-resource economy. The freedoms, protections, and political and legal frameworks of developed Western countries rest on centuries-long histories, socio-political traditions, and mindsets, and therefore will be difficult to replicate quickly in emerging economies. Fridman singles out India as an emerging country that has adequate legal infrastructure and freedom to probably survive the Indigo shift.

Fridman considers the growth of Indigo economies to be a paradigm shift; he states that the pace at which technology is developing is creating worldwide tectonic shifts, and predicts huge global change over the next five to ten years. He and other analysts predict that the growing economic gap between free, creative economies and groups in contrast to repressive, authoritarian, totalitarian, or tradition-bound economies or groups will widen and create resentment and hostilities – whether this is between nations or within nations. Those left behind may be either emerging countries, or the average person – as opposed to the intellectual elites – within developed Western countries.

Authoritarian leaders and authoritarianism often rise during periods of uncertainty and insecurity and economic deprivation. Fridman maintains however that in this ever-changing new economic era, the main source of wealth in a country or region will no longer be a natural resource, but a social infrastructure that will allow everyone to realise their intellectual and creative potential. Therefore, he asserts that "The future Indigo economy is an economy of free people. And this means that the world will become more and more free."

In November 2016 LetterOne launched a journal, Global Perspectives, as a platform to explore "the new emerging economic era, the Indigo era, from different perspectives, including education, religion, politics, economics, history and business" and to examine "global issues through the eyes of leading commentators and business people around the world". The inaugural issue contained articles by Fridman, Dominic Barton, Michael Bloomberg, Stan Greenberg, Carl Bildt, Vince Cable, Ken Robinson, Brent Hoberman, Alex Klein, Deirdre McCloskey, Yuri Milner, Nick D'Aloisio, Lynda Gratton, Parag Khanna, Ian Goldin, George Freeman, Ian Bremmer, and others.

== Indigo Index and Indigo Score ==
The November 2016 inaugural issue of Global Perspectives also published an Indigo Index, which rated 152 countries based on five key metrics for doing business as economies move away from being powered by natural resources to being powered by creativity and digital skills. The five metrics are: creativity and innovation, economic diversity, digital economy, freedom, and stability and legal frameworks, which were scored based on over 30 measures from published data sources such as the World Bank, UNESCO, the CIRI Human Rights Data Project, the Center for International Development at Harvard University, and the Global Education Monitoring Report. The index sought to measure a country's entrepreneurial ecosystem, and therefore its potential to adapt and develop.

Each country was given a combined overall Indigo Score, with 200 being the highest possible score. The 10 top-ranked countries were Sweden, Switzerland, Finland, Denmark, the UK, the Netherlands, Norway, Germany, Ireland, and Japan. The United States was 18th overall.

The report also included three key findings: Creativity and innovation was the biggest overall driver of high scores; this accentuated the importance of fostering entrepreneurialism and lifelong learning and of investing heavily in people. Nordic countries scored particularly high on the Indigo Index, with three Nordic countries in the top four and four Nordic countries in the top ten; this was attributed to their high rankings both in creativity and innovation and in freedom. And the lowest-scoring countries were beset with social and political problems, such as war, political turmoil, and corruption.

== Indigo Prize ==
In July 2017, LetterOne's Global Perspectives journal announced the Indigo Prize, to stimulate discussion towards finding a new way of measuring the economy in the 21st century that moves beyond the limitations of mere GDP measurements.

Entrants were asked to submit an essay of up to 5,000 words answering the question:

How would you design a new economic measure for global economies that fully acknowledges not only social and economic factors but the impact of creativity, entrepreneurship and digital skills? How should your new measure be used to improve the way we measure GDP in official statistics?

Entries were due 15 September 2017, and were open worldwide to groups or individuals over the age of 16, with entries particularly encouraged from people at academic institutions, businesses, charities, think tanks, consultancies, or other organisations. The award amount was announced as £100,000, with second- and third-place winners to receive £25,000 and £10,000.

The judging panel included:

- Dominic Barton, global managing partner at McKinsey & Company
- Mervyn Davies, non-executive chairman of LetterOne, former Minister of State for Trade, Investment and Small Business, former chairman and CEO of Standard Chartered
- Stephanie Flanders, chief market strategist at JP Morgan Asset Management and former BBC economics editor
- Jim O'Neill, former Commercial Secretary to the Treasury, former Goldman Sachs chief economist
- Lynda Gratton, author and professor of Management Practice at the London Business School
- Brent Hoberman, founder of Lastminute.com and Founders Forum
- Gus O'Donnell, chairman of Frontier Economics, former Cabinet Secretary
- Ed Vaizey, Member of Parliament and former Minister for Culture, Communications and Creative Industries
- Mikhail Fridman, co-founder of LetterOne

The winners of the inaugural Indigo Prize were announced on 25 October 2017. A joint first prize, £125,000 to be equally split, was awarded to two teams of writers: Diane Coyle and Benjamin Mitra-Kahn; and Jonathan Haskel, Carol Corrado, et al. A third place "Rising star" award of £10,000 was given to Alice Lassman.

Coyle was professor of economics at the University of Manchester, and Mitra-Kahn is chief economist at IP Australia. They proposed radically replacing GDP with a dashboard measuring six key assets: physical assets, natural capital, human capital, intellectual property, social and institutional capital, and net financial capital. Their essay stated that "GDP never pretended to be a measure of economic welfare", and proposed that the new measure should assess "the range of assets needed to maximise individuals' capabilities to lead the life they would like to lead"; this would include "financial and physical capital but also natural and intangible capital". They asserted that the new statistics should focus on measuring changes in the stock of important assets, rather than flows of income, expenditure, and output. Tracking the evolution of stocks of physical assets, financial assets and liabilities, natural capital, skill levels, and implicit state liabilities would better measure the sustainability of the economy. Coyle and Mitra-Kahn also proposed interim improvements to GDP measurements – such as better measurement of intangibles, adjusting for the distribution of income, and removing unproductive financial activity – before scrapping it entirely. Following her prize-winning essay, Coyle now leads the Six Capitals research project, funded by LetterOne, at the Bennett Institute for Public Policy at Cambridge University; the project was inaugurated in January 2019 and explores social and natural capital.

Haskel is professor of economics at Imperial College Business School. Rather than abandoning GDP, he proposed refining, updating, and extending the existing GDP measure. He proposed better measurement of services and intangibles, and direct measurement of the economic welfare being created by digital goods. His essay focused on the fact that economies have dramatically changed structure since GDP was originally developed, with more knowledge production, more digital goods, more free things and free information, and more intangible assets such as intellectual property. He also emphasized the importance of factoring in the environment, sustainability, and societal welfare, in addition to calculating the value of goods and services that are provided for free.

Lassman, the recipient of the "Rising star" award, was a 19-year-old geography student at Durham University. Her entry proposed a "Global Integration and Individual Potential" index, which measures each nation on two levels: its value relative to other nations, and the individuals and their contributions within each nation.
