= Telecom corruption scandal =

2012 bribery case in Uzbekistan

The Telecom corruption scandal is a 2012 corruption case involving the daughter of President Islam Karimov of Uzbekistan, Gulnara Karimova, accepting bribes from several foreign telecom companies in exchange for contracts to do business within Uzbekistan. Revelations showed that Karimova was paid bribes through a series of shell companies by a series of firms seeking to negotiate with her directly. In addition, it was discovered that more industries had paid bribes for access to Uzbekistan than simply telecom firms.

== Background ==
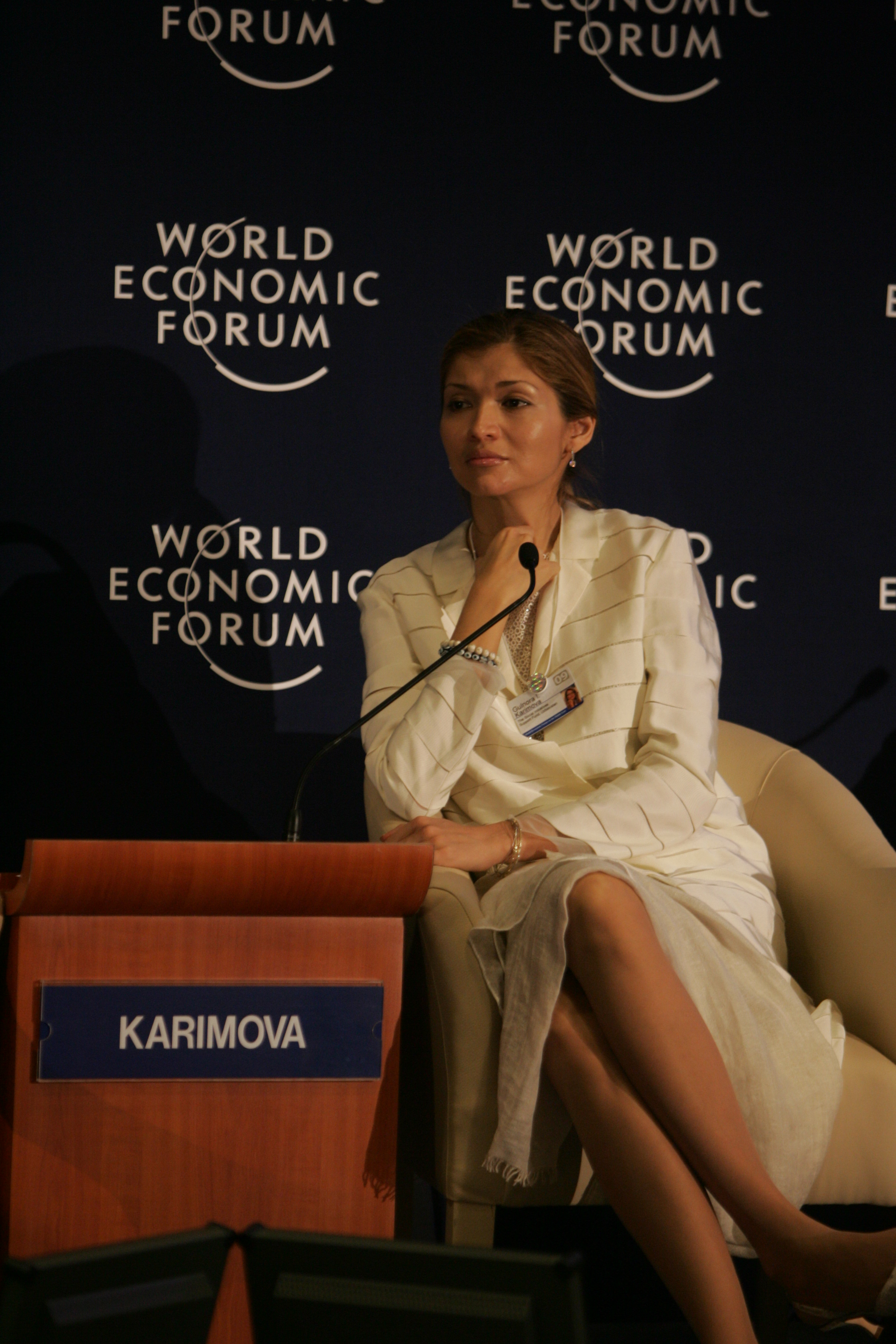
Gulnara Karimova

A Swiss criminal investigation begun in 2012 was directed at first against four Uzbek citizens who had connections to Karimova. Two of them were arrested that year and freed on bail. Also in 2012, a Swedish TV documentary stated that a Swedish telecom group, TeliaSonera, in exchange for licenses and frequencies in Uzbekistan, had paid $320 million to a Gibraltar-based shell company, Takilant, that was reportedly linked to Karimova. TeliaSonera denied the charges.

== Revelations ==
In January 2013, Swedish investigators released new documents apparently showing that TeliaSonera had tried to negotiate directly with Karimova. In the same year, US and Dutch authorities began investigating her.

In February 2014, the chief executive of TeliaSonera was forced resign after serious failures of due diligence were uncovered. In May, the Swedish media made documents public that suggested Karimova had aggressively dictated the terms of the TeliaSonera contract and threatened it with obstruction by several Uzbek government ministries if it did not agree to make illegal payments. Related money-laundering investigations in Switzerland and Sweden continued throughout the year, and hundreds of millions of dollars in accounts connected to the case being frozen by authorities. By the end of the year, Swedish criminal proceedings were underway.

It was reported in March 2014 that Swiss authorities had begun a money-laundering investigation into Karimova and corruption in Uzbekistan, and prosecutors in Bern said that the evidence had led their investigation into Sweden and France and that they had “seized assets in excess of 800 million Swiss francs ($912 million).”

It was also revealed in 2014 that the US Justice Department and SEC were investigating Vimpelcom Ltd., based in Amsterdam; the Russian firm Mobile TeleSystems PJSC; and Sweden's TeliaSonera AB. These three firms had funneled hundreds of millions of dollars to firms controlled by Karimova. An August 2015 report stated that US prosecutors were asking authorities in Ireland, Belgium, Luxembourg, Sweden, and Switzerland to seize assets of about $1 billion in connection with their investigation into corruption by the three above-mentioned global telecoms and other firms liked to Karimova. US authorities believed Karimova was the principal of a “$1 billion fortune scattered across the continent.” In November 2015, it was reported that Karimova was possibly on the run. Reports stated that she had been seen at a restaurant in Tashkent.

It was reported in January 2015 that although executives at the Norwegian telecom firm Telenor, which owns one-third of Vimpelcom, claimed that they had uncovered no signs of corruption, a newly released document indicated that Telenor had knowledge about millions in bribes.

== Results ==
On March 20, 2015, the US Department of Justice (DOJ) "asked Sweden to freeze $30 million in funds held by a Stockholm-based bank", as part of its activities ending the corruption scheme. of Karimova and Talikant. At the time, Karimova was reportedly under house arrest in connection with a corruption investigation. Meanwhile, investigations were underway in Switzerland, Sweden, Norway, France and the Netherlands focusing on shell companies allegedly used by the three multinational telecoms “to pay bribes and gain access to the lucrative Uzbek mobile phone market.” The DOJ probe uncovered the fact that all three firms had “paid bribes to Uzbek officials to obtain mobile telecommunications business in Uzbekistan and that funds involved in the scheme were laundered through shell companies and financial accounts around the world, including accounts held in Sweden, to conceal the true nature of these illegal payments.” European investigators revealed that Takilant was run by Gayane Avakyan, a former Karimova aide.

According to Swiss newspaper Le Temps, “500 million francs of the seized funds involved TeliaSonera, a major telephone company and mobile network operator in Sweden and Finland, and the rest involved Karimova’s personal assets.”

A July 1, 2015, report stated that US authorities were seeking to seize $300 million in bank accounts in Ireland, Luxembourg and Belgium, alleging that the funds were the proceeds of corrupt payments in Uzbekistan by MTS and Vimpelcom, presumably to Karimova, between 2004 and 2011.

An August 2015 Radio Free Europe/Radio Liberty (RFE/RL) report stated that Uzbek authorities had arrested nine suspects in connection with their probe of Karimova's corruption activities. Among those taken into custody were two top executives at a Coca-Cola bottling plant in Uzbekistan, which Karimova formerly owned.

On September 17, 2015, it was reported that TeliaSonera was “deeply shaken” by the corruption scandal in Uzbekistan, and that it would be pulling out of all of central Asia as a result of “heavy investor and public pressure.” It was revealed that the US Department of Justice, along with Swedish prosecutors, had initiated investigations into corruption allegations at TeliaSonera.

In October 2015, Norway's government demanded the resignation of Telenor chairman Svein Aaser on account of the Uzbekistan corruption scandal.

== Reactions ==
Reportedly, Karimova “ran afoul of her father,” who refused to comment on the accusations against her. Previously, in 2013, Karimova accused Uzbek security services on Twitter of harassing her and deceiving her father about her.

Her sister, Lola, rejected her, however. In return, Karimova accused Lola, Uzbekistan's UNESCO ambassador, who lives in a $40 million mansion in Geneva, of hiding secret stashes of dollars somewhere in the president's palace. In early 2014, Gulnara claimed her sister had sent goons to physically harm her because she wished to go to Israel for medical care. Gulnara smuggled out a letter informing the media of her arrest, claiming the "reason for the Pinochet-style persecution is that I dared to speak up about things that millions are quiet about." Karimova was put under house arrest in February 2014. She stated that she and her 16-year-old daughter were prohibited from visiting the president. She claimed to have been the target of police violence and asserted that she had been refused medical and psychological treatment.
