= Andrey Rogachev =

Russian entrepreneur and billionaire

Andrey Vladimirovich Rogachev
- Андре́й Влади́мирович Рогачёв'
- Born: January 17, 1964 (age 62); Tula, Soviet Union (USSR)
- Education: Leningrad Hydrometeorology Institute
- Occupation: Entrepreneur
- Known for: Russian dollar billionaire from retail businesses
- Children: 2

Andrey Rogachev (Russian: Андре́й Влади́мирович Рогачёв', born January 17, 1964) is a Russian entrepreneur. He was the first Russian dollar billionaire who made a fortune not from privatization or trading in natural resources. Instead he made his fortune from producing environmental instruments.

Rogachev has been called the father of Russian retail. He is the co-owner of Food trading platform AGRO24 and retail chain Vernii. He was formerly the co-owner of electronic payment system Spacard, co-owner of retail chain Pyaterochka Russian: Пятёрочка (сеть магазинов), one of the ex-co-owners and directors of X5 Retail Group.

== Early life ==
Andrey Rogachev was born on January 17, 1964, in Tula in the Soviet Union. In 1981 he entered the Leningrad Hydrometeorology Institute, where he graduated in 1986, majoring in Hydrology.

== Career ==
In 1989, he created the Environmental Control Laboratory (LEK).

In 1991 Rogachev created electronic payment system Spacard and software to make trading operations between companies. Including electronic messaging system, a cryptography system, the second crypto currency in the world, plastic card with a unique method of encryption and data protection, a billing center, cash registers and portable payment terminals.

In 1998, Andrey Rogachev and his partners registered Agrotorg LLC. In February 1999 the company opened the first Pyaterochka store in St Petersburg; 15 more stores were opened by year-end. In 2001 Pyaterochka entered Moscow.

Following the merger with retail chain Perekrestok in 2006, X5 Retail Group was created; their main shareholders are Alfa Financial Group; Pyaterocka founders received approximately 25% of the shares (mainly owned by Rogachev and Alexander Gidra). In 2008, Rogachev quit X5's Board. In 2011 he sold his 11.14% of X5 shares, for approximately $1.38 billion. From 2010 he mainly focused on real property investments and other food retail businesses.

In 2012, Rogachev founded Verny, a chain of discounter stores «Vernii». At the beginning of 2015, the chain contained more than 400 stores in the Central, North-Western and in the Urals Districts of Russia.

In 2017 Rogachev together with Alexander Volchek (the founder of the biggest entrepreneur society "Business Molodost") launched Food Trading Platform AGRO24. Rogachev and Volchek are the founders and owners of the AGRO24 trading platform. The platform brings together suppliers, retailers and dealers and allows to conduct commercial transactions between them. The AGRO24 business model most similar to Bloomberg and 1688.com, which is a part of the Alibaba Group and is designed for wholesale b2b-trade between producers and buyers. Trading technology is easily integrated with smart contracts based on blockchain, crypto-currencies and other complex systems.

There is another example: mobile application Meicai created bridge between small farmers and restaurants. Investors considered its total value is $2.8B. Rogachev is telling that this is aim for AGRO24 in 2019.

== Personal life ==
Rogachev is divorced with two children.
