= Rosvodokanal =

- Native name: ООО Росводоканал
- Company type: Public (PAO)
- Industry: Water
- Founded: 1949
- Headquarters: Moscow, Russia
- Owner: Alfa Group
- Website: rosvodokanal.ru

Rosvodokanal (Russian: OOO Росводоканал) is a Russian company deals with water utilities and water management. The company's headquarters are located in Moscow. The company is part of Alfa Group.

== History ==
The company was founded in 1949. Dated July 30 decree of the Council of Ministers of the USSR on establishment of Orgvodokanal-repair trust was founded, which started actual operations in October of the same year. Trust has developed projects and directed the construction of water supply, sewerage and wastewater treatment across the country. Once within the housing reform Russian Government was to attract the largest and most successful Russian private companies to manage public utilities, in 2003 Rosvodokanal was privatized and joined the Alfa Group, one of the largest financial-industrial conglomerates in Russia.

== See also ==
- Water supply and sanitation in Russia
