= Alfa Group =

Russian international industrial and financial group

Alfa Group Consortium Консорциум "Альфа-Групп"
- Type: Private
- Industry: Diversified investments conglomerate
- Founded: 1989
- Founder: Mikhail Fridman; Anatoly Potik; German Khan; Alexei Kuzmichov
- Area served: Russia, Turkey, Netherlands, Belarus, Kazakhstan, CIS
- Key people: Mikhail Fridman; Anatoly Potik; German Khan; Alexei Kuzmichev; Petr Aven
- Revenue: ▲US$16.613 billion (YE2012)
- Net income: ▼US$2.722 billion (YE2012)
- Total assets: ▲US$82.598 billion (YE2012)
- Total equity: ▲US$21.279 billion (YE2012)
- Subsidiaries: Alfa-Bank; Alfa Capital Management; Alfa Capital Partners; AlfaStrakhovanie Group; Altimo; X5 Group; A1 Group; Rosvodokanal Group
- Website: https://alfagroup.org/

Alfa Group Consortium (Russian: Консорциум «Альфа-Групп») is a Russian international privately owned investment group, with interests in oil and gas, commercial and investment banking, asset management, insurance, retail trade, telecommunications, water utilities and special situation investments.

The group was founded in 1989 as Alfa-Eco by Israeli-Russian businessman Mikhail Fridman together with US/(former USSR) businessman Anatoly Potik. Alfa Eco was formed as a joint venture by Anatoly Potik's company ADP Trading (20% stake) and Mikhail Fridman's company Alfa-Foto (80% stake) Russian Ministry of Finance TIN Number 7728112961. Later German Khan, Alexei Kuzmichov, Alexander Kushev, and several other partners joined.

As a holding company, in the financial year ending December 2010 Alfa Group had total assets of US$59,900 million, total equity of US$21,790 million and profit for the financial year of US$2,810 million. Return on shareholders' equity were recorded at 13.4%.

In April 2012, Altimo sold its entire 25.1% stake in MegaFon to a private investor and to MegaFon for US $5.2 bln.

== Ownership structure and joint ventures ==
Its central holding company is located in Gibraltar and under the direction of Franz Wolf, the son of Markus Wolf. (Note: Franz Thomas Alexander Wolf (b. May 1953, Berlin), who is the son of the former East Germany's Stasi member Markus Wolf, is a representative of the Liechtenstein based Crown Finance Foundation and a director with the Gibraltar based CTF Holdings which, in 2013, had $60 billion investments from Mikhail Fridman's Alfa Group and is close to both Petr Aven's Alfa-Bank and Alexey Kuzmichev. His numerous very controversial business interests were revealed in April 2013: he is a director of Ventrelt Holdings, A Common Holdings Limited, Altima Holdings Limited, and A2 Investive Limited, and a manager of Ola Holdings Limited which are all based in Tortola; and a manager of Eco Telecom Limited which is based in Gibraltar. In 2002, Crown Resources, a company that has Alexey Kuzmichev as its director and is associated with Franz Wolf, Mikhail Fridman, Alfa Group, German Khan, and Alfa-Eco, which became A1 in 2006, chartered a singled walled 26 year-old Bahamian flagged tanker Prestige which was laden with 77,000 tons of heavy fuel oil on-loaded at both St. Petersburg, Russia, and Ventspils, Latvia, but sank off the Galician coast of Spain spilling 20,000 tons of its petroleum cargo along the Spanish coast.) Alfa Group has ownership stakes in the following companies and joint ventures:

- ABH Holdings S.A. — a private investment holding company headquartered in Luxembourg with investments in banking groups across the CIS and Europe, which includes:
  - ABH Financial Limited, operates mainly through Alfa-Bank (Russia) — wholly owned commercial and investment bank and one of Russia's largest, private banks,
  - Amsterdam Trade Bank in the Netherlands — a subsidiary of Alfa-Bank (Russia),
  - Alfa-Bank (Belarus),
  - Alfa-Bank (Kazakhstan),
  - Alfa Capital Markets, а financial subsidiary in Cyprus.
- AlfaStrakhovanie Group, one of the largest Russian insurers with a diversified portfolio of comprehensive business and retail insurance products.
- X5 Group, the largest food retail operator in Russia in terms of sales. Operates Pyaterochka, one of the largest discount grocery retailers in Russia in terms of sales, Perekrestok, which runs a leading chain of supermarkets in Russia, and Karusel, one of the largest hypermarket chains in Russia. Listed on London Stock Exchange under the symbol FIVE. Alfa Group owns 47.86% of the company, 19.85% stake belongs to the founders of Pyaterochka.
- TNK-BP, one of the top ten privately owned oil companies in the world in terms of crude oil production. The company was formed in 2003 as a result of the merger of BP's Russian oil and gas assets and the oil and gas assets of Alfa Group, Access Industries and Renova Group (AAR). BP and AAR each own 50% of TNK-BP. In 2013, the company was acquired by Rosneft, with Alfa Group's cut almost fourteen billion.
- VimpelCom, one of the world's largest groups of integrated telecommunications services operators. Listed on the New York Stock Exchange under the symbol VIP. Alfa through Altimo owns 24.998%, Norwegian telco Telenor owns 25.007% of shares, and 29.626% stake is owned by Weather Investments of Sawiris family.
- Turkcell, Turkey's largest mobile operator. Alfa Group controls 13.22% stake in the company with Swedish telco TeliaSonera.
- Rosvodokanal Group, a leading private operator of water utilities in Russia and CIS.
- A1 Group, former Alfa-Eco, wholly owned special situations investment company.
- LetterOne Group, an investment vehicle specialising in energy, technology and private equity.
- Alfa Capital Management, an asset management company, which serves Russian as well as international institutional and private clients.
- IDS Borjomi International, the manufacturer of naturally carbonated mineral water from springs in the Borjomi Gorge of central Georgia.

There are a number of current disputes regarding Alfa's ownership of various stakes in telecoms companies.

Alfa Group is notably involved in a commercial dispute with Norwegian mobile phone company Telenor over the control of Russian company Vimpelcom

== Legal disputes ==
Over 10 years, Alfa Group has found itself in legal battle with business partners from Canada (NoreX), Great Britain (BP), Sweden (TeliaSonera), Norway (Telenor), Turkey and Indonesia. Federal Reserve executive Paul Volcker has accused Alfa Group of violation of the UN sanctions against Iraq during Saddam Hussein's regime, and for pressure exercised against KPMG during their spring 2005 investigation of a Bermuda registered, Russian telecom company, Ipoc International. To counter the Bermuda government supported audit by KPMG of Ipoc International, Alfa Group hired Diligence, founded by Richard Burt and Lord Powell of Bayswater with Diligence Europe headed by Michael Howard. Diligence began its Project Yucca to infiltrate KPMG. The Bermuda government accused Diligence of impersonating secret service personnel to obtain KPMG information about KPMG's audit of IPOC International Growth Fund Ltd. The Bermuda government accused Alfa Group's Ipoc International of money laundering. Alfa Group stated that Diligence was not hired by Alfa Group but by BGR which was founded by Haley Barbour. BGR had worked for Alfa Group's telecom Altimo. Project Yucca ended on October 18, 2005, when KPMG received papers from Project Yucca. During Project Yucca, the shareholders of Diligence were CEO Nick Day who was a former British agent, Chairman of Diligence Richard Burt who was a former United States ambassador to Germany under Reagan, the Exxel Group which is a Buenos Aires private equity firm, and Edward Mathias from Carlyle Group which is a private equity company from Washington, D.C.

== Dispute with NoreX and BP ==
Alfa Group's legal disputes with BP date back to 1991, when the Canadian oil company Norex represented a newly formed, Russian-Canadian joint venture in Siberia's oil industry, operating the marginal Chernogor oil-fields close to Khanty-Mansijsk. With the Russian company Chernogorneft, the Canadian company entered into a 60% ownership in the joint-venture Yugraneft. Later on, NoreX increased their stake to 97,64%, and in September 1998 Chernogorneft was filed with bankruptcy by the Tyumen Oil Company (TNK). The arbitration court of Khanty-Mansinsk proclaimed for Chernegorneft a new chief executive officer, with a background from Alfa Group. The main owner of Chernogorneft was BP, via their holding company Sidanko.

TNK gained control over 60% of Chernogorneft's debts, and the debt of US$35 million held by EBRD was reduced to US$9 million by Khanty-Mansijsk arbitration court on 30 July 1999. Thereby, TNK controlled 60% of the debt claims, and according to NoreX the Alfa Group took over Chernogorneft's oil sales below market prices. Resulting in a forced sell-out of the company, Sidanko (BP) was rejected from taking part in auctions, and remaining bidders were legally restrained from offering more than US$200 million for Chernegorneft - a mere fifth of its assumed value. On 26 November 1999, TNK took over all of Chernorogneft for US$172 million.

Letters of protest from prime minister Tony Blair to president Vladimir Putin helped little, the legally BP-owned company was forcibly sold to TNK below market price. TNK also got approval from the Khanty-Mansijsk arbitration court to take over Chernogorneft's stakes in two joint ventures, in spite of protests from venture partners Norex and Occidental Petroleum. BP fought on for years to retrieve its rightful ownership in Chernogorneft, and in August 2001 this got its first legal approval.

In 2000, according to NoreX, TNK started to undermine Yugraneft's oil transports through the national semi-monopolistic pipeline system Transneft. On 11 April and 26 June 2001, TNK again got two legal victories in the Khanty-Mansijsk arbitration court, first through a reversal of earlier regulation regarding Chernogorneft's stock capital in the joint-venture, and thereafter through a nullification of the voting powers in 497,142 out of the 600,000 shares held by NoreX. At an extraordinary annual assembly of Yugraneft on 28 June, NoreX' candidate for the CEO position was elected, but the day after TNK's security executive and 20 heavily armed guards appeared at the Yugraneft office with a false annual assembly protocol, installing Mr. A. Berman as CEO of Yugraneft. In June 2001, Yugraneft's owner Alex Rotzang contended that two British Virgin Islands shell companies Quenon investments limited and Shapburg limited which are closely associated with Mikhail Fridman and Alfa Group illegally gained control of Yugraneft through an armed seizure of Yugraneft's offices. In 1998, both Quenon and Shapburg formed the Luxembourg based Compagnie Financiere pour l'Atlantique du Nord which changed its name to Gaumur Holding in March 2000 and was entirely controlled by the Baugur Group of Iceland. Both Shapburg limited and the Gibraltar based AB Holdings limited, which is owned by Mikhail Fridman, co-founded the Alfa Bank subsidiary Alfa finance holdings SA based in Luxembourg. In March 2000, Alfa finance holdings SA succeeded AB Holdings limited as the parent holding of Alfa Bank Group. Norex' demands for investigation and nullification remained fruitless. Norex brought the case before a U.S. Federal court in New York in February 2002, demanding US$1.5 bn in redemption from TNK and Alfa Group.

The year after, BP and Alfa Group merged all their oil and gas interests into a 50/50 joint venture, in spite of BP's legal and financial losses in the Yugraneft disputes since 1999. The new venture controlled both Sidanko og TNK from 11 February 2003. The merger implied that NoreX' stake of 97% in Yugraneft come under control of Alfa Group and BP. NoreX, thereby, saw their possessions dwindle and transferred partly to BP, and appealed for copies of BP documents before a US court. Jones Day represented its client Alfa-Access-Renova (AAR) of Len Blavatnik, Mikhail Fridman, and Viktor Vekselberg in United States court. In 2004 the U.S. Supreme Court sustained Norex' right to appeal, but at a lower level the legal dispute went on for years, with only gradual victories for NoreX.

For a summary of the battle of control over TNK, BP, see: TNK-BP.

== Dispute with Telenor ==
Alfa started investing in VimpelCom in summer, 2001. The power-broking between Alfa group and Telenor in VimpelCom started 2004, when Alfa proposed that VimpelCom acquire a larger share in Ukrainian RadioSystems (URS), a small GSM operator in Ukraine operating under the brand «WellCom». Telenor found the price of US$132 million far too high, after the Russian telco Golden Telecom had declined acquiring URS at a far lower price. In October 2004, a minor shareholder of VimpelCom lodged three lawsuits against Telenor in the provincial city of Krasnoyarsk in Siberia, with claims that the VimpelCom shareholder agreement be cancelled, and the URS shares be acquired.

In May 2005, the Alfa Group filed a lawsuit against Telenor, via Alfa's daughter company Eco Telecom Ltd, contesting the declination of Telenor's three VimpelCom board members to approve the URS acquisition. Eco Telecom especially contested Telenor's vetoing power in the VimpelCom shareholder agreement. After the trial, Alfa Group declined during four years to take part in the board of managers meetings in Ukrainian Kyivstar, thereby blocking the normal procedures of annual assemblies, approval of accounts, and payments of dividends. In 2008 Telenor achieved several legal approvals in the U.S. Federal Court of Appeal in New York, and in 2009 the Alfa Group submitted to the rulings and took up normal shareholder activity in Kyivstar. In Russian VimpelCom, however, the Alfa Group geared up its legal battle with Telenor by nominating more directors than Alfa's capital share implied. In January 2007, a court of appeal in Geneva, Switzerland ruled that Alfa Group had violated the shareholder agreement of VimpelCom.

In November 2005, VimpelCom acquired 100% of URS, after having got approval from VimpelComs annual assembly. Thereby, the Alfa Group owns shares in both URS (Beeline Ukraina) via VimpelCom, and in Golden Telecom which operates in both Russia and Ukraine, and in Ukraine's major mobile operator Kyivstar GSM, and in Turkish Turkcell which owns a stake in the Ukrainian mobile operator Astelit. Telenor and Alfa disagree over the latter's ownership in three of Kyivstar's competitors in the Ukrainian market.

In 2004, Alfa Group's daughter company «Storm» filed a number of lawsuits against Telenor, to nullify a number of provisions in the Kyivstar charter and shareholder agreement. Alfa Group especially wanted to nullify an arbitration case that Telenor had lodged in New York, but was rejected. Alfa reacted to their legal loss by boycotting all normal shareholder activity in Kyivstar, for four years from 2004, effectively blocking the business of annual assemblies, and avoiding the consolidation and ratification of Kyivstar's annual accounts. No dividends were paid after 2003. In February 2006, Telenor took the issue to a U.S Federal court in New York. On 16 December 2008, Alfa Group resumed normal shareholder activities, joined in the election of a new board of directors, and agreed to pay accumulated dividends. On 11 March 2009, the Federal district court in New York ruled for the second time that Alfa companies Altimo, Storm, Alpren and Hardlake had revealed contempt for the court by not depositing their Kyivstar shares in the United States. Alfa Group was convicted to daily penalties of US$100,000 from 12 March, and a further 100,000 daily if not either Alfa's shares in Kyivstar be sold, or ownership in competing business be reduced to a maximum 5%. NeOn 28 April 2009, the New York court ruled that Alfa Group had submitted to the legal rulings. Judge Gerard E. Lynch established that Alfa Group had reduced their ownership in competing mobile operations in Ukraine.

=== Farimex vs. Telenor ===
In 2009 a small, Russian-owned company, Farimex Ltd, wholly owned by a Dimitrij Fridman, lodged a claim of US$5.7 bn from Telenor in compensation for Telenor's refusal to approve VimpelCom's acquisition of URS and market entry in Ukraine. Courts in Khanty-Mansiysk and Omsk have approved Farimex' claims and arrested Telenor's US$1,8 bn worth shares in VimpelCom in March 2009, but Telenor refuses to accept the legal premises and appeals the verdicts to the regional court of Tyumen, which is the last court of appeal before the federal level in Moscow.

Telenor Executive vice president Jan Edvard Thygesen has repeatedly said that a swap of shares in VimpelCom and Kyivstar between Telenor and Alfa Group is an option, but hard to achieve in practice.

When Minister of Foreign Affairs Jonas Gahr Støre visited his Russian counterpart Sergej Lavrov in Moscow on 24 March 2009, the strife between Alfa and Telenor was elevated to become the prime issue. Still, Telenor was presented by a claim from the Russian bailiff of US$1.7 bn, on 3 April, via a Norwegian district bailiff. Three days later, Telenor asked the federal arbitration court in Moscow to sustain this action until the Tyumen court had negotiated the substantial issue.

The case between Farimex and Telenor has aroused widespread, international concern. Roland Nash, Chief of research at Renaissance Capital viewed the case as a test to the credibility of Russia's legal system and openness to foreign investment. Russia analyst Christopher Granville views the Farimex vs. Telenor case as even more serious to Russia's credibility than earlier legal battles. And judge Gerard E. Lynch, presiding in the New York appeal cases lodged by Telenor over Kyivstar, has criticized Alfa Group's utilisation of remote courts in Western Siberia.

=== Agreement ===
In early October 2009, it became evident that Altimo (Alfa) and Telenor had for some time conducted negotiations for a solution to their conflicts. On 5 October, it was communicated that written agreement had been reached, to establish a joint holding company for VimpelCom and Kyivstar, named VimpelCom Ltd. The agreement says that the two main owners establish VimpelCom Ltd in Amsterdam and list it at the New York Stock Exchange. The holding company, and thereby VimpelCom and Kyivstar, will be owned 38,84% by Telenor and 38,46% by Altimo. The remaining stock capital, minimum 20%, is to remain free floating at any given time. The two main owners will have three board members each, and let the remaining owners appoint another three members of the Board of directors. That board of nine will appoint the holding company's CEO after an independent, international recruitment process. The agreement depends on all legal disputed concerning VimpelCom and Kyivstar to vanish, and it depends on the Russian Federation to allow Telenor to increase its ownership in VimpelCom.

== Dispute with TeliaSonera ==
Alfa Group and Swedish-Finnish TeliaSonera jointly own the Turkish mobile operator Turkcell.

In Turkey, TeliaSonera has acquired 47% of the shares in Turkcell Holding, which controlled 51% of Turkcell. Telia's partner was the Turkish company Cukurova. TeliaSonera and Cukurova agreed on a binding shareholders' agreement in 2005, depriving Cukurova from the right to sell Turkcell shares without the prior consent of TeliaSonera, and with the latter company's right of first priority to buy eventual shares from Cukurova. However, Cukurova sold their shares to Alfa Group that same year. Through this US$3.5 bn purchase, Alfa Group exercised control of Turkcell's board of directors already from First quarter, 2006. In January 2007, a court of appeal in Geneva, Switzerland, ruled that Cukurova had violate the shareholder's agreement by selling their shares on to the Alfa Group. The court demanded Cukurova to see to it that the shares be transferred back and re-sold to TeliaSonera. A court of appeal in Vienna, Austria confirmed this ruling on 7 March 2008, and repeated the demand to enter into negotiations with Alfa Group over at transfer of the shares, but with no practical results. On 7 August 2009 the International Chamber of Commerce issued an award stating that Cukurova must deliver all the remaining shares in Turkcell Holding to TeliaSonera.

== Links to the Icelandic financial crisis ==
Alfa-Bank has a Luxembourg-registered subsidiary Alfa Finance Holdings. The company's document trail shows that Shapburg Limited was a shareholder of Alfa Finance Holdings. Shapburg Limited is an anonymous Luxembourg-registered company which has been suspected of controlling important Icelandic companies. The finding was reported in 2005.

== Sanctions ==
In December 2023 the EU sanctioned AlfaStrakhovanie Group.

== See also ==
- Interros
- Renova Group
- Sistema
- Severstal
