= LetterOne =

Investment company

Letterone Holdings S.A.
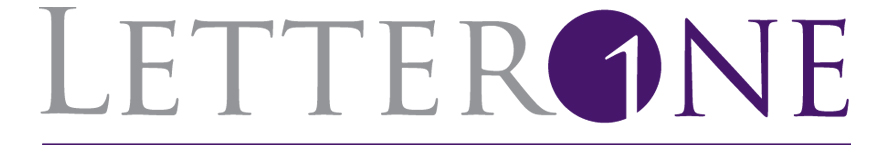
- Type: Private
- Industry: Investment management
- Founded: 2013; 13 years ago
- Founder: Mikhail Fridman
- Headquarters: Luxembourg
- Number of locations: Worldwide
- Key people: Jonathan Muir (CEO); Vitalij Farafonov (COO); Mervyn Davies (chairman)
- Products: Asset management
- Website: www.letterone.com

LetterOne Holdings S.A. (LetterOne) is an international investment business based in Luxembourg. With long-term investments in the telecoms, technology, healthcare, and energy sectors, the firm has four main units: L1 Health, L1 Technology, L1 Retail, and L1 Energy, all of which are supported by L1 Treasury Services, which manages the group's liquidity. LetterOne was set up LetterOne in 2013 as part of a broader new investment vehicle using the proceeds from the sale of TNK-BP. LetterOne had $26.8 billion in equity at the end of 2021. Co-founders Mikhail Fridman and Petr Aven stepped down from the company in early March 2022, after the EU imposed sanctions on them in the wake of the Russian invasion of Ukraine. The board now includes Mervyn Davies, Jonathan Muir, Franz Humer, Richard R. Burt, and Wulf von Schimmelmann, with Davies serving as chairman and Muir as CEO. Among major investments in 2023 were Turkcell, Qvantel, VEON, Wintershall Dea, DIA and Holland & Barrett.

== History and major assets ==
LetterOne was set up in 2013 as part of a broader new investment vehicle using the proceeds from the sale of TNK-BP. As of 31 December 2014 assets managed by LetterOne amounted to approximately $25 billion. The sources of these assets were funds from the sale of TNK-BP, but also from assets invested in prior to the L1 Group's formation. These include VimpelCom, Turkcell and private equity investments. By the start of 2014, LetterOne had announced plans to invest in global oil, gas, telecoms and technology sectors.

On 2 March 2015, Lord Browne was named executive chairman of L1 Energy, renouncing his other roles to focus on the newly formed oil and gas company. On 4 March 2015, the Secretary of State for Energy and Climate Change, Ed Davey, gave company co-founder Mikhail Fridman a one-week deadline to convince the UK government not to force him to sell the newly acquired North Sea oil and gas assets. A senior western oil executive said the UK was entering "uncharted territory" by intervening publicly in a corporate transaction over fears of the effect of future sanctions against Russia. In October 2015 LetterOne sold its North Sea oil fields to Ineos, the chemical company, for an undisclosed sum. The Financial Times has since reported that LetterOne has been told in a letter from a senior government official that the previous Energy Secretary's decision to require the sale of the North Sea fields "is not a judgement on the suitability of LetterOne’s owners to control these or any other assets in the UK". On 14 October 2015 LetterOne Group announced that it had agreed a deal to acquire German utility Eon’s interests in three producing Norwegian fields, located in the North Sea. Norway’s oil minister said that approval would be handled ‘in the usual way’. LetterOne's first annual LetterOne Rising Stars Jazz Award was awarded in 2017.

The firm's investment unit L1 Retail launched in December 2016. Working with a $3 billion fund focused on Europe sans Russia, the unit initially acquired Holland & Barrett, a healthcare retailer in the United Kingdom, in 2017 for £1.77 billion. LetterOne gained total control of Spanish retailer DIA in May 2019 when it acquired 70% of its shares, after having first bought 29% in 2017. Also in 2019, the firm's unit L1 Health acquired the pet heath platform Destination Pet and was a founding investor in K2 HealthVentures. After receiving regulatory approval in nine countries, LetterOne merged its oil and gas businesses into Wintershall Dea, a new European exploration and production company, in May 2019. LetterOne held 33% of the shares, with the rest owned by BASF. LetterOne invested £1 billion in the infrastructure company Upp in 2021, and also in 2021, L1 Health acquired Remedica, a pharmaceutical company in Cyprus. In October 2021, Browne left LetterOne as well as his chairmanship of Wintershell Dea. LetterOne had $26.8 billion in equity at the end of 2021, up from $22.3 billion the year prior. Among LetterOne's active investments in 2023 were the telecommunications companies Qvantel, Upp, and Turkcell, the energy company Wintershall Dea, the retail chains DIA and Holland & Barrett, the health companies DestinationPet and K2 HealthVentures, and the recycling company Plastic Energy. Also the largest shareholder in the telecommunications company VEON, in February 2022, LetterOne invested in H2scan Corporation, a California-based company that builds gas monitoring systems.

== Units and investment areas ==
As of 2023, the firm had four main business units: L1 Health, L1 Technology, L1 Retail, and L1 Energy, the latter of which is an oil and gas investment company formed by LetterOne in 2015. All four units are supported by L1 Treasury Services, which manages the group's liquidity and financial investments, including private equity holdings. All units are long-term investors taking either minority holdings or full ownership of portfolio companies. Apart from particular sectors, LetterOne participates in private equity funds such as those operated by Pamplona Capital Management, a specialist investment manager that provides an alternative investment platform across private equity, fund of hedge funds and single manager hedge fund investments. They manage assets for a variety of clients including public pension funds, international wealth managers, multinational corporations, family offices and funds of hedge funds.

== Key people ==
Jonathan Muir serves as LetterOne's chief executive officer (CEO), while Vitalij Farafonov serves as chief operating officer (COO).

=== Board of directors ===
The LetterOne board changed significantly in early 2022 after the start of the Russian invasion of Ukraine, with all co-founders leaving the company in March. Early that month, LetterOne froze the shareholdings of two EU sanctioned directors and co-founders, Mikhail Fridman and Petr Aven, and removed them from its board, leaving chairman Mervyn Davies in control of the firm. Despite "repeated calls" from various figures in British politics for Davies to step down in light of the sanctioned directors, Davies stayed with the firm and denounced the Russian invasion, stating he and the new board were "determined to ensure that the 120,000 jobs throughout the UK, US and Europe [funded by LetterOne were] protected." With Davies also making a point to the press of the sanctioned co-founders' "love and passion for" Ukraine and their Ukrainian heritage, the LetterOne board stated it would donate US$150 million to Ukrainian relief efforts. Although LetterOne itself was not sanctioned, Andrei Kosogov, Alexei Kuzmichev and German Khan all stepped down as directors later that month. Franz Humer was appointed to the board as a replacement in 2022.

The board of directors of the L1 Group is the company's highest decision making body and is responsible for setting the investment strategy and making investment decisions. In 2023, the five-member board of directors included:

- Mervyn Davies (Chairman)
- Jonathan Muir
- Franz Humer
- Richard R. Burt
- Wulf von Schimmelmann

== See also ==
- Indigo Era (economics)
