= German Khan =

Russian-Ukrainian businessman

- Герман Хан
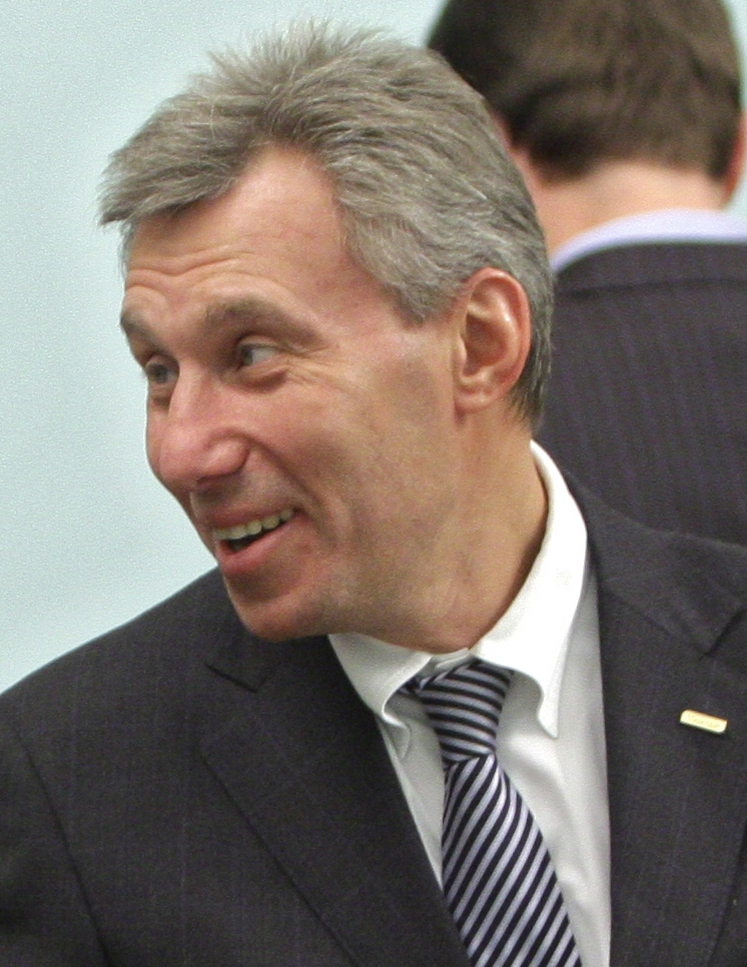
- Khan in 2010
- Born: German Borisovich Khan; 24 October 1961 (age 64); Kyiv, Ukraine, USSR
- Citizenship: Russian, Israeli
- Education: Moscow Institute of Steel and Alloys
- Occupations: Entrepreneur, business executive, philanthropist
- Known for: Co-founding Alfa Group, LetterOne, and L1 Energy
- Relatives: Alex Van der Zwaan (son-in-law)
- Website: https://germankhan.online/

German Borisovich Khan (Russian: Герман Борисович Хан; born 24 October 1961) is a Ukrainian-Israeli-Russian oligarch, billionaire, and businessman. After graduating from university in 1988 he worked in a wholesale business selling consumer items, before setting up his own cooperative. He was then appointed the head of the wholesale trade business Alfa Eco as part of the Alfa Group Consortium, by his college friend Mikhail Fridman. Alfa Group, which he also shares with another fellow billionaire and college peer, Alexei Kuzmichev, is the biggest financial and industrial investment group in Russia. He became president of Alfa Eco in 1996 and was instrumental in directing the company to focus on export and the oil trade. When Alfa bought Tyumen Oil (TNK) in 1997, he joined the board of directors. He was deputy chairman of TNK Oil Company from 1997 until 2003. In 2003, Khan worked with the other TNK owners to form a 50–50 joint venture with BP, in what was the largest foreign investment in Russia to date, at US$8 billion.

TNK-BP became Russia's third largest oil company. In 2013 TNK-BP was sold to Rosneft for US$56 billion, a sale described by Reuters as "one of the biggest energy takeovers in history." Khan joined Mikhail Fridman in establishing LetterOne, based in Luxembourg, for the purpose of investing some of the proceeds from the TNK-BP sale in international projects. LetterOne's L1 Energy fund was founded in 2013. Khan has donated funds to non-profits such as the European Jewish Fund, and co-founded and supports the Genesis Philanthropy Group.

== Early life and education ==
German Borisovich Khan was born on 24 October 1961 in Kyiv, Ukraine. The son of Ukrainian Jewish parents from Lviv, his father was a metallurgy professor. Khan had a keen interest in sports at a young age, and during high school he developed a long-term interest in boxing, citing the sport as an influence on building confidence and self-discipline. Khan graduated from high school in 1978 and subsequently worked for a year as an apprentice on a shop floor of a factory. He then studied mechanical engineering at the Kyiv-Pedagogical College, graduating in 1982. 1983 he enrolled in the Moscow Institute of Steel and Alloys (MISIS), where he specialised in the study of steel production. After graduating from college in 1988, Khan operated small businesses such as the clothing cooperative "Alexandrina" he founded with a partner, where he served as deputy chairman and handled supply chain and sales before its sale in 1990.

== Career ==
=== Alfa-Eco and TNK (1989–1990s) ===
After a chance meeting with businessman Mikhail Fridman, who had also been a student at MISIS, Khan was asked to head-up a wholesale trade business Alfa Eco as part of a wider company, Alfa Group Consortium. The company began by buying and selling a range of products including the purchase, upholstery and sale of carpets to domestic and then later, export markets. Khan took on a number of managerial positions within the company as it expanded into new areas, including head of the wholesale trade department, then head of the export department. Currently under the umbrella company Alfa Group Consortium, other divisions now include Alfa Capital Management, Rosvodokanal Group, AlfaStrakhovanie Group and A1 Group. It also holds interests in the telecommunications company Vimpelcom and Russia's biggest food retailer, X5 Group.

Khan held a number of managerial positions at Alfa Group starting in 1992. With Alfa-Eco restructured as the trading arm of the Alfa Group, Khan was Alfa-Eco's head of trade operations until 1996 and its director of commodity trading from 1995 to 1998. He became president in 1996, where for his two-year tenure he was instrumental in directing the company to focus on export and the oil trade. The company started by purchasing crude, securing contracts with refiners to process it, and then selling the refined product. In 1997, Alfa Group Consortium together with Access Industries and Renova Group acquired the state-owned TNK Oil Company (Tyumen Oil Company). Alfa Group purchased 40% of TNK's shares. When Alfa bought Tyumen Oil (TNK), he joined the board and remained involved in M&A deals. Khan was appointed deputy chairman of the management board of TNK in 2000, retaining the role until 2003.

=== TNK-BP leadership (2003–2013) ===
In 2003, Alfa Group sold exactly half of TNK to BP for US$6.15 billion, in what was the biggest foreign investment in Russia to date equivalent to $8 billion in invested assets. The deal resulted in the formation of the oil company TNK-BP, with half of the joint venture owned by BP, and the other 50 percent owned by the Alfa Group together with billionaire partners Viktor Vekselberg, and Leonard Blavatnik. From 2003 to 2013, Khan was executive director of TNK-BP Management (now called TNK-BP Holding), and a member of the management board. While managing TNK-BP, Khan remained involved with the Alfa Group at large. Alfa Group bought a stake in Turkcell in 2005, and by April 2007, Alfa Group controlled a 43.5% stake in Kyivstar, a Ukrainian telecom company.

During Khan's tenure as a TNK-BP executive director, TNK-BP became Russia's third largest oil company and globally a top ten private oil producer. Without a majority stakeholder in the company to dictate choices, by 2008, BP executives were in conflict with AAR over TNK-BP's strategy to internationalise the business. After several ongoing lawsuits, issues between AAR and BP were compounded in 2010, after Khan and Fridman resisted BP's push to do business with the state-owned oil company Rosneft in Russia, contrary to their shareholder agreement. By 2011, Khan's net worth was estimated at $9.6 billion, which placed him at 92 on the Forbes billionaires list, also ranking him as the thirteenth wealthiest person in Russia. Khan was appointed executive director of TNK-BP Ltd. in January 2011.

=== Founding LetterOne and L1 Energy (2013–2015) ===
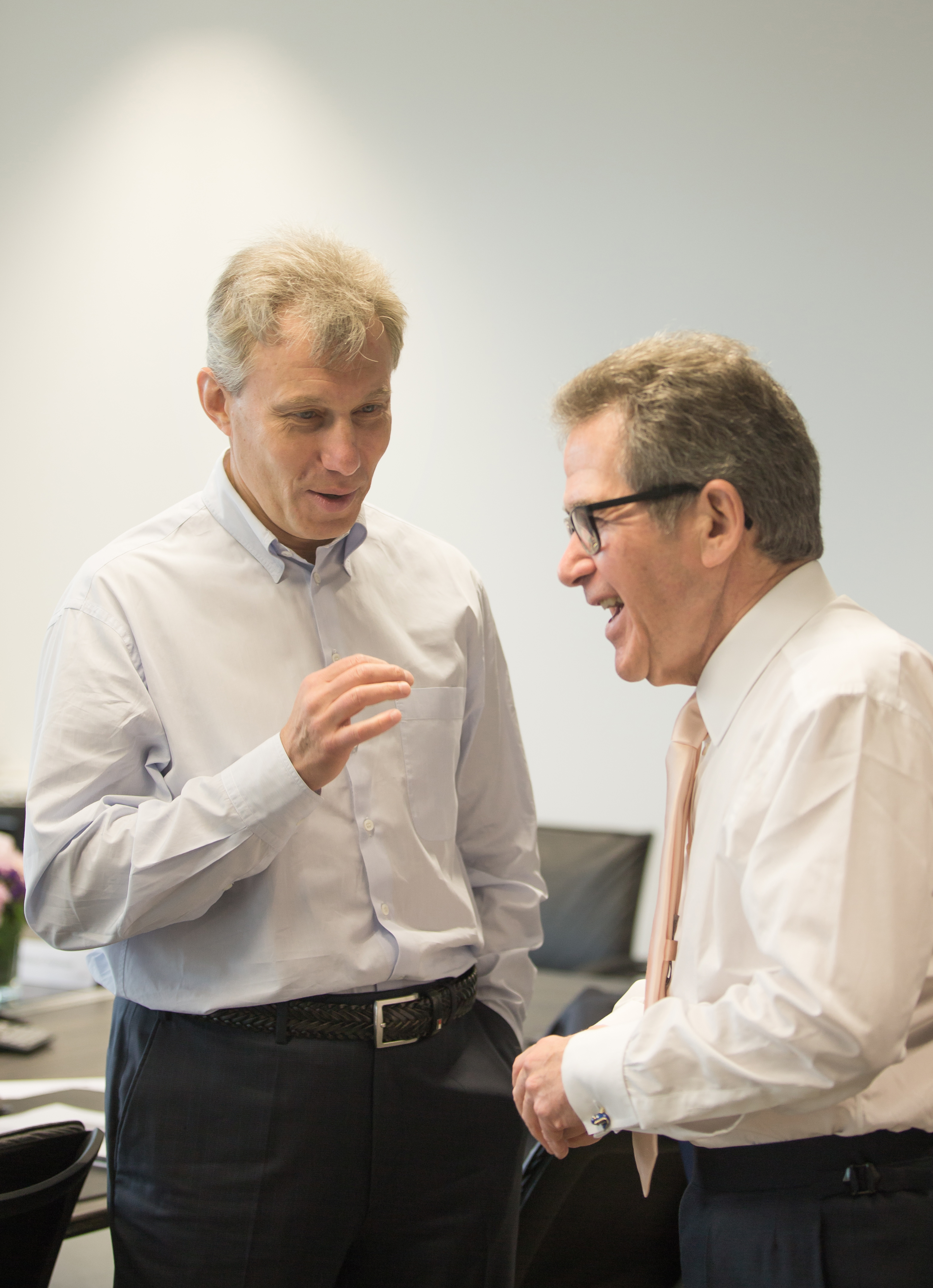
German Khan and L1 Energy colleague Lord Browne in 2016.

In July 2012, TNK-BP was sold to the state-owned Rosneft for $56 billion, a process which was still underway by early 2013. Reuters described it as "one of the biggest energy takeovers in history," with the overall deal worth $55 billion. Khan officially left TNK-BP in March 2013 after Alfa Group sold its 50% stake in TNK-BP to Rosneft for $28 billion. Khan earned around $3.3 billion in the deal. Using the $14 billion raised from selling their stakes in TNK-BP, Khan joined Mickhail Fridman in establishing LetterOne (L1), based in Luxembourg, for the purpose of investing the proceeds from the sale of TNK-BP in international projects.

LetterOne's L1 Energy was founded in 2013 with Lord Browne, former CEO of BP, James Hackett of Anadarko Petroleum and Andrew Gould of BG joining L1 Energy Advisory Board. The 2014 downturn in the oil industry and the falling ruble value in Russia led to Khan losing about 22% of his estimated value in 2014, or about $2.5 billion in one year. By that point, his overall value was estimated at £6.3 billion. The market afterwards improved, and Alfa Group's assets equaled around $40 billion by March 2015. On 2 March 2015 Lord Browne was appointed chairman of L1 Energy. L1 Energy officially launched as a company in May 2015 in the Neue Galerie New York. The company outlined an ambition to acquire and then develop a portfolio of two or three regionally focused platforms around the world. On 7 May 2015 Lord Davies was appointed deputy non-executive chairman of LetterOne, and a week later, former Swedish Foreign Minister Carl Bildt was appointed as the board's advisor.

=== North Sea assets, L1 divisions (2015–2016) ===
On 3 March 2015, L1 Energy purchased 100% of DEA, an international exploration and production company owned by the German utility RWE, for US$7 billion (€5.1 billion). RWE DEA had total natural gas production output of 2.6bn cubic metres in 2013. The deal was approved by Germany and seven other national and supranational authorities, including the European Union and Ukraine. Despite this, the L1 purchase of RWE DEA was opposed by UK Energy and Climate Change Secretary Ed Davey, who "raised concerns" that sanctions might "force L1 Energy to shut down production in the North Sea, imperiling oil supplies" and 5% of Britain's North Sea natural gas output.

DEA sold its North Sea oil fields to Ineos, the chemical company owned by Jim Ratcliffe, for an undisclosed sum in October 2015. At the time, the British government assured LetterOne that the forced sale of DEA's UK assets was "not a judgement on the suitability of LetterOne’s owners to control these or any other assets in the UK." On 14 October 2015, LetterOne Group announced that it had agreed a deal to acquire German utility E.ON's interests in three producing Norwegian fields, all located in the Norwegian Continental Shelf. Norway's oil minister supported the deal and said that approval would be handled "in the usual way." As of 2016, Khan retains positions on the supervisory board at both Alfa Group Consortium and Alfa Group. He is also a director at Alfa Finance Holdings SA, Alfa Bank ABH Holdings S.A., LetterOne Holdings S.A., and the supervisory board of DEA Deutsche Erdoel AG, which was bought by L1 Energy in 2015. He ranked as the 128th richest person in Europe as of March 2016, with an estimated net value of US$8.7 billion.

=== Sanctions (2022) ===
Khan (along with Fridman and Kuzmichev) was sanctioned by the EU and UK in February and March 2022 as part of an extensive package of sanctions against Russian officials and oligarchs imposed in response to the 2022 Russian Invasion of Ukraine. Khan stepped down from the LetterOne board in March. In April Alfa Bank was hit with sanctions by the U.S.

In June 2025, the EU General Court rejected delisting applications by Alfa-Bank JSC and German Khan, affirming the legality of the criteria used to include them on the EU sanctions list.

In January 2025, the UK Court of Appeal dismissed Anzhelika Khan’s appeal attempting to overturn UK sanctions imposed on her in April 2022. The court upheld that her designation on the basis of financial benefit from German Khan and marital association was rationally connected to the sanctions regime’s objectives.

== Philanthropy ==
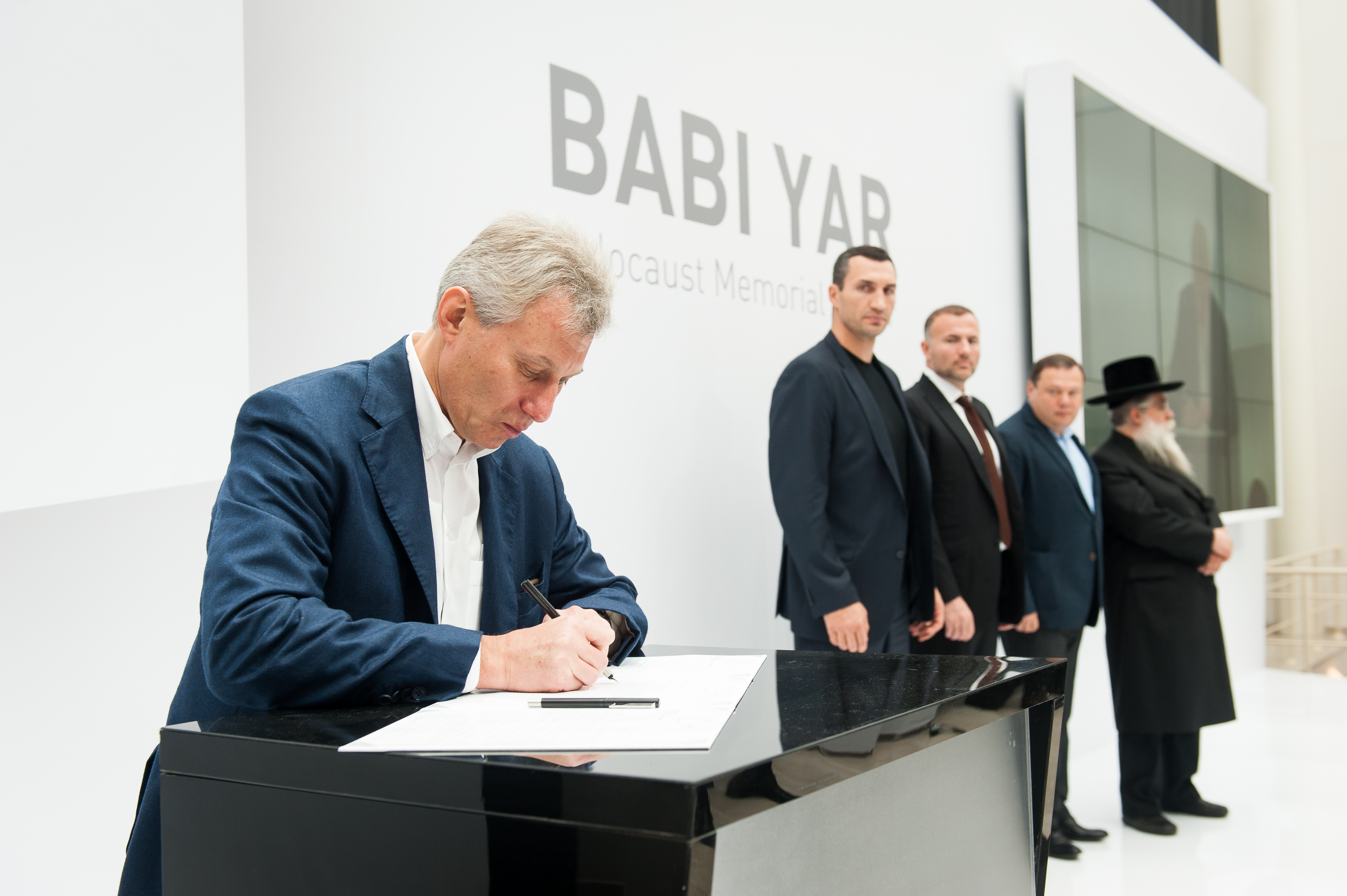
Khan (in forefront) at the commemoration of the Babi Yar Holocaust Memorial Center at Babi Yar, Ukraine in 2016.

Khan is an active supporter of the Life Line charitable programme, which provides medicine and surgery for seriously ill children in Russia. Since its founding in 2008, the program claims that 8334 children have been saved as a result of their work. Khan is a supporter of Jewish initiatives in Russia and elsewhere in Europe. An active member of the Russian Jewish Congress, Khan regularly contributes to the European Jewish Fund, a non-profit organization aimed at developing European Jewry and promoting tolerance and reconciliation. Khan along with Stan Polovets, Mikhail Fridman, Pyotr Aven, and Alexander Knaster founded the Genesis Philanthropy Group in 2011, whose purpose is to develop and enhance Jewish identity among Jews worldwide. In September 2016, it was announced that he was a member of an initiative to create a Holocaust memorial at Babi Yar in Ukraine. The Initiative Group of the Babi Yar Holocaust Memorial Center also included his long-term colleague Fridman.

== Legal ==
In May 2017 Khan, along with fellow Alfa-Bank owners Mikhail Fridman and Petr Aven, filed a defamation lawsuit against BuzzFeed for publishing the unverified Steele dossier, which alleges financial ties and collusion between Putin, Trump, and the three bank owners. In October 2017 Khan, Fridman, and Aven also filed a libel suit against the private-investigation firm Fusion GPS and its founder Glenn Simpson, who had commissioned former MI6 agent Christopher Steele to compile the dossier, for circulating the dossier among journalists and allowing it to be published. In April 2018 Khan, Fridman, and Aven filed a libel suit against Steele in the Superior Court of the District of Columbia, but the suit was dismissed with prejudice the following August.

Khan is one of many Russian "oligarchs" named in the Countering America's Adversaries Through Sanctions Act, CAATSA, signed into law by President Donald Trump in 2017.

== Personal life ==
Khan has both Russian and Israeli citizenship. He and his wife Angelika have five children together, Jakob, Eleanora, Eva and Jake. and live in London and Moscow. In 2010, Khan purchased a home on Eaton Square in London. Khan remains active with sports, for example participating in endurance, off-road, and rally driving competitions. He enjoys hunting and has a collection of sporting guns and rifles. According to WikiLeaks leaked US diplomatic cables, he was alleged in the past by other businesspeople to have carried handguns to business meetings in Russia. Khan also owns a villa in Monte Argentario, a coastal area in Tuscany.

Khan is the father-in-law of Alex van der Zwaan who, on 20 February 2018, pleaded guilty to charges raised by the investigation into Russian interference in the 2016 United States elections. Van der Zwaan was charged with lying to the FBI about his contacts with Rick Gates, and pleaded guilty to one count of making a false statement to investigators. On 3 April 2018, he was sentenced to 30 days in prison and fined $20,000.

== See also ==
- List of Russian billionaires
- List of Russian people by net worth
- Russian oligarchs
- History of the Jews in Ukraine
- Energy in Russia
