= Globe One Digital =

Globe One Ltd
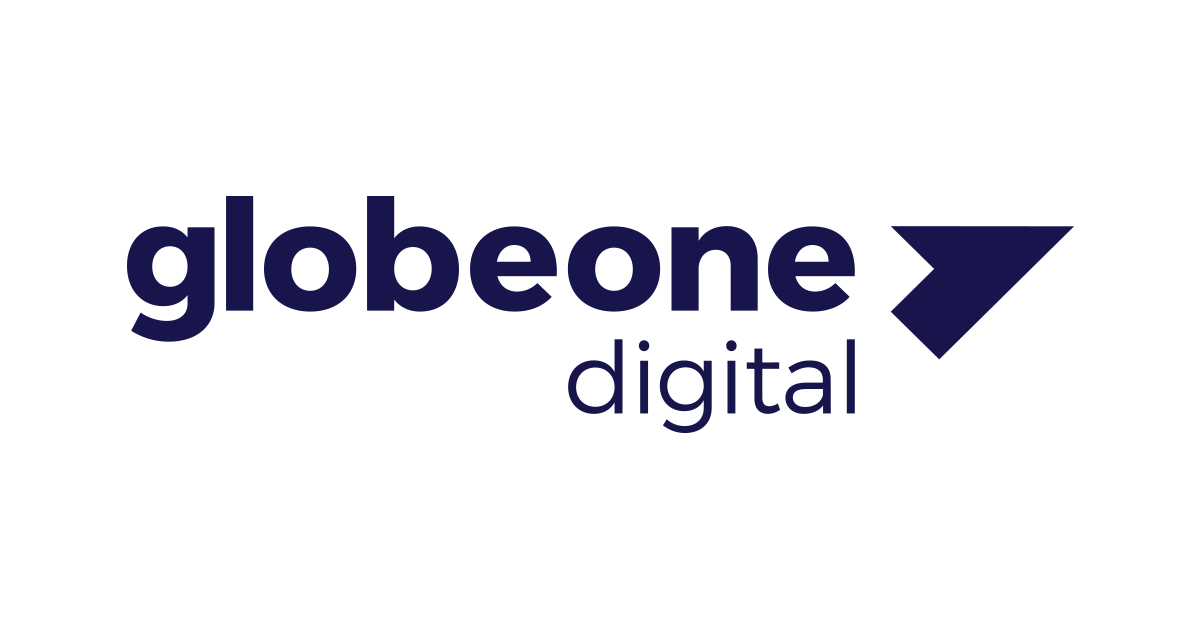
- Industry: Digital Marketing Performance Agency
- Founded: 1997
- Founder: Dimitris K. Papoutsis
- Headquarters: Athens, Greece
- Services: CRO, Display Advertising, Google Ads, Mobile Services, PPC Advertising, Search Engine Optimization, Social Media Marketing, Website Design, Website Development
- Website: globeonedigital.com

Globe One Digital is a European digital marketing agency, founded in 1997 by Dimitris K. Papoutsis and headquartered in Athens, providing online marketing strategies and services.

== Overview ==
Globe One Digital implements strategies in digital marketing performance applied by the use of search engines and digital technologies (SEO & SEM) and specializes in Search Engine Marketing (Google Ads, SEO), Social Media Marketing, PPC Advertising, CRO, Website Design and Development, Mobile Services and Travel Performance Marketing.

== History ==
Since it started operating (1997) Globe One Digital has developed digital marketing strategies and websites for clients like Stoiximan and Betano, Grecotel Hotels and Resorts, MediaMarkt, Travelive, Coca-Cola HBC, SWOT Hospitality Management Company, Zeus International, Allianz, Greek National Opera, Suzuki Bulgaria, Domino's Pizza Bulgaria.

In 2011, the agency became a Google Certified Partner and in 2013 it won its first award in Digital Marketing .

In 2014, Globe One Digital had five YouTube Masthead Blasts in a row. At the Google Travel Forum the vice president of Google Travel presented the global case study of AirFastTickets. In the same year, the agency became a Μember of GRECA and SETE. Also, in June 2014 it became a Member of IAB Hellas (Interactive Advertising Bureau).

In 2015, the agency became a Μember of EDEE.

In 2016, Globe One Digital ranked 81st on the “2016 Inc. 5000 Europe” list of fastest growing private companies in Europe, 1st in Greece and 5th in Europe, for Advertising & Marketing, with a growth rate of 853% in the previous three fiscal years. In the same year, the Globo PLC project became a LinkedIn global case study.

One year later (2017), the Greek agency expanded its business activity in Bulgaria and Romania and became a Member of Hellenic Business Council in Bulgaria (H.B.C.B.). In June 2023, Globe One Digital opened a new office on the island of Mykonos.

In 2020, Globe One Digital certified as "Google Digital Champion" in Smart Bidding for its digital marketing services and In 2022, was awarded 3 ISO (ISO 22301, ISO 27001, ISO 9001) Certifications by TÜV AUSTRIA Hellas.

In December 2022 Globe One Digital had become a signatory of the Diversity Charter Greece.

In February 2023 Globe One Digital has been named Google Premier Partner, ranking among the top 3% of participating companies in Greece and in April 2023, became the Grand Sponsor of Greek Tourism Awards 2023.

== Work ==
In 2014, the company begins to contribute to technological and artistic domestic events by participating and supporting them with sponsorships and initiatives. Also, Globe One Digital adopted and developed Corporate Social Responsibility strategies on behalf of non-profit organizations and institutions in Greece. As a first step, the agency began supporting the NGO “Smile of the Child” by conducting Google AdWords Campaigns to increase their digital presence and raise public awareness. In December 2022, Dimitris Papoutsis, CEO of Globe One Digital, participated in the First Open Dialogue “Act for the Future”, organized by EXELIXI ZOIS and held at Stavros Niarchos Foundation, and in April 2023, the company commenced its sponsorship of Antonis Papakonstantinou, a gold-medalist rowing champion.

Over the last decade, the agency has been awarded in Digital Marketing competitions held in Greece. During the period 2013 –2023, Globe One Digital won eleven Gold awards for its services and strategies in digital marketing, ten Silver and eleven Bronze. In 2021, company won the "Best Of The Decade - Top 10 Agency Of The Decade (e-volution awards 2011-2020)" in Greece awards and two years later in collaboration with Allianz Direct won 7 Growth Hacking Awards, including the "Most Awarded Growth Hacking Brand.
