= Lisa R. Cohen =

Television news magazine producer

- Education: University of Pennsylvania
- Occupations: Journalist, author

Lisa R. Cohen is an American-Canadian television news magazine producer, known for writing about the Etan Patz case.

== Early life ==
Cohen grew up in Winnipeg, Manitoba, and Philadelphia and graduated from the University of Pennsylvania with a degree in international relations and French.

== Career ==
At PrimeTime Live and then at 60 Minutes II, Cohen produced reports for Diane Sawyer, Sam Donaldson, Peter Jennings, Cynthia McFadden and others, on topics as diverse as the right to bear arms, have abortions and exercise the death penalty. She has covered some of the biggest moments in recent history including the TWA 800 crash, the Oklahoma City bombing, and the September 11 terror attacks. Her 1996 one-hour documentary for ABC News PrimeTime Live, Judgment at Midnight, won multiple awards, including the NATAS Emmy; CINE Golden Eagle; International Film and Television Award; and the Foundation of American Women in Radio and Television "Gracie" award.

Cohen first learned about the unsolved disappearance of Etan Patz while working at PrimeTime Live. She subsequently produced several pieces on the story for network television before writing her first book, After Etan: The Missing Child Case that Held America Captive, published by Grand Central Publishing on May 7, 2009. Patz was considered the most famous missing child since the Lindbergh baby after the streets of New York City were plastered with his missing posters. In the two years after his disappearance, the Atlanta child murders - during which the bodies of dozens of young boys and girls were discovered in lakes, marshes, and ponds along roadside trails - and the abduction and murder of 6-year-old Adam Walsh in Hollywood, Florida, galvanized a nationwide movement for child protection and safety. In 1983, President Ronald Reagan designated the date of Etan's disappearance, May 25, as National Missing Children's Day in the United States.

In 2010, Cohen began directing and producing Serving Life for the Oprah Winfrey Network, executive produced by Forest Whitaker. The documentary follows a group of inmates at Louisiana's Angola state penitentiary, who staff the inmate hospice there.

Cohen is also a media consultant, and she teaches journalism/television production at Columbia University Graduate School of Journalism.

She is a regular contributor to Women in Crime Ink, described by the Wall Street Journal as "a blog worth reading."
