= Dimitris K. Papoutsis =

Greek businessman (born 1973)

- Born: December 8, 1973 (age 52); Athens, Greece
- Education: American College of Greece, Athens
- Occupation: Businessman
- Years active: 1997-present
- Known for: CEO & Founder of Globe One Digital
- Children: 2

Dimitris K. Papoutsis (Greek: Δημήτρης Κ. Παπουτσής) is a Greek businessman involved in digital marketing and communication, data analytics, and business consultancy. He is the founder & CEO of Globe One Digital, stockholder in Symbol Media and the British startup Oggit and the founder of Consolytics, an online data consolidation platform.

== Life and career ==
Dimitris K. Papoutsis was born in Athens on December 8, 1973, to Konstantinos Papoutsis and Marousha Skiada. In 1997, after completing degrees in Marketing and Computer Information Systems in American College of Greece, Dimitris K. Papoutsis founded Globe One Digital in Athens. The introduction of internet services for domestic and business use in Greece in 1995, led Papoutsis to offer online marketing services, a concept that was beginning to gain traction in the country at that time. In 2009, he expanded into the online sports betting (iGaming) industry and, in 2014, began a business relationship with Kaizen Gaming, a global game technology company. Around the same period, he joined the travel industry and included online travel marketing services in his business activities.

In 2013, his company’s Media department was recognized as a Google Partner, and in 2023, it was designated as a Google Ads Premier Google Partner. In 2016, Globe One Digital was included as 81st on the 'Inc. 5000 Europe' list, ranking first in Greece and fifth in Europe for Advertising & Marketing. At the Tourism Megatrends Conference in 2017, Papoutsis spoke at the event on 'Digital Accommodation Performance Marketing', discussing the management of financial performance in online advertising for hotels through Revenue Performance Management (RPM). In 2018, during the first Google Marketing Conference in Athens, he presented the integration and process of Google Analytics real-time data into the “Consolytics” (Google Analytics Add-On) platform.

=== Business challenges ===
In the years leading up to the COVID-19 pandemic, Papoutsis attempted to sell his company to an international advertising group, but the pandemic disrupted these plans and required him to adjust his business strategy. In 2021, he acquired a 50% stake in the Bulgarian events and advertising agency Symbol Media, which later rose to 75% in 2024. In 2022, he became a shareholder in Oggit, a British startup specializing in Augmented Reality (AR) technology.

== CSR ==
In 2011, Dimitris Papoutsis entered a collaboration with The Smile of the Child, a Greek non-profit organization dedicated to children's rights and welfare. In December 2022, Papoutsis participated in the First Open Dialogue event titled "Act for the Future", organized by Exelixi Zois at the Stavros Niarchos Foundation, and a few months later, he provided support to Exelixi Zois’s programs aimed at assisting children in institutional care with their transition to autonomy. In April 2023, Globe One Digital provided sponsorship for Antonis Papakonstantinou, the bronze medalist at the 2024 Summer Olympics in Paris.
