= L1 Energy =

British oil and gas investment company

- Industry: Oil and gas
- Founded: 2015
- Headquarters: London, England
- Key people: Lord Browne, executive chairman
- Website: www.letterone.com/about-us

L1 Energy is an oil and gas investment company controlled by the Russian billionaire Mikhail Fridman, through Alfa Group, and chaired by Lord Browne.

On 2 March 2015, it was announced that Lord Browne was the executive chairman, and would be renouncing his other roles to build a major new oil and gas company from scratch.

L1 Energy will run DEA AG, the purchase of which was announced in March 2014 that DEA for €5.1 billion. L1 Energy will seek to build a global oil and gas company through the acquisition of platforms in Europe, North America and South East Asia.

== Advisory board ==
As of August 2023:

- Lord Davies of Abersoch, Non-Executive Chairman
- Jonathan Muir, Chief Executive
- Franz Humer Non-Executive Director
- Richard Burt, Non-Executive Director
- Wulf von Schimmelmann, Non-Executive Director
- Vitalij Farafonov, Chief Operating Officer
