= International Missing Children's Day =

World day

- Date: May 25th
- Next time: 25 May 2027
- Frequency: annual

International Missing Children's Day is an international day celebrated on May 25th, the same day as the United States' National Missing Children's Day designated by Ronald Reagan in 1983. It is a day dedicated to raising awareness about the issue of missing children, highlighting the efforts made to find and bring them back safely, and supporting the families affected by these tragedies.

== Background ==
It was started in 1998 as a joint venture of the International Centre for Missing & Exploited Children (ICMEC) and the US's National Center for Missing & Exploited Children (NCMEC).

In 2001, the tribute spread worldwide through the efforts of the International Centre for Missing & Exploited Children (ICMEC), European Commission, and Missing Children Europe.

Every year on May 25, Global Missing Children Network's members pay respects to International Missing Children's Day, honoring missing and abducted children while celebrating those who have been recovered. Following the 1979 disappearance of 6-year-old Etan Patz in New York City, May 25 was established as Missing Children's Day in the US by President Ronald Reagan in 1983. The Network has 29 member countries: Albania, Argentina, Australia, Belarus, Belgium, Brazil, Canada, Chile, Costa Rica, Ecuador, Germany, Greece, Guatemala, Ireland, Italy, Jamaica, Lithuania, Mexico, the Netherlands, New Zealand, Poland, Portugal, Russia, Serbia, South Korea, Spain, Taiwan, the United Kingdom, and the United States.

ICMEC coordinates the Help Bring Them Home Campaign in 29 countries, in conjunction with International Missing Children's Day, to spotlight the issue of child abduction around the world, and to suggest to parents some steps they can take to protect their children.

Missing Children Europe, a European federation with 32 members working for missing and sexually exploited children, publishes a report every year on International Missing Children's Day, analyzing data and statistics from hotlines for missing children across Europe to better understand the challenges and safeguard children from going missing.

== See also ==
- International child abduction
- International child abduction in Japan
- International child abduction in Mexico
- Refugee children
- Street children
