= Andrei Kosogov =

Russian businessman (born 1961)

- Андрей Косогов
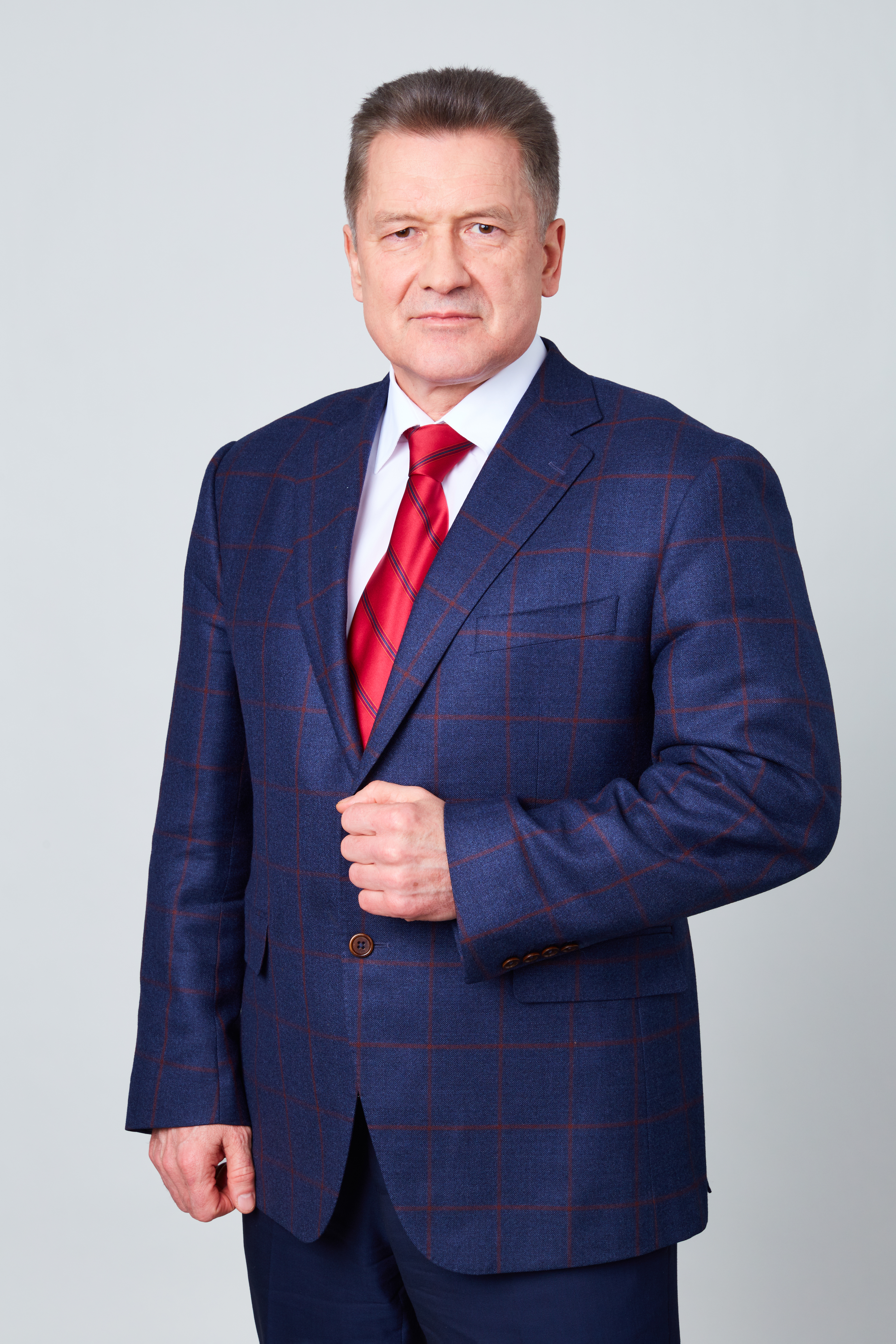
- Kosogov in 2022
- Born: 15 March 1961 (age 65); Estonia
- Occupation: Businessman
- Known for: Alfa Group, LetterOne
- Spouse: Married
- Children: Two

Andrei Kosogov (born 15 March 1961) is a Russian businessman. He is a co-founder of the international investment firm LetterOne.

== Education ==
Kosogov graduated from the Moscow Power Engineering Institute in 1987 with a Bachelor of Science in Engineering degree and began working at a small firm founded with the institute's help. He also has an MBA from Harvard Business School.

== Career ==
Kosogov is a member of the Board of Directors of LetterOne Group. He currently holds various positions at Alfa Group Consortium including as a member of the Supervisory Board. From November 2005 through June 2009, he was Chairman of the Supervisory Board of Alfa-Bank Ukraine. From November 2005 to April 2011 he was Chairman of the Board of Directors of Alfa Asset Management. He is Chairman of the Board of Altimo, the telecom subsidiary of Alfa Group, where he is responsible in overseeing the cell network operator VimpelCom, one of the world's largest integrated telecommunications companies, in which LetterOne Group owns a majority equity stake.

== Philanthropy ==
Kosogov received Russia's Medal of Honour for charitable work related to childhood mental and neurological illnesses.
