= Alex van der Zwaan =

Dutch attorney (born 1984)

- Born: September 1984 (age 42); Brussels, Belgium
- Citizenship: Dutch
- Education: King's College London (LLB); BPP University (LPC)
- Occupation: Attorney (Disbarred)
- Employer: Skadden, Arps, Slate, Meagher & Flom (2007–2017)
- Criminal charge: Making false statements
- Criminal penalty: 30 days in federal prison; $20,000 fine; 2 months supervised release
- Criminal status: Pardoned by Donald Trump; served sentence at FCI Allenwood Low, #35255-016; subsequently deported
- Spouse: Eva Khan (m. 2017)
- Relatives: German Khan (father-in-law)

Alex Rolf van der Zwaan (Dutch: [ˈaːlɛks fɑn dər ˈzʋaːn]; (Note: In isolation, van is pronounced [vɑn].) born September 1984) is a Belgian-born Dutch attorney formerly with the London branch of New York–based international law firm Skadden, Arps, Slate, Meagher & Flom.

On 20 February 2018, he pleaded guilty to one count of making a false statement to investigators while answering questions about Russian interference in the 2016 United States elections. He served 30 days in prison and was fined $20,000. After serving his sentence, Van der Zwaan was deported to the Netherlands. He was later pardoned in December 2020 by U.S. President Donald Trump.

The Ukrainian Ministry of Justice was his firm's client and central to the indictment. In 2017, Skadden Arps refunded $567,000 billed by the firm to the Government of Ukraine.

== Education and career ==
Van der Zwaan, a Dutch citizen, was born in Brussels, Belgium, in 1984. He received his LL.B. at King's College London in 2006, and completing his Legal Practice Course at BPP Law School in 2007. He was admitted to practice law as a solicitor in England and Wales in September 2009.

He began working at the London office of the international law firm Skadden, Arps, Slate, Meagher & Flom in 2007. At the firm, he worked on complex matters, including the freezing of assets of the rich, a legal tactic attempted by companies and billionaires in disputes with business partners. He repeatedly assisted Ukrainian oligarch Gennadiy Bogolyubov, whose assets were at risk of being frozen by the London High Court on several occasions.

His work at the firm also included representing corporations, individuals and sovereign entities in various matters, including high-value and complex commercial litigation and arbitration, and government agency investigations. He assisted Russian oligarch Roman Abramovich's businesses in relation to mining assets in Ukraine.

In November 2017, Van der Zwaan was fired from Skadden Arps for gross misconduct due to the false statements he made to the United States Special Counsel's Office. On 3 July 2019, Van der Zwaan was struck off the Roll of Solicitors in England and Wales following a judgment of the Solicitors Disciplinary Tribunal that he had acted dishonestly by knowingly and intentionally giving the Special Counsel's Office false information.

== Work on Skadden Arps' Ukrainian report, and criminal conviction ==
December 2020 pardon granted by Donald Trump

Van der Zwaan, who speaks Russian, was one of the eight attorneys who worked on Skadden Arps's 2012 report, commissioned by the government of Ukrainian President Viktor Yanukovych via Paul Manafort, that defended the prosecution, conviction and imprisonment of Yanukovych's rival, the country's former prime minister Yulia Tymoshenko. Van der Zwaan worked closely with Gregory B. Craig in preparing the report, assisting with fact-finding and attending meetings in Ukraine. He also served as rule-of-law consultant to the Ministry of Justice of Ukraine. In a 2017 interview former United States ambassador to Ukraine John E. Herbst said that Skadden Arps "should have been ashamed" of the report, calling it "a nasty piece of work".

In February 2018, Special Counsel investigation prosecutor Andrew Weissmann stated that, as part of Manafort's and Rick Gates's lobbying effort to improve Yanukovych's reputation in the United States, Van der Zwaan took an advance copy of the report in late July or early August 2012 without authorization, and gave it to a public-relations firm working for the Ukrainian Ministry of Justice—with one aim being to get the report published in The New York Times—and in September 2012 gave Gates talking points about the report. Prosecutors also said Van der Zwaan deleted emails sought by the special counsel's office—such as emails between him and Manafort associate Konstantin Kilimnik (known as "Person A"), including one requesting that Van der Zwaan use encrypted communications and one from September 2016—rather than turning them over to Skadden Arps, which was gathering documents for the special counsel.

In a 3 November 2017 interview with Special Counsel prosecutors and FBI agents, Van der Zwaan maintained that his last communication with Gates was an innocuous text in mid-August 2016 and that his last contact with Kilimnik was a 2014 discussion of the latter's family; prosecutors determined instead that he had discussed the 2012 Skadden Arps report with Gates and Kilimnik in September 2016 during phone calls that he surreptitiously recorded. Van der Zwaan acknowledged to Special Counsel investigators in an interview that Gates had told him of Kilimnik's ties to the Main Intelligence Directorate (GRU), a Russian military intelligence agency.

On 20 February 2018, Van der Zwaan pleaded guilty to one count of making a false statement to investigators. In his plea, he admitted to email deletions, and to lying when he told investigators that he had only a "passive role in the rollout of the report". The guilty plea did not include an agreement to cooperate with the Mueller investigation.

At his sentencing hearing on 3 April 2018, he was sentenced to 30 days in prison followed by two months of supervised release, and fined $20,000.

He was disbarred by the United Kingdom's Solicitors Disciplinary Tribunal on 11 July 2019.

In December 2020, U.S. President Donald Trump pardoned Van der Zwaan in an eleventh-hour pardon prior to the end of Trump's four-year presidential term. The pardon rescinds his U.S. criminal record, allowing him to legally return to the United States.

== Personal life ==
As of 2018, Van der Zwaan lives in London. In June 2017, he married Eva Khan, daughter of the Russian billionaire German Khan, co-founder and co-owner of Alfa Group. German Khan is suing BuzzFeed and the private investigation firm Fusion GPS over BuzzFeed's publication of the Steele dossier containing information about Trump's ties to Russia. Van der Zwaan has Russian roots and has worked with a number of Russian oligarchs. In addition to Dutch, he speaks fluent English, Russian, and French.

== See also ==
- Mueller Report
