= Disappearance of Etan Patz =

1979 missing-person case

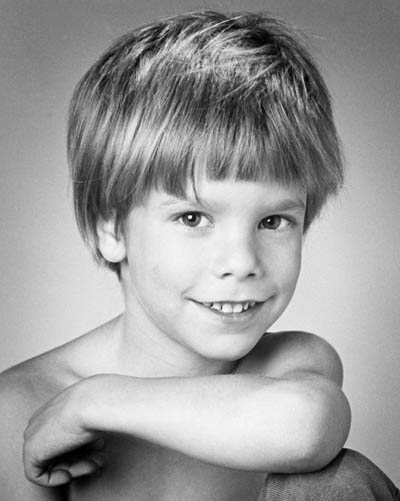
- Etan Patz on September 16, 1978
- Date: May 25, 1979; 47 years ago
- Location: New York City, U.S.
- Type: Disappearance, presumed child murder, presumed child abduction
- Motive: Unclear, allegedly sexual
- Deaths: Etan Kalil Patz (presumed)
- Accused: Jose Ramos (formerly accused in civil case)
- Convicted: Pedro Hernandez
- Verdict: Hung jury (Note: 11-1 in favor of guilty verdict) (2015; first trial); Guilty on both counts (2017; second trial); Conviction overturned (2025; on federal appeal); Conviction reinstated (2026; by U.S. Supreme Court)
- Convictions: Second-degree murder, first-degree kidnapping
- Sentence: Life in prison with the possibility of parole after 25 years
- Litigation: Ramos found liable by default in 2005 wrongful death lawsuit by Patz's parents; ordered to pay $2.7 million: Overturned at request of Patz's parents in 2016

Etan Kalil Patz (/ˈeɪtɑːn ˈpeɪts/; October 9, 1972 – c. May 25, 1979) was a six-year-old American boy who disappeared on May 25, 1979, on his way to his school bus stop in the SoHo neighborhood of Lower Manhattan. His disappearance helped launch the missing children movement, which included new legislation and new methods for tracking down missing children. Years after he disappeared, Patz became one of the first children to be profiled on the "photo on a milk carton" campaigns of the 1980s. In 1983, President Ronald Reagan designated May 25—the anniversary of Etan's disappearance—as National Missing Children's Day in the United States. Etan's body has never been found, and he was declared legally dead on June 19, 2001.

In 2012, Pedro Hernandez was indicted on charges of second-degree murder and first-degree kidnapping. After a mistrial and retrial, on February 14, 2017, after nine days of deliberations, the jury found Hernandez guilty of murder and kidnapping. Hernandez was sentenced to 25-years-to-life in prison on April 18, 2017. On July 21, 2025, Hernandez's conviction was overturned by a federal appeals panel ruling that the state trial court's instructions to the jury were erroneous. On November 25, 2025, the Manhattan District Attorney's office announced that Hernandez would be retried. On June 22, 2026, the U.S. Supreme Court, in a 6–3 unsigned opinion, reinstated Hernandez’s conviction, ruling that the federal appeals court had exceeded its authority in overturning it.

== Disappearance ==
On the morning of May 25, 1979, Etan left his parents’ SoHo apartment at 113 Prince Street by himself for the first time to walk a block and a half to board a school bus at West Broadway and Prince Street. He was wearing a black "Future Flight Captain" pilot cap, a blue corduroy jacket, blue jeans and blue sneakers with fluorescent stripes. Etan never got on the school bus that morning, and his teacher noticed his absence at school. When Etan did not return home after school, his mother contacted the mother of his closest friend, and then the police.

At first, detectives considered the Patzes to be possible suspects but quickly determined they had no involvement. An intense search began that evening, using nearly 100 police officers and a team of bloodhounds. The search continued for weeks. Neighbors and police canvassed the city and placed missing-child posters featuring Etan's portrait, but this resulted in few leads.

Etan's father Stanley was a professional photographer and had a collection of photographs he had taken of his son. His photos of Etan were printed on countless missing-child posters and milk cartons. They were also projected on screens in Times Square.

== Accusations against Jose Ramos ==
Assistant United States Attorney Stuart R. GraBois received the case in 1985 and identified Jose Antonio Ramos, a convicted child sexual abuser who had a relationship with a woman the Patzs had hired to walk Etan home from school as the primary suspect. In 1982, multiple boys had accused Ramos of trying to lure them into a drain pipe in the area where Ramos was living. When police searched the drain pipe, they found photographs of Ramos and young boys who resembled Etan. GraBois eventually found out that Ramos had been in custody in Pennsylvania in connection with an unrelated child molestation case.

In 1990, GraBois was deputized as a deputy state attorney general in Pennsylvania to help prosecute a case against Ramos for sexually abusing children and to obtain further information about Etan's case. When first questioned by GraBois, Ramos stated that, on the day when Etan disappeared, he had taken a young boy back to his apartment to rape him. Ramos said that he was "90 percent sure" it was the boy whom he later saw on television. However, Ramos did not use Etan's name. He also claimed he had put the boy on a subway going uptown.

In 1991, while Ramos was incarcerated, a jailhouse informant told GraBois and FBI agent Mary Galligan that Ramos had told him he knew what had happened to Etan. Ramos even drew a map of Etan's school bus route, indicating that he knew that Etan's bus stop was the third one on the route. In a special feature on missing children, the New York Post reported on October 21, 1999, that Ramos was the prime suspect in Etan's disappearance. Ramos had been known by the Patz family and was the prime suspect all along, but in the early 1980s authorities were unable to prosecute Ramos.

Stan and Julie Patz filed a lawsuit against Ramos in New York state court for wrongful death, but Ramos refused to answer questions under oath. In 2004, the court entered a judgment in favor of the Patzes and awarded them $2 million in damages, which they were never able to collect. Ramos has never been criminally prosecuted for the murder of Etan. Every year, on Etan's birthday and the anniversary of his disappearance, Stan Patz sent Ramos a copy of his son's missing-child poster. On the back, he typed the same message: "What did you do to my little boy?"

Ramos has denied that he killed Etan. Ramos served a 20-year prison sentence in the State Correctional Institution in Dallas, Pennsylvania, for child molestation. He was released from prison on November 7, 2012. Soon after his release he was arrested on a Megan's Law violation. Ramos died at the age of 82 while he was hospitalized at Bellevue Hospital in Manhattan on March 7, 2026.

Stan and Julie Patz had the 2004 judgment against Ramos dismissed after the 2015 trial of Pedro Hernandez convinced them that Ramos was not responsible for their son's death.

== Case reopened ==
Manhattan district attorney Cyrus Vance, Jr. officially reopened the case on May 25, 2010. On April 19, 2012, Federal Bureau of Investigation (FBI) and New York City Police Department (NYPD) investigators began excavating the SoHo basement of 127-B Prince Street, near the Patz home. This residence had been newly refurbished shortly after Etan's disappearance in 1979, and the basement had been the workshop and storage space of a handyman. After a four-day search, investigators announced that there was "nothing conclusive found."

=== Confession ===
On May 24, 2012, New York police commissioner Raymond Kelly announced that a man was in custody who had implicated himself in Etan's disappearance. A law enforcement official identified the man as 51-year-old Pedro Hernandez of Maple Shade, New Jersey, and said that Hernandez had confessed to strangling the child. Hernandez stated in his written confession to police, "I'm sorry, I shoke [sic] him." According to a 2009 book about the case, After Etan, Etan had a dollar and had told his parents that he planned to buy a soda to drink with his lunch. At the time of Etan's disappearance, Hernandez was an 18-year-old convenience store worker in a neighborhood bodega. Hernandez said that he later threw Etan's remains into the garbage. Hernandez was charged with second-degree murder. According to a New York Times report from May 25, 2012, the police at that time had no physical evidence to corroborate his confession.

=== Corroborating evidence ===
In 2012, Jose Lopez, a man from New Jersey, reached out to investigators because he believed that Hernandez, Lopez's brother-in-law, was responsible for Etan's disappearance. Statements by Hernandez's sister, Nina Hernandez, and Tomas Rivera, leader of a Charismatic Christianity group at St. Anthony of Padua, a Roman Catholic church in Camden, New Jersey, indicated that Hernandez may have publicly confessed in the presence of fellow parishioners in the early 1980s to having murdered Etan. According to Hernandez's sister, it was an "open family secret that he had confessed in the church."

A New York grand jury indicted Hernandez on November 14, 2012, on charges of second-degree murder and first-degree kidnapping. His lawyer has stated that Hernandez was diagnosed with schizotypal personality disorder, which includes hallucinations. The lawyer has also said that Hernandez has a low intelligence quotient (IQ) of around 70, "at the border of intellectual disability."

=== Trials and conviction ===
On December 12, 2012, Hernandez pled not guilty to two counts of murder and one count of kidnapping in a New York court. In April 2013, Harvey Fishbein, Hernandez's legal-aid criminal-defense lawyer, filed a motion to dismiss the case, citing that Hernandez's "confession in one of the nation's most notorious child disappearances was false, peppered with questionable claims and made after almost seven hours of police questioning." The next month, New York Supreme Court Judge Maxwell Wiley ruled that the evidence was "legally sufficient to support the charges" and that the case could move forward. He also ordered a hearing to determine whether the defendant's statements could be used at trial.

A September 2014 hearing was conducted to determine whether Hernandez's statements that were made before the police had read the Miranda rights to him were legally admissible at trial. This would be influenced by whether he felt free to leave during the time before which he was Mirandized. The hearing also sought to determine whether Hernandez understood the significance of his Miranda rights and was competent to waive them when he did so. This was significant because it would decide whether any statements made after that point by Hernandez were legally admissible at trial. The actual truth or falsehood of the statements was not the focus of the hearing; rather, the question of the statements' truthfulness was to be discussed at trial, which began on January 5, 2015.

The case resulted in a mistrial in May 2015 because of a hung jury that was deadlocked 11 for conviction and 1 against conviction. A retrial began on October 19, 2016, in a New York City court, with jury deliberations in February 2017. On February 14, Hernandez was found guilty of kidnapping and felony murder. Hernandez faced 25 years to life in prison. Sentencing was delayed to allow his attorneys to challenge the verdict. On April 18, he was sentenced to life in prison with the possibility of parole after serving at least 25 years. The conviction was unanimously affirmed by the appellate court on March 26, 2020.

On July 21, 2025, a federal appellate court reversed the conviction and said Hernandez was entitled to a new trial or else to be released from prison. On November 25, Manhattan DA Alvin Bragg, who had been given until December 1 to decide whether to retry Hernandez, agreed to retry him. The trial was supposed to begin by June 1, 2026. Hernandez's lawyers attempted to have the charges dismissed, arguing that a fair trial was impossible due to media coverage, and that prosecutors had waited too long to charge Hernandez. Judge Michele Rodney refused to dismiss the case on April 17, 2026. On June 22, 2026, the U.S. Supreme Court reinstated Hernandez’s conviction by a 6–3 vote, with the three liberal justices dissenting. In an unsigned opinion, the court held that the Second Circuit had exceeded its authority under the Antiterrorism and Effective Death Penalty Act of 1996, which limits federal court review of state criminal convictions.

== Aftermath ==
Etan Patz's parents Julie and Stanley in 1985

In 1983, the May 25 anniversary of Etan Patz's disappearance was designated National Missing Children's Day in the United States. In 2001, the tribute spread worldwide. The International Centre for Missing & Exploited Children (ICMEC) coordinates the "Help Bring Them Home" campaign in 22 countries in conjunction with International Missing Children's Day.

The extensive media attention attracted by the case of Patz's disappearance has been credited with increasing public awareness of the problem of child abduction. As a result, fewer parents are willing to allow their children to walk to school, photos of missing children have been more widely distributed (for example, on milk cartons) and the concept of "stranger danger" has been promoted, the idea that all adults not known to the child should be regarded as potential sources of danger.

Etan's parents remained in the family home and kept the same phone number until 2019, when they relocated to Hawaii, which their younger son had moved to some years earlier.

== See also ==
- Crime in New York City
- List of murder convictions without a body
- List of solved missing person cases (1970s)
