= Victor Halberstadt =

Dutch economist (1939–2024)

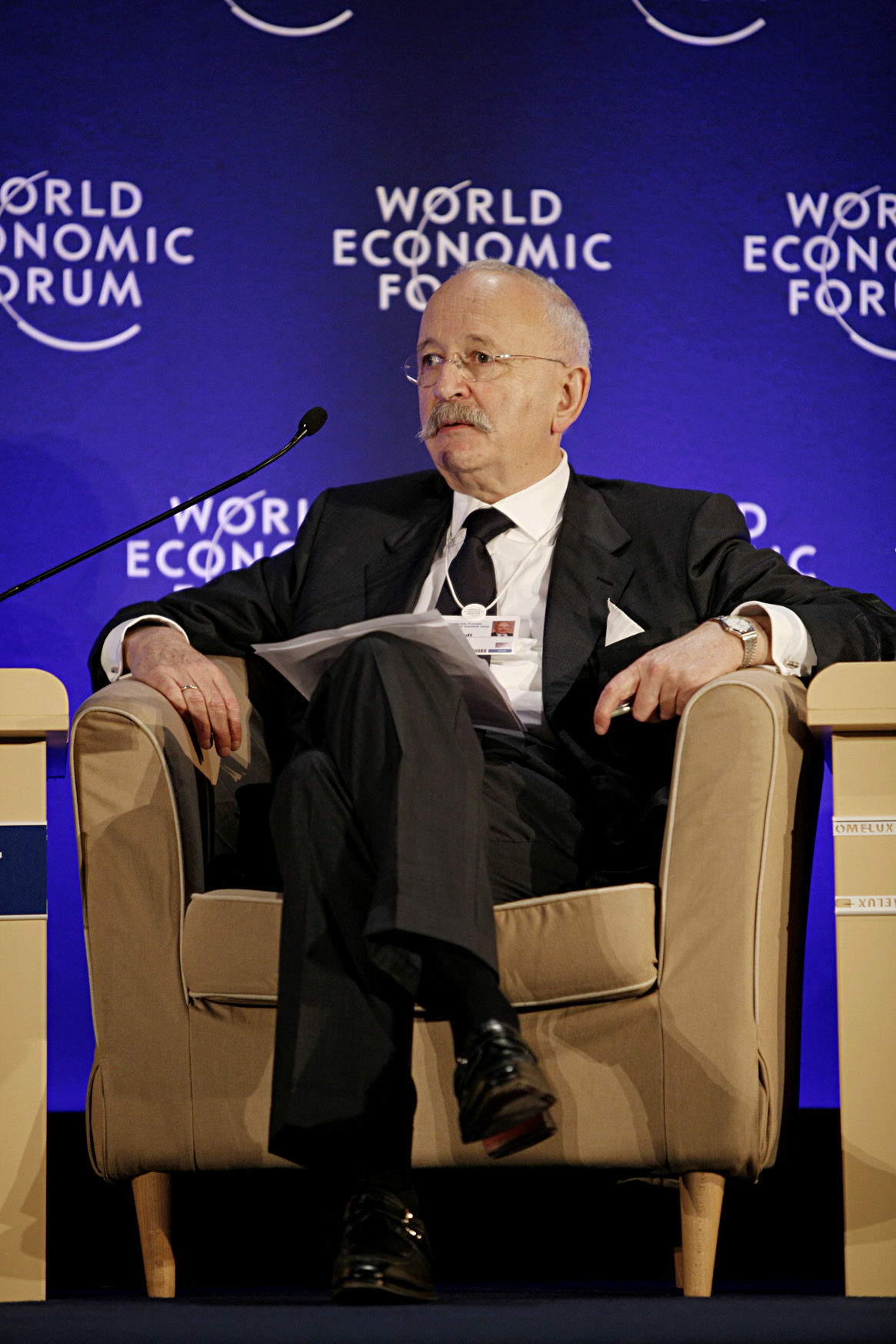
- Halberstadt in 2008
- Born: 16 June 1939; Amsterdam, Netherlands
- Died: 13 September 2024 (aged 85)

Academic work
- Discipline: Public sector finance
- Institutions: University of Amsterdam, Leiden University
- Awards: Order of the Netherlands Lion

Victor Halberstadt (16 June 1939 – 13 September 2024) was a Dutch economist. He was a Crown Member of the Social-Economic Council (1972–2004), president of the International Institute of Public Finance (1987–1990), director of Het Concertgebouw (1988–2011) and other significant organizations.

== Biography ==
Halberstadt was born on 16 June 1939, in Amsterdam, Netherlands. He was raised in a Jewish family and experienced the terrors of the Holocaust. From 1965 to 1974, Halberstadt was a senior lecturer of public sector finance at the University of Amsterdam. From 1971 to 1973, he was an adviser of the Directorate-General of the National Budget of the Dutch Ministry of Finance. On 9 September 1974, he was appointed professor of public sector finance of the University of Leiden. In October 1981, he was along with economist Cees de Galan appointed an informer to mediate the 1981 Dutch Cabinet crisis.

Halberstadt held several positions, including Crown Member of the Social-Economic Council (1972–2004), honorary secretary-general of the Bilderberg Group (1980–2000), president of the International Institute of Public Finance (1987–1990), director of Het Concertgebouw (1988–2011), member of the faculty of the World Economic Forum (1990–), member of the international advisory board of Goldman Sachs Group Inc (1991–), chairman of the Daimler-Chrysler international advisory board (1995–2005), member of the board of trustees of the Dutch National Opera (2003–), member of the board of trustees of the Lee Kuan Yew School of Public Policy (2005–) and member of the board of trustees of the Boekman Foundation (2009–). Since 1990, Halberstadt was a Knight of the Order of the Netherlands Lion. He was a member of the steering committee of the Bilderberg Group.

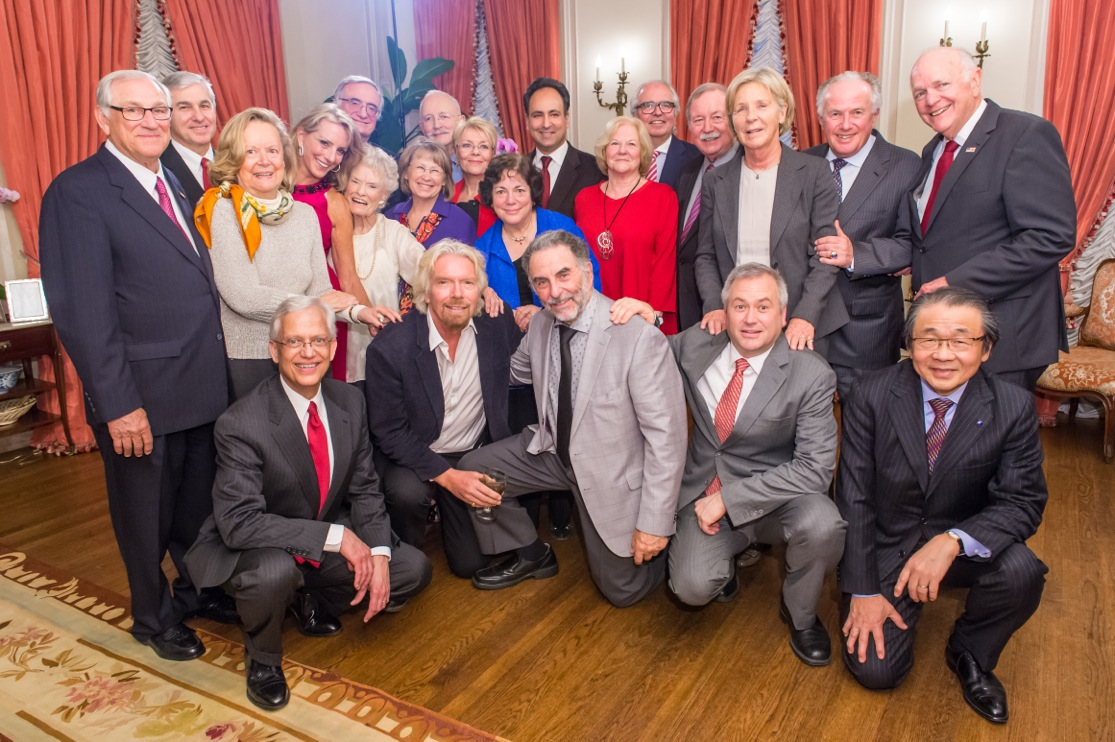
Victor Halberstadt with the board of directors of the International Centre for Missing & Exploited Children

Halberstadt was a member of the board of directors of the International Centre for Missing & Exploited Children (ICMEC), a global nonprofit organization that combats child sexual exploitation, child pornography, and child abduction.

Halberstadt died on 13 September 2024, at the age of 85.
