= Petr Aven =

Russian businessman, politician and economist

- Пëтр Авен
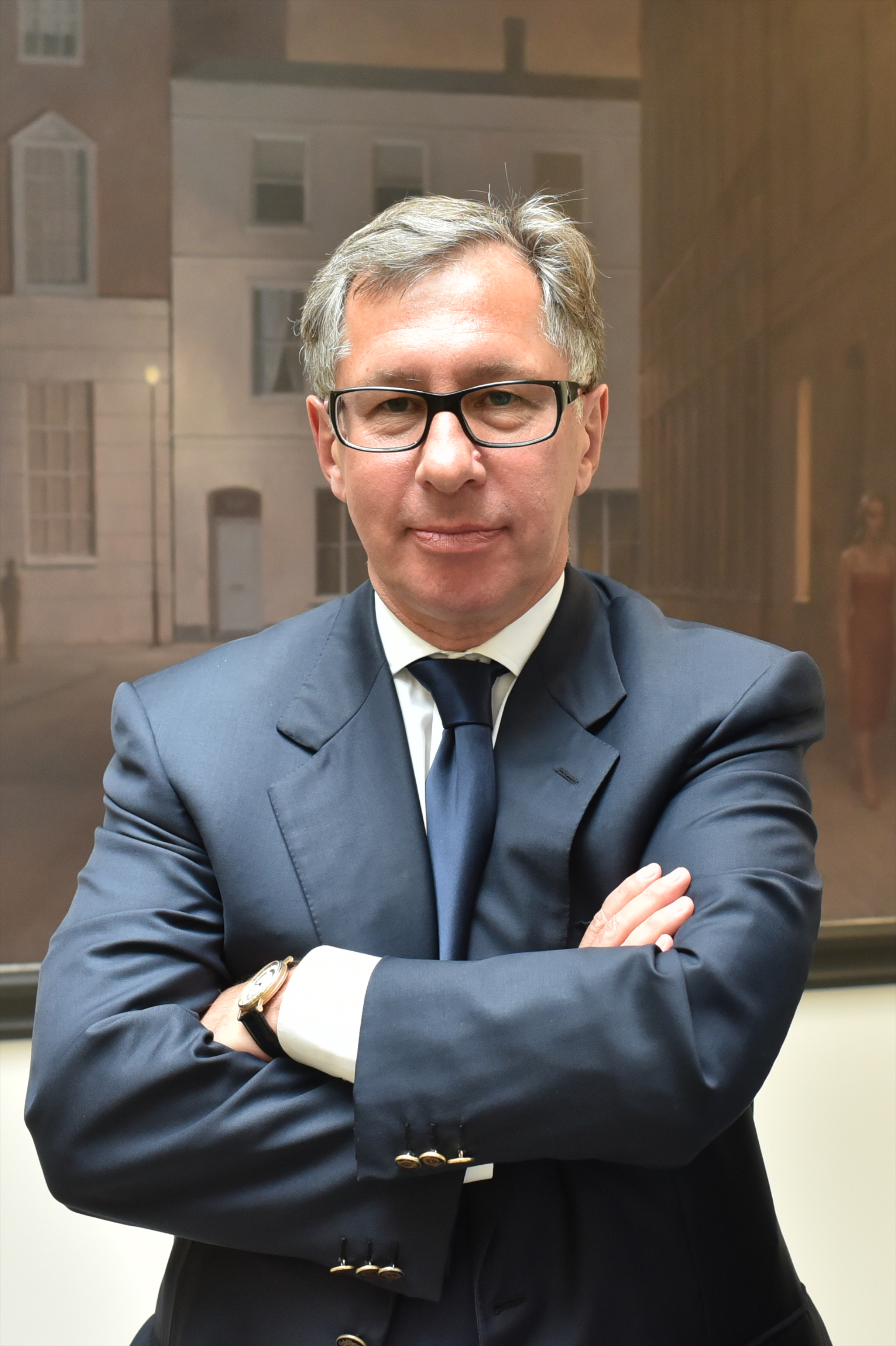
- Aven in 2015
- Born: 16 March 1955 (age 71); Moscow, Russian SFSR, Soviet Union
- Citizenship: Russian, Latvian
- Education: Moscow State University
- Occupation: Businessman
- Known for: Alfa-Bank
- Children: 2
- Website: https://petraven.info/

Petr Olegovich Aven (also transliterated Pyotr Aven; Russian: Пëтр Олегович Авен; Latvian: Pjotrs Avens; born 16 March 1955) is a Russian oligarch, economist and politician who also holds Latvian citizenship. Until March 2022 he headed Alfa-Bank, Russia's largest commercial bank. In March 2022, he resigned from the board of directors at Alfa-Bank and LetterOne Group amidst threat of sanctions. In 2023 he was named the 659th richest person in the world, with a net worth of around $4.2 billion.

Aven is a member of Russian leader Vladimir Putin's inner circle. Aven has met with Putin regularly, including soon after the Russian invasion in Ukraine. He is one of many Russian oligarchs named in the Countering America's Adversaries Through Sanctions Act, CAATSA. In 2022, Aven was included in EU sanctions imposed in the wake of the Russian invasion of Ukraine. He criticized the sanctions, alleging that they had been applied on a "spurious and unfounded basis", and filed a lawsuit in the European Court of Justice.

== Early life and education ==
Aven was born in Moscow, his father, professor of computer science Oleg Aven, was half Latvian and half Russian, and his mother was from a Jewish family. His paternal grandfather Janis Aven or Jānis Avens (lv) was a Latvian rifleman.

Petr Aven studied at Moscow Physics and Mathematics school №2. He graduated from Moscow State University in 1977 and holds a PhD in economics (1980).

== Career ==
After graduation from university, Aven was a senior researcher at the All-Union Research Institute for Systems Studies at the USSR Academy of Sciences and then spent time at the International Institute for Applied Systems Analysis in Laxenburg, Austria (1989–1991).

Concerning Russian economic reform in the early 1990s, he and other reformer colleagues had consulted with foreign academics by 1990 on trying to find a new system. When Boris Yeltsin became president, he appointed Aven with the task of making the ruble convertible and finding a solution to foreign debt. Aven went on to become the Minister of Foreign Economic Relations for the Russian Federation (1991–1992), serving as Russia's representative to the Group of Seven and conducting a number of high-level trade and economic missions to Western capitals. After leaving the government in December 1992, Aven became an adviser to the president of JSC "LogoVAZ" Boris Berezovsky and remained in this post until the end of 1993. In 1993 he joined the Russia's Choice movement and was a candidate for State Duma.

In October 1994, Aven met Alfa Group's Mikhail Fridman, and soon became an Alfa-Bank shareholder serving as a member of the supervisory board of the Alfa Group Consortium. From 1994 until June 2011, he served as the president of Alfa-Bank Russia. Currently Aven is a member of the board of directors and chairman of the board of directors of ABH Holdings S.A. Aven is also chairman of the board of directors at AlfaStrakhovanie Group, co-chairman of the board of directors of CTC Media, Inc. In 2012, the Alfa Group together with Viktor Vekselberg of Renova Group and Leonard Blavatnik of Access Industries sold their aggregate 50% stake in TNK-BP to state-owned Rosneft for $28 billion.

In 2013, Aven joined the Board of LetterOne Group, an international investment business founded by Mikhail Fridman and focused on the telecoms, technology and energy sectors. The L1 Group owns companies – and has equity investments in companies – with operations in 32 countries around the world.

LetterOne acquired assets from German utility business E. ON in October 2015, in a deal worth $1.6bn, that saw the Luxembourg-based group gain Norwegian oil and gas resources. In the following month, LetterOne also announced their intention to deal with Brazilian telecoms company Oi SA, and boost their presence in the mobile phone sector there.

In 2015 Petr Aven and Alfred Kokh published Gaidar's Revolution: The Inside Account of the Economic Transformation of Russia, drawing on their experience of the Russian Government and the former First Minister for the Economy, Yegor Gaidar. In his review of the book, John Lloyd of the Financial Times called it "an illuminating study of the reformers who sought to revive Russia's post-Soviet economy".

In 2017 Petr Aven published The age of Berezovsky (also known as The time of Berezovsky), the book about life of famous Russian business oligarch Boris Berezovsky. For it Aven interviewed many people who were familiar with Berezovsky, including Anatoly Chubais, Valentin Yumashev, Aleksandr Voloshin, Mikhail Fridman, Yuri Shefler and Demian Kudryavtsev. In the book Aven says that he has known Berezovsky since 1978 and was quite close to him: "It was Fridman and I who happened to be by Boris's bed after his attempted assassination in 1994, and it was our yacht that he chose to go after being discharged from hospital".

=== Sanctions ===
On 28 February 2022, the European Union blacklisted Aven and had all his assets frozen in relation to the 2022 Russian invasion of Ukraine.

On 9 April 2022, the French Ministry of Culture seized a Pyotr Konchalovsky painting owned by Petr Aven, "Sarkkipotrait" (1910), as part of the personal sanctions imposed on Aven in relation to the 2022 Russian invasion of Ukraine. The canvas had been part of the "Icônes de l'Art Russe" exhibition of the late Morozov brothers' collection of artworks at the Fondation Louis Vuitton in Paris.

Aven is currently the subject of a UK investigation into the possible evasion of sanctions, with transfers totaling £3 million to the UK from Austria in February 2022 under scrutiny. In May 2022 Aven's home was raided by officers from the National Crime Agency (NCA). Nonetheless, Aven's legal team scored a victory of sorts in July 2022, when a judge ruled that some of the accounts used to fund expenses for Aven's London mansion could be unfrozen. In late October 2022, Aven was granted living expenses of £60,000 by the UK Treasury, as well as a one-off payment of £388,000 to settle “pressing debts”, an award that drew condemnation from supporters of the UK sanctions regime. Aven claimed the money was needed to meet his “basic needs” and those of his family. He was sanctioned by the UK government in 2022 in relation to the Russo-Ukrainian War.

In April 2024, an EU court, citing a lack of evidence, annulled sanctions on Aven and his business partner Mikhail Fridman.

In May 2024, the NCA asked a UK court to permanently seize £1.1 million in funds held by Aven, describing them as "proceeds of crime".

== Libel suits ==
In 2005, a United States district court in Washington, D.C., dismissed a 2000 libel suit by Aven and fellow Alfa-Bank owner Mikhail Fridman against the Center for Public Integrity over an online article which included a suggestion that they had been involved in drug-running and organized crime; the federal judge ruled that there was no evidence of actual malice on the part of the publication and that Fridman and Aven were limited public figures regarding the public controversy involving corruption in post-Soviet Russia.

In May 2017, Aven, along with fellow Alfa-Bank owners Mikhail Fridman and German Khan, filed a defamation lawsuit against BuzzFeed for publishing the unverified Steele dossier, which alleges financial ties and collusion between Putin, Trump, and the three bank owners.

In October 2017, Aven, Fridman, and Khan also filed a libel suit against the opposition research agency Fusion GPS and its founder Glenn Simpson, who had commissioned former MI6 agent Christopher Steele to compile the dossier, for circulating the dossier among journalists and allowing it to be published. In May 2018, the Kremlin released a statement noting that Aven, Fridman and Khan were not representing interests of Putin or the Russian government. The statement followed a meeting between the Kremlin, Aven and Fridman. In April 2018, Aven, Fridman, and Khan filed a libel suit against Steele in the Superior Court of the District of Columbia, but the suit was dismissed with prejudice the following August.

In March 2022, after lawyers for Fusion GPS asked a federal judge to dismiss the case, the plaintiffs agreed to drop the lawsuit.

Together with fellow Alfa-Bank partners Mikhail Fridman and German Khan, Aven brought a lawsuit for defamation in Britain against Orbis Business Intelligence, Steele's private intelligence firm. In July 2020, Justice Warby from the Queen's Bench Division of the British High Court of Justice ordered Steele to pay damages to Aven and Fridman who Steele claimed had delivered "large amounts of illicit cash" to Vladimir Putin when Putin was deputy mayor of St. Petersburg. Judge Warby stated that the claim was "demonstrably false" and awarded the damages to compensate "for the loss of autonomy, distress and reputational damage caused by the breaches of duty". The judge stated that Steele's dossier also inaccurately claimed that Aven and Fridman provided foreign policy advice to Putin.

== Public activities ==
Petr Aven holds a number of public facing positions:

- A member of the Endowment Foundation board of trustees of the New Economic School.
- A trustee of the Centre for Economic Policy Research (CEPR) in Great Britain.
- A member of the board of trustees of the Pushkin Museum of Fine Arts.
- A trustee of the board of National Association for National Financial Reporting Standards.
- A member of the council of trustees of the Russian Olympians Foundation.
- A professor at State University Higher School of Economics.
- A member of President's Council on International Activities of Yale University (USA).
- A member of the Presidium of Russian International Affairs Council (RIAC).

Since April 2006, Aven has been a member of the board of directors of the Russian Union of Industrialists and Entrepreneurs. In 2007, Aven became chairman of the Russia-Latvian Business Council.

Aven has acted as a guest professor and lecturer at some universities, including Yale University, Bar-Elan University (Israel), and the University of Glasgow and has published two books on econometrics and on economic reform and numerous articles in Russian and international journals, including in Communist Economies and Economic Transformation in Economic Policy. Yale University Press and the Kiel Institute of World Economics, and other scientific and academic institutes have published Aven's monographs.

He has received a number of international awards, including the best manager in the financial services sector in Russia in 2004 by Institutional Investor.

Aven is a supporter of the arts and theatre in Russia. Aven along with Stan Polovets and three fellow Russian Jewish billionaires, Mikhail Fridman, Alexander Knaster, and German Khan, founded the Genesis Philanthropy Group whose purpose is to develop and enhance Jewish identity among Russian-speaking Jews worldwide.

In 2008, Petr and Elena Aven established the charity foundation "Generation". Its priorities are "support for children's healthcare, cultural exchange projects between Latvia and Russia, as well as scholarships and grants in the field of science.

Since 2012 the foundation has been supporting the Madona Hospital in northeastern Latvia. One of the first baby boxes in Latvia is equipped with the help of the foundation.

Aven is also a recognised art collector. His first art purchase was a still life by Pavel Kuznetsov in 1993, and afterwards he began collecting mostly pre-Soviet Russian art, as well as art by artists of other nationalities. Works from his collection have been lent to the Jewish Museum in Moscow, the Tate in London, the Museum of Modern Art in New York and recently the Royal Academy. In May 2015, pieces from Aven's private collection were put on display at New York's Neue Galerie in an exhibition examining early twentieth century Russian art and its relationship with German art of the time.

Aven has been vociferous in his criticism of fake artworks from the school of Russian avant-garde. This included criticism of the recent showing of avant-garde works at the Ghent Museum.

On 3 November 2015, Aven received the Woodrow Wilson Award for Corporate Citizenship in recognition of his contribution to corporate and public service to U.S.-Russia relations, at the 2015 Kathryn and Shelby Cullom Davis Awards Dinner. The award was given to Aven in recognition of his many achievements in building understanding between Russians and Americans during his career, and for his role as co-founder of the Alfa Fellowship Program, which gives emerging young leaders from around the world the opportunity to gain professional experience in the private sector, government, and non-profit community, creating a new generation of American experts on Russia.

In 2021 Aven bought a building in the center of Riga to establish a museum for his collection. He is a trustee of the UK Royal Academy of Arts Development Trust.

In 2013, Aven was awarded an honorary doctorate by the University of Latvia "for scientific and practical contributions to Latvia's development and cooperation with Russia". Said doctorate was revoked unanimously in 2022 because of Aven's position for supporting Vladimir Putin and due to the 2022 Russian invasion of Ukraine.

== See also ==
- Mueller Report
- Semibankirschina
- Timeline of investigations into Trump and Russia
- Alfa-Bank
- LetterOne
- Privatization in Russia
