= Wulf von Schimmelmann =

German manager (born 1947)

- Education: University of Hamburg; University of Zürich
- Occupation: Businessman

Wulf Freiherr von Schimmelmann (born February 19, 1947, in Steinhöring) is a German manager. He was chairman of the Postbank's executive board from February 1999 to June 2007, and was chairman of the supervisory board of Deutsche Post AG between January 1, 2009, and April 2018.

== Early life and education ==
Von Schimmelmann graduated from the Schule Schloss Salem and studied economics in Hamburg and Zurich. He received a bachelor's degree in business administration from the University of Hamburg, followed by a bachelor's degree in economics from the University of Zürich. He received a doctorate in business administration and economics from the University of Zurich. He earned his doctorate summa cum laude to which his dissertation dealt with the savings behavior of private persons.

== Career ==
Von Schimmelmann first worked for the management consultancy McKinsey & Company. He started in 1972, with positions in Cleveland, Ohio, Kuwait, and Düsseldorf and stayed with the company, eventually as a Partner, until 1978. From 1978 to 1984, he worked for Landesgirokasse-Bank in Stuttgart, Germany, where he served as a board member.

From 1984 to 1991, Von Schimmelmann served on the management board of DG Bank in Frankfurt. He served on the board of managing directors of BHF Bank from 1991 to 1999.

Von Schimmelmann served as the chief executive officer of Deutsche Postbank, a German retail bank, from 1999 to 2007, after Klaus Zumwinkel, with whom he had been acquainted since working for McKinsey, had promoted him to CEO and a part of the management board of Deutsche Post AG. He oversaw the bank's expansion to become Germany's leading retail bank with nearly 15 million customers and the group's stock market listing in 2004. Under his leadership, Postbank joined the DAX in 2006.

In 2007, Von Schimmelmann unexpectedly resigned from the post of CEO of Postbank for "personal reasons"; his contract originally ran until 2008. Until December 2009, he was also a member of the supervisory board at Deutsche Telekom, and in January 2009, he became chairman of the supervisory board of Deutsche Post AG. He served as chairman until April 2018 and was succeeded by Nikolaus von Bomhard.

== Other activities ==
=== Corporate boards ===
- LetterOne, Non-Executive Member of the Board of Directors
- Maxingvest, Member of the Supervisory Board
- Thomson Reuters, Independent Member of the Board of Director (since 2011)
- Altadis, Member of the Board of Directors (since 2004)
- Accenture, Member of the Board of Directors (2001-)
- Western Union, Member of the Board of Directors (2009–2014)
- BAWAG P.S.K., Member of the supervisory board (2007–2009)
- SAP, chairman of the supervisory board (1988–1992)

=== Non-profit organizations ===
- Allensbach Institute, Member of the Board of Trustees
- Deutsche Schutzvereinigung für Wertpapierbesitz (DSW), Member of the Board of Trustees
- Max Planck Foundation, Member of the Supervisory Board

Von Schimmelmann is also honorary Professor at the Faculty of Economics of the University of Konztanz, which awarded him an honorary doctorate in 2006. He also serves on the Germany government's corporate governance commission.

Von Schimmelmann is the founder of Stiftung Startchance, a foundation for disadvantaged children.

== Personal life ==
Von Schimmelmann stems from the Holstein-Danish noble family Schimmelmann. He has been married to Benita Freiin von Gersdorff since March 1996 and lives in Berg (Starnberger See).
