= Finland–Italy relations =

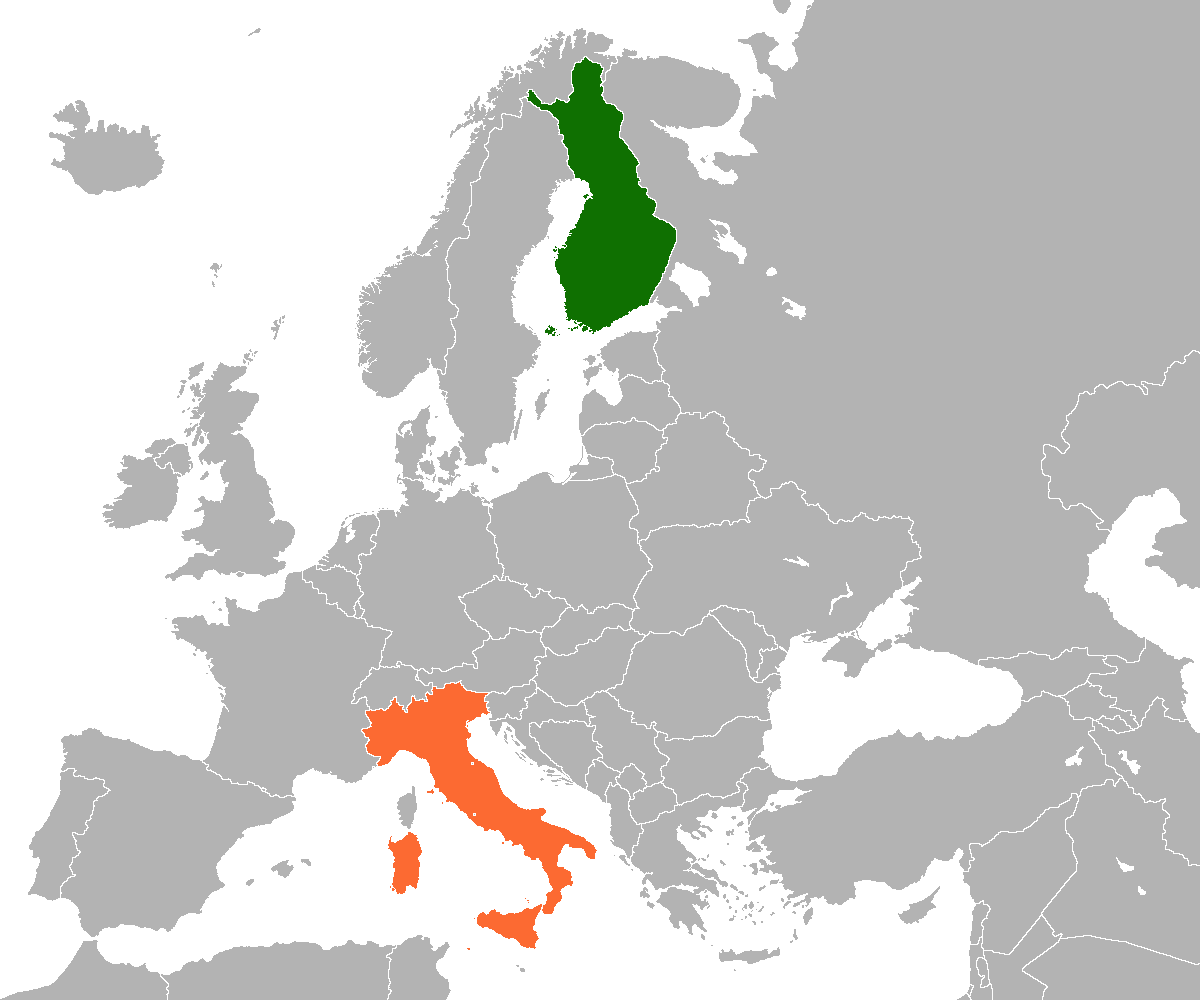
- Finland: Italy

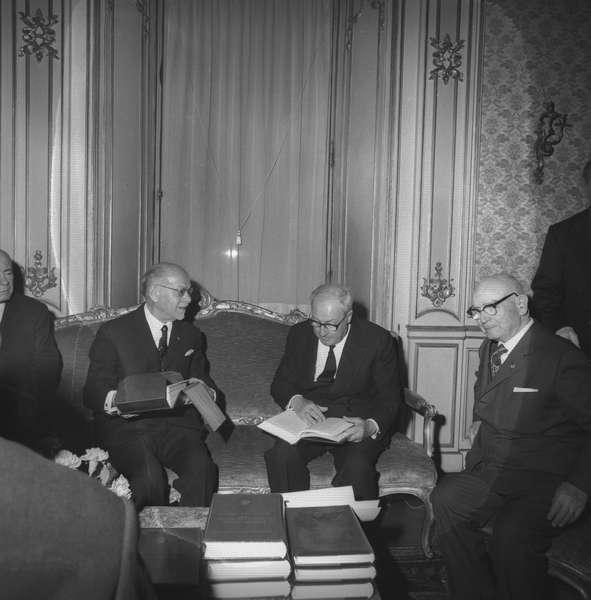
Finnish President Urho Kekkonen and Italian President Giuseppe Saragat in 1971

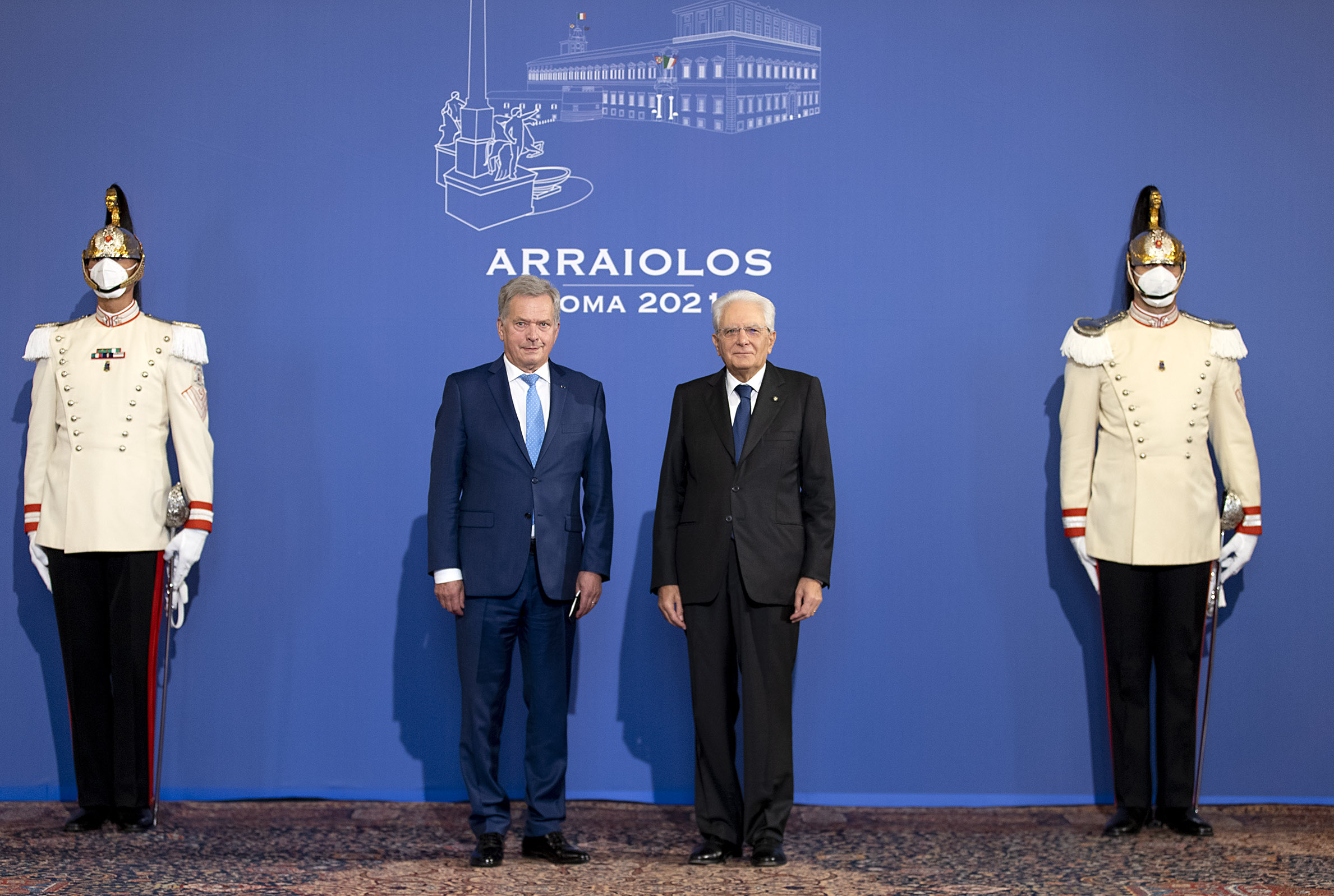
Sauli Niinistö and Sergio Mattarella

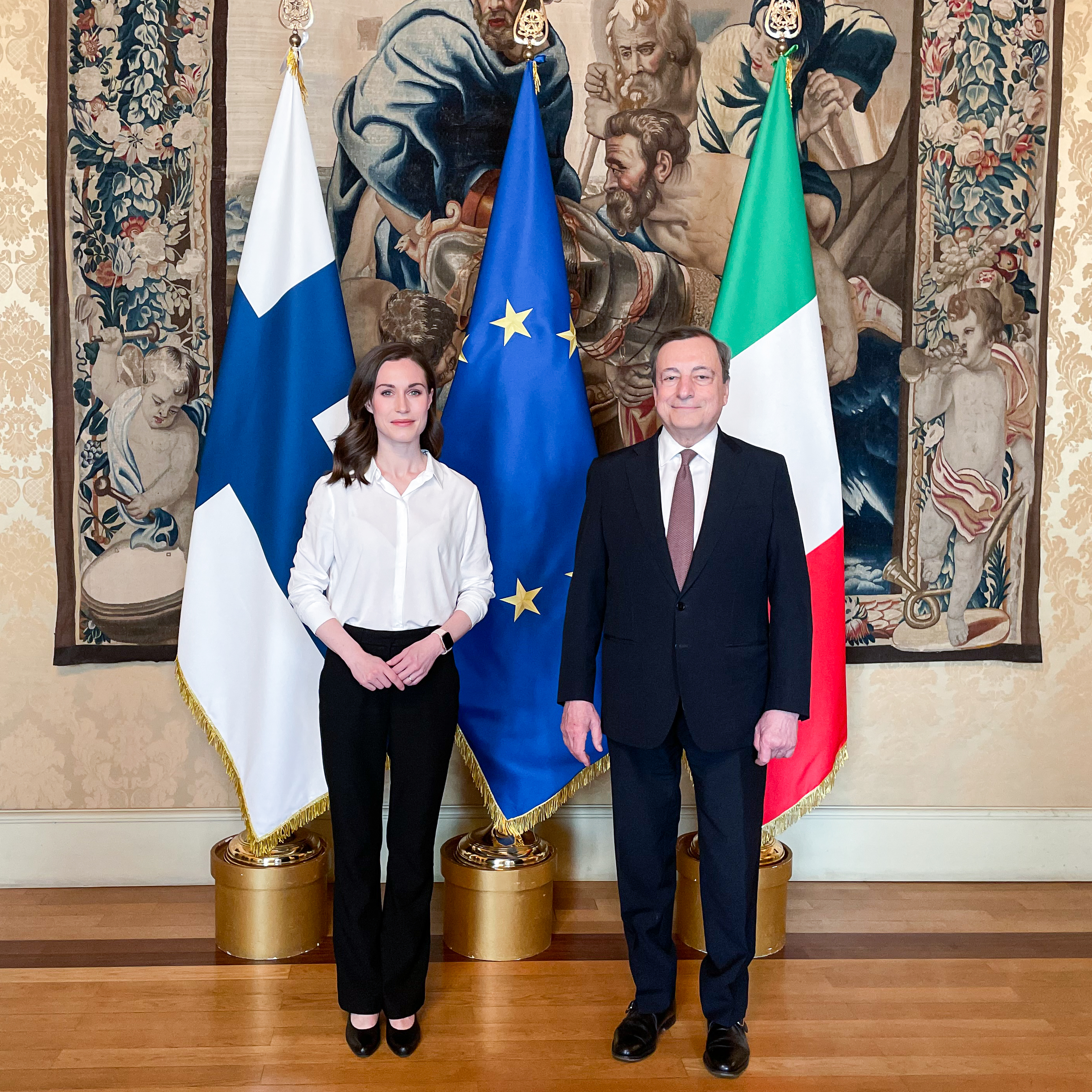
Sanna Marin and Mario Draghi

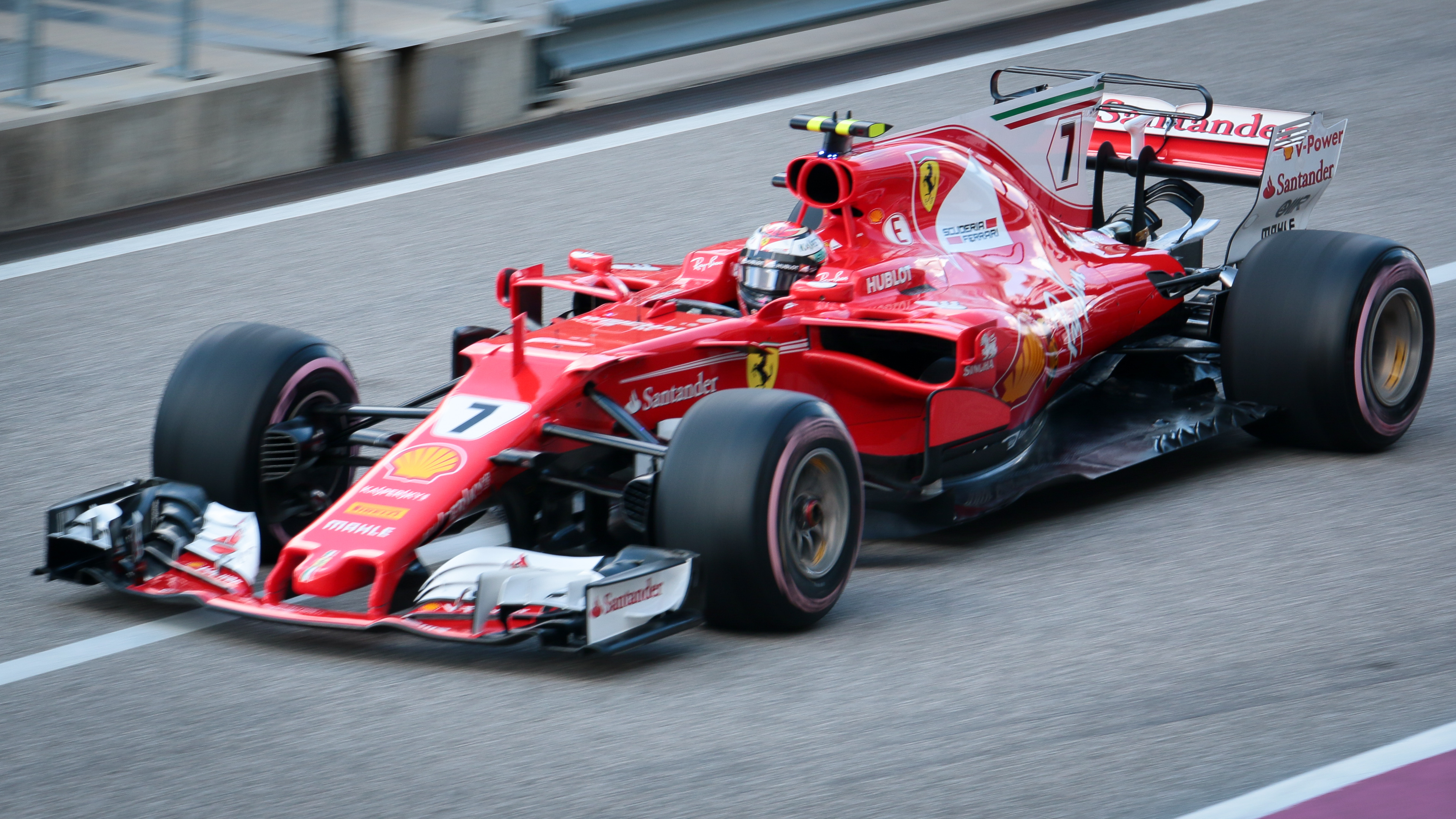
F1 driver Kimi Räikkönen with Ferrari in 2017 season

Finland–Italy relations are foreign relations between Finland and Italy. Both countries established diplomatic relations on 6 September 1919. Finland has an embassy in Rome, Italy has an embassy in Helsinki. Both countries are full members of the European Union, NATO, Organization for Security and Co-operation in Europe, Council of Europe and the Eurozone.

The political relations between Finland and Italy are excellent according to the embassies of both nations. On 18 May 2022, Italian Prime Minister Mario Draghi announced that Italy would fully support Finland and Sweden's applications for NATO membership. Italy supported Finland's NATO membership during Finland's accession into NATO, which was finalized on 4 April 2023. In August 2022, Italy fully approved Finland's application for NATO membership.

== High level visits ==
In 1971, President of Finland Urho Kekkonen made a three-day state visit to Italy.

In 2012, Prime Minister of Italy Mario Monti visited Helsinki for meeting Jyrki Katainen, Finland's prime minister.

In 2019, the Minister of Foreign Affairs of Finland, Timo Soini met his Italian counterpart Enzo Moavero Milanesi in Rome.

In 2022, Prime Minister of Finland Sanna Marin visited Rome to meet Italy’s Prime Minister Mario Draghi. During the meeting, the Italian Prime Minister gave his support to Finland and Sweden's decision to join NATO.

== Trade ==
In 2020, Finland imported goods worth 1716 million euros from Italy, making Italy the 10th largest importer to Finland.

In 2021, the total value of exported goods from Italy to Finland was 2.0 billion euros and Finland's exports to Italy amounted to 2.9 billion euros. The most exported goods from Italy to Finland were machinery and transport equipment (€807 million), chemical substances (€242 million), and metals (€150 million). The most exported goods from Finland to Italy were machinery and transport equipment (€1.5 billion), metals (€652 million), and paper and cardboard products (€259 million).

90 companies from Italy are at least partially owned by Finns. These companies include Wärtsilä, Kemira, Ahlström, Nokia, F-Secure, Kone, Metso, UPM, Stora Enso, Metsä Board, Fiskars-Iittala, Qvantel and Tapojärvi. In Finland companies owned by Italians include, Finnlines, Nautor’s Swan, Sako, Meiran paahtimo, Prysmianin and Prima Power.

== Culture ==
Over 200,000 journeys to Italy are made by Finns yearly. The number of Finns with permanent residence in Italy is estimated to be 4,000 by the Finnish Embassy in Rome. In Italy the Finnish language can be studied in the University of Bologna, University of Florence and University of Naples. Additionally, the Finland Society organizes Finnish language courses open to everyone.

The Finnish Institute in Rome provides research opportunities, courses and residences for Finnish or Finland-based students and researchers. The institute focuses on ancient and medieval history, classical philology, classical archaeology, and art history.

The Italian Culture Institute in Helsinki offers Italian language courses, cultural events, and materials for advancement of Finland-Italy cultural relations.

== Agreements ==
Agreements between Finland and Italy include the following:

- Trade and Maritime Agreement, 1925 (amendment 1950, repeal of certain provisions 1988)
- Agreement on the Exchange of Marital Status Notices, 1928
- Agreement on the Legalization of Certificates of Origin, 1930
- Agreement on the Reciprocal Abolition of Medical and Consular Certificates, 1950
- Payment Agreement, 1951 (additional protocol 1953, additional agreement 1955)
- Agreement on the Removal of Entry Stamps, 1954 (amendment 1958)
- Trainee exchange agreements, 1962
- Agreement on the Customs Clearance and Taxation of Aircraft Used in Reciprocal Air Transport, 1973
- Agreement on Reciprocal Tax Relief for Cultural Institutions, 1974
- Agreement on Cultural and Scientific Cooperation, 1976
- Veterinary Agreement on the export of meat from Finland to Italy, 1976
- Agreement on the International Carriage of Goods by Road, 1977
- Tax Convention, 1983
- Air Transport Agreement, 1985
- Agreement on Cooperation and Mutual Assistance in Customs Matters, 1990
- Agreement on the Reciprocal Protection of Classified Information, 2008

== Transport ==
Both countries belong to European route E45. Finnair operates flights between Helsinki and several Italian cities.

== Resident diplomatic missions ==
- Finland has an embassy in Rome, an honorary consulate-general in Venice, and honorary consulates in several other cities including Milan.
- Italy has an embassy in Helsinki.
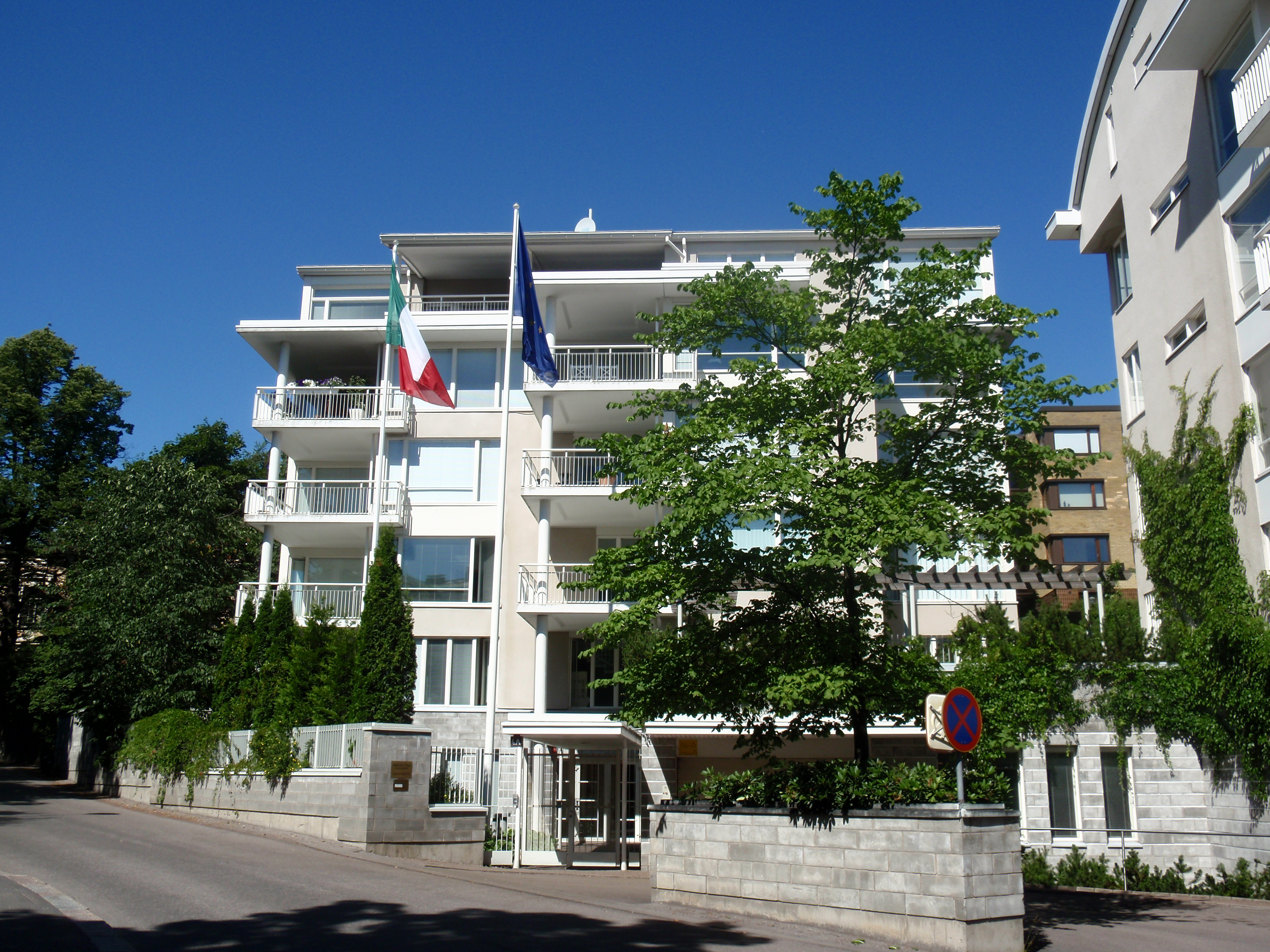
Embassy of Italy in Helsinki

== Vice consulates ==
Italy also has four honorary vice-consulates in Joensuu, Jyväskylä, Oulu and Rovaniemi.

== See also ==
- Foreign relations of Finland
- Foreign relations of Italy
- NATO-EU relations
- Italians in Finland
