= National Missing Children's Day =

May 25 Designated by US President Ronald Reagan

National Missing Children's Day has been commemorated in the United States on May 25, since 1983, when it was first proclaimed by President Ronald Reagan. It falls on the same day as the International Missing Children's Day, which was established in 2001. The day is intended to raise awareness for child safety and abduction prevention, honoring those who make substantial efforts toward the cause.

In the several years preceding the establishment of National Missing Children's day, a series of high-profile missing-children cases made national headlines.

On May 25, 1979, six-year-old Etan Patz disappeared from his New York City home on his way from bus to school. The date of his disappearance was designated as National Missing Children's Day. At the time, cases of missing children rarely garnered national media attention, but his case quickly received extensive coverage. His father, a professional photographer, distributed black-and-white photographs of him in an effort to find him. The resulting massive search and media attention that followed focused the public's attention on the problem of child abduction and the lack of plans to address it.

For almost three years, media attention was focused on Atlanta, Georgia, where the bodies of young children were discovered in lakes, marshes, and ponds along roadside trails. Twenty-nine bodies were recovered in the Atlanta murders of 1979–1981 before a suspect was arrested and convicted.

== See also ==
- International child abduction
- International Missing Children's Day
- National Center for Missing & Exploited Children
