= International Centre for Missing & Exploited Children =

Nonprofit global organization

- Abbreviation: ICMEC
- Formation: May 1998; 28 years ago
- Type: non-governmental
- Legal status: 501(c)(3) nonprofit global organization
- Purpose: protecting children from child sexual exploitation, child pornography, child trafficking and child abduction
- Headquarters: 2318 Mill Road; Alexandria, Virginia, U.S.
- Secretary General to Strengthen Global Efforts Against Child Exploitation: Stephen Kavanagh
- Board of directors: Chairman Dr. Franz Humer
- Key people: Jeff Koons, Board member and founder, along with his wife, of the Koons Family Institute on International Law and Policy, ICMEC's research arm.
- Website: www.icmec.org

The International Centre for Missing & Exploited Children (ICMEC), headquartered in Alexandria, Virginia, with a regional presence in the United Kingdom, Europe, Turkey, Africa, Canada, Latin America, Caribbean, Southeast Asia, India, Japan, South Korea and Taiwan, is a private 501(c)(3) non-governmental, nonprofit global organization. It combats child sexual exploitation, child pornography, child trafficking and child abduction.

Formed in 1998, ICMEC heads a global missing children's network of 29 countries. The organization has trained law enforcement personnel from 121 countries, works with law enforcement in over 100 countries, and has worked with legislatures in 100 countries to adopt new laws combating child sexual abuse material. ICMEC also encourages the creation of national operational centers built on a public-private partnership model, and leads global financial and industry coalitions to eradicate child sexual exploitation and child pornography.

The Koons Family Institute on International Law and Policy is the International Centre's research arm. In August 2008, ICMEC was granted "Special Consultative Status" by the United Nations Economic and Social Council (ECOSOC), to assist the UN with its expertise regarding child sexual exploitation and child abduction. ICMEC also works with the intergovernmental organization INTERPOL, the inter-continental organization the Organization of American States (the OAS), and the Hague Conference on Private International Law.

== History ==
In 1998, the Board of Directors of the United States' National Center for Missing and Exploited Children (NCMEC) approved the creation of the International Centre; the two now act as sister organizations. ICMEC combats child sexual exploitation, child pornography, and child abduction.

ICMEC held its first Board of Directors meeting in May 1998. It was officially launched in April 1999 at the British Embassy in Washington, D.C., by Hillary Clinton, then-First Lady of the United States, and Cherie Blair, wife of then-British Prime Minister Tony Blair.

Ernie Allen served as President & CEO of both NCMEC and ICMEC for 15 years. Allen retired from NCMEC in 2012, and in 2014 announced his retirement from ICMEC as well. In 2014, Ambassador Maura Harty was appointed President & CEO of ICMEC. Robert Cunningham was appointed President and CEO in 2019.

== Board of directors ==
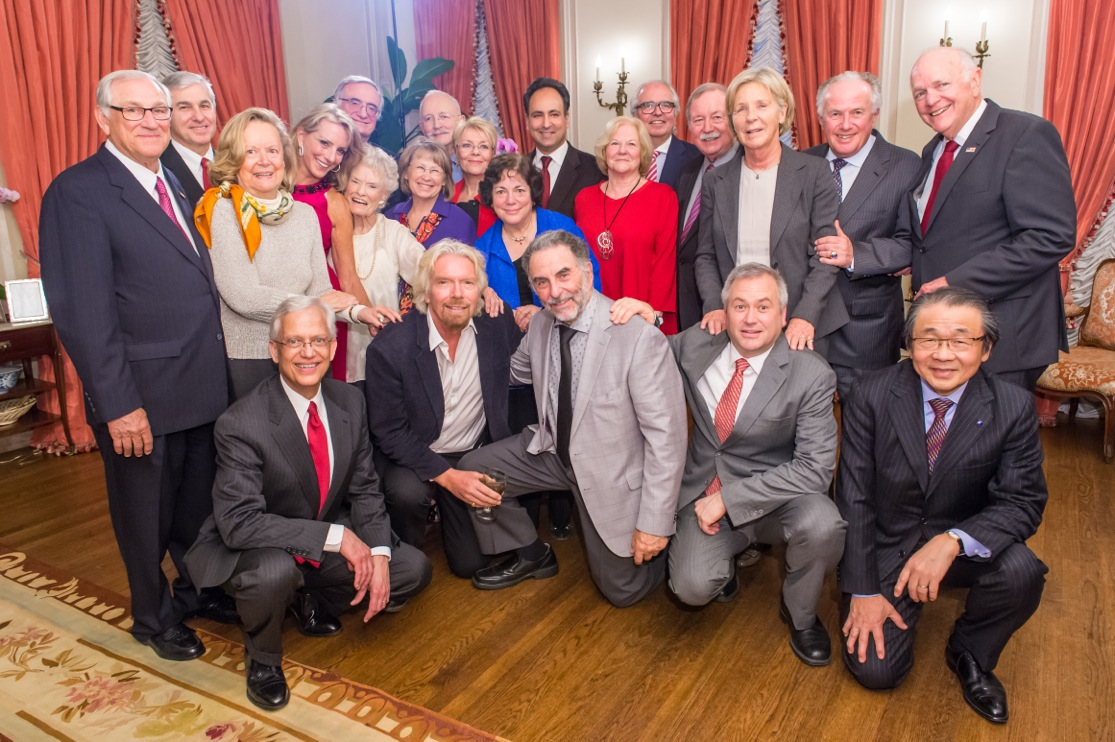
ICMEC Board of Directors

The Board of Directors of ICMEC includes: Franz Humer, Maud de Boer-Buquicchio, Dennis DeConcini, Daniel H. Cohen, Victor Halberstadt, Jeff Koons, Osamu Nagayama, Raymond F. Schinazi, Patty Wetterling (in purple).

== Koons Family Institute on International Law and Policy ==
In 2007, American artist Jeff Koons, along with his wife Justine, founded the Koons Family Institute on International Law and Policy. It is the International Centre's research arm.

As highlighted by articles over the years, including a Wall Street Journal article entitled "Pooling Resources to Fight Child Abuse and Abduction", the issue of child abduction is personal to Koons. Following the end of his marriage to Hungarian-born Italian porn actress Ilona Staller in 1994, as she wanted to continue to perform as a porn actress and Koons wanted them to be monogamous, Staller, in violation of a US court order, left with their then-two-year-old son, Ludwig and took the child to Italy. After Koons spent millions of dollars in legal fees over a five-year period pursuing parental rights to his young son, the Italian Supreme Court failed to recognize the couples' US-based joint custody agreement and instead sided with Staller.

This loss for Koons led him to establish the Koons Family Institute, and devote over $4.3 million to the International Centre's work. In addition, Koons' 2010 partnership with Kiehl's to design the artwork for a limited edition moisturizer line raised $200,000 for the Koons Family Institute.

In 2006, the International Centre published a report of findings on the presence of child pornography legislation in the then-184 INTERPOL member countries. It later updated this information, in subsequent editions, to include 196 UN member countries. The report, entitled "Child Pornography: Model Legislation & Global Review", assesses whether national legislation:

(1) exists with specific regard to child pornography; (2) provides a definition of child pornography; (3) expressly criminalizes computer-facilitated offenses; (4) criminalizes the knowing possession of child pornography, regardless of intent to distribute; and (5) requires ISPs to report suspected child pornography to law enforcement or to some other mandated agency.

ICMEC stated that it found in its initial report that only 27 countries had legislation needed to deal with child pornography offenses, while 95 countries did not have any legislation that specifically addressed child pornography, making child pornography a global issue worsened by the inadequacies of domestic legislation. The 7th Edition Report found that still only 69 countries had legislation needed to deal with child pornography offenses, while 53 did not have any legislation specifically addressing the problem. Over seven years of research from 2006 to 2012, ICMEC and the Institute report that they have worked with 100 countries that have revised or put in place new child pornography laws.

In June 2009, the Koons Family Institute partnered with The Protection Project at Johns Hopkins University Paul H. Nitze School of Advanced International Studies, creating the Child Protection Project, to draft a model law focusing on the issues of child protection; in particular: "neglect, abuse, maltreatment, and exploitation". The primary objectives of the Child Protection Project are to: "research existing child protection laws in the 193 member states of the United Nations (UN); convene a series of regional expert working group meetings to establish a common definition for 'child protection;' create a database of national legislation and case law on child protection issues from around the world; and draft, publish, and globally disseminate model child protection legislation."

The drafting process included six expert group meetings, held in Singapore, Egypt, Costa Rica, Spain, Turkey, and the US. The final version of the Child Protection Model Law was published in January 2013. It was presented to the members of the UN Committee on the Rights of the Child during its 62nd Session in Geneva, Switzerland, in January 2013. It was also presented before the 129th Assembly of the Inter-Parliamentary Union (IPU) in Geneva in October 2013. Accompanying the Child Protection Model Law, ICMEC and The Protection Project published a companion "100 Best Practices in Child Protection" guide in 2013.

In March 2013, ICMEC became a member of the World Bank Global Forum on Law, Justice and Development. The Koons Family Institute works with the Global Forum to produce "Desk Reviews" of national legislation and policy responses in Latin America and Asia, with a focus on protecting children from violence and abuse, in particular from child pornography, online grooming, cyberbullying, and sexting, through the use of the internet and other technologies.

== Global Missing Children's Network ==
Launched in 1998 as a joint venture of NCMEC and ICMEC, the Global Missing Children's Network (GMCN) is a network of countries that connect, share best practices, and disseminate information and images of missing children to improve the effectiveness of missing children investigations. The Network has 31 member countries: Albania, Argentina, Australia, Belgium, Brazil, Canada, Chile, Costa Rica, Ecuador, France, Germany, Greece, Guatemala, Ireland, Italy, Jamaica, Lithuania, Mexico, the Netherlands, New Zealand, Poland, Portugal, Russia, Serbia, South Korea, Spain, Switzerland, Taiwan, the United Kingdom, and the United States.

Each country can access a customizable website platform, and can enter missing children information into a centralized, multilingual database that has photos of and information about missing children, which can be viewed and distributed to assist in location and recovery efforts. GMCN staff train new countries joining the Network, and provide an annual member conference sponsored by Motorola Solutions Foundation at which best practices, current issues, trends, policies, procedures, and possible solutions are discussed.

The parents of Madeleine McCann, a four-year-old girl who disappeared from her hotel in Portugal in 2007, approached ICMEC to help them publicize her case. ICMEC's YouTube channel, "Don'tYouForgetAboutMe", which lets people post videos, images, and information about their missing children, was launched that year as a part of these efforts, and as of November 2014 had 2,200 members. ICMEC reviews the postings to ensure that any child in a posted video is in fact missing, that authorities are aware that the child is missing, and that the images are not inappropriate.

== Law enforcement training ==
ICMEC's child protection work includes training law enforcement officers. Since 2003, along with INTERPOL and Microsoft Corporation, which contributed $1.5 million to the global law enforcement training program, ICMEC has trained officers in methods of investigating cases of child sexual abuse and exploitation. As of September 2012, ICMEC had conducted more than 50 such law enforcement training sessions, of greater than 5,000 law enforcement officers from more than 120 countries.

== The Hague, UN, INTERPOL, and the OAS ==
In 2003, ICMEC signed it Memorandum of Understanding with the Hague Conference on Private International Law, the goal of which is to raise money for projects that interest both organizations.

In August 2008, ICMEC was granted "Special Consultative Status" by the United Nations Economic and Social Council (ECOSOC), to assist the UN with its expertise regarding child sexual exploitation and child abduction. ICMEC also works with the intergovernmental organization INTERPOL, the inter-continental organization the Organization of American States (the OAS), the Hague Conference on Private International Law, and law enforcement and elected officials in a number of countries.

== Financial Coalition Against Child Pornography ==
In 2006, ICMEC, NCMEC, and a number of banks, credit card companies, and electronic and third party payment networks created the Financial Coalition Against Child Pornography (FCACP). The Financial Coalition consists of 34 banks, payment companies, and internet services companies. The Financial Coalition, whose members account for 90% of the US payments industry, aims to eliminate the ability of vendors and buyers to purchase child pornography, by closing payment accounts they use to buy and sell illegal child pornography.

In 2007, the FCACP developed and published a best practices guide for financial institutions, entitled "Internet Merchant Acquisition and Monitoring Best Practices for Prevention and Detection of Commercial Child Pornography". The guide was distributed to banks in the United States by the US Comptroller of the Currency and the Federal Deposit Insurance Corporation. In 2008, the Coalition published a second paper, entitled "Trends in Migration, Hosting and Payment for Commercial Child Pornography Websites".

This U.S.-based effort expanded regionally with the creation of the Asia Pacific Financial Coalition in August 2009. The Coalition's initial objective was to make people and companies aware of the issue of online child sexual abuse, and how its sale and distribution was being conducted across payment and technology platforms. In 2013, the Asia Pacific FCACP/ICMEC published "Confronting New Challenges in the Fight Against Child Pornography: Best Practices to Help File Hosting and File Sharing Companies Fight the Distribution of Child Sexual Exploitation Content".

== Project VIC ==
ICMEC manages and supports Project VIC. It is an image and video hash-sharing initiative that streamlines investigative workflows and narrows the focus of law enforcement investigations by filtering the material investigators find on offenders' computers. Using robust hash sets, Project VIC technology allows law enforcement to determine which images retrieved have already been identified, and are part of the Project's database of millions of digital hashes of child porn, enabling detectives to focus on those that are new children waiting to be located and recovered.

The initiative uses donated technologies, such as Microsoft's Photo DNA, which creates a "fingerprint" that can be used to uniquely identify an individual photo. The technology also assists online service providers, by helping them detect child sexual abuse images shared on their sites, and block their continued dissemination.

In addition, in April 2014 the British company Friend MTS Ltd. donated its video fingerprinting technology (known as F1) to ICMEC to help increase the efficiency of child pornography investigations, and to halt the continued sharing of similar files over the internet. ICMEC distributes the technology to law enforcement agencies, software providers, and online service providers to hinder the spread of such material.

Simultaneously, Project VIC, along with the U.S. Department of Homeland Security, is in the process of compiling a cloud-based archive to consolidate and store the immense amount of data related to these cases, and identify new material as soon as it is shared or transferred.

== Global Health Coalition ==
In 2012, ICMEC created the Global Health Coalition, composed of health sector experts and leaders, to address child sexual abuse and exploitation as a global "public health crisis". ICMEC cited studies by the Mayo Clinic and others concluding that a history of abuse and exploitation as children leads to a number of health disorders in adulthood. ICMEC seeks to encourage the health sector to incorporate child sexual abuse into medical school curricula, increase timely victim recognition through medical training and education, and conduct epidemiological studies to improve healthcare services for victims. Coalition members include Roche, Merck, GlaxoSmithKline, Harvard Medical School, the American Academy of Pediatrics, and the Centers for Disease Control and Prevention (CDC).

== Digital Economy Task Force ==
In 2013, ICMEC and Thomson Reuters Corporation hosted a conference of experts and leaders to examine the benefits and risks of the developing digital economy. The conference members included representatives from government, academia, civil society, and online services/web companies. The conference led to the August 2013 launch of the Digital Economy Task Force. The Task Force assesses the benefits and the risks of an economy that has the potential to be 100% anonymous.

In March 2014, the Digital Economy Task Force released its first report, "The Digital Economy: Potential, Perils, and Promises", consisting of a number of recommendations for policy makers, financial institutions, and law enforcement. The report recognizes the opportunities that a digital economy offers, but also highlights the potential for its abuse and misuse, including its role in facilitating criminal activities, including the sexual exploitation of children. Recommendations included the continuation of private and public sector research on the issue, investment in law enforcement training on how the digital economy operates, and the promotion of a global cross-sector discussion that can lead to clear policy on the issue.

== Regional activities ==
ICMEC has regional offices in Brazil, Singapore, and operations across six continents. The Centre encourages the creation of national operational centers built on a public-private partnership model.

The ICMEC Latin America & Caribbean office works to help individual country legislators, government agencies, and regional bodies draft uniform legislation and train officers on how to respond to cases of child trafficking, child pornography, abduction, and online grooming. The ICMEC Asia Pacific Office fosters partnerships to fight child sexual exploitation and abuse. Its primary focus has been to fight online child sexual abuse and exploitation, by expanding the Financial Coalition Against Child Pornography.

ICMEC Australia works to bring together government, LEA’s, NGOs and commercial entities to develop relationships and discuss collaborative actions to reduce the volume of child exploitation crimes within and from Australia. Established in 2021, ICMEC Australia focuses on delivering data collaborative initiatives and best practices that enhance the detection and investigation of crimes against children online within the bounds of the law. Effective 06 July 2023, ICMEC Australia operates as a separate entity from ICMEC, though both parties retain relations and routinely collaborate on initiatives.

In addition, ICMEC has helped establish a number of national and regional centers, including Child Focus in Belgium, The Smile of the Child in Greece, the Romanian Center for Missing & Sexually Exploited Children (FOCUS), the South African Centre for Missing & Exploited Children, and the Southeastern European Centre for Missing and Exploited Children, which serves as a hub for 13 countries in the Balkan region.

== See also ==
- International Missing Children's Day
- Refugee children
- Street children
