= Mervyn Davies, Baron Davies of Abersoch =

British businessman

The Right Honourable The Lord Davies of Abersoch CBE JP
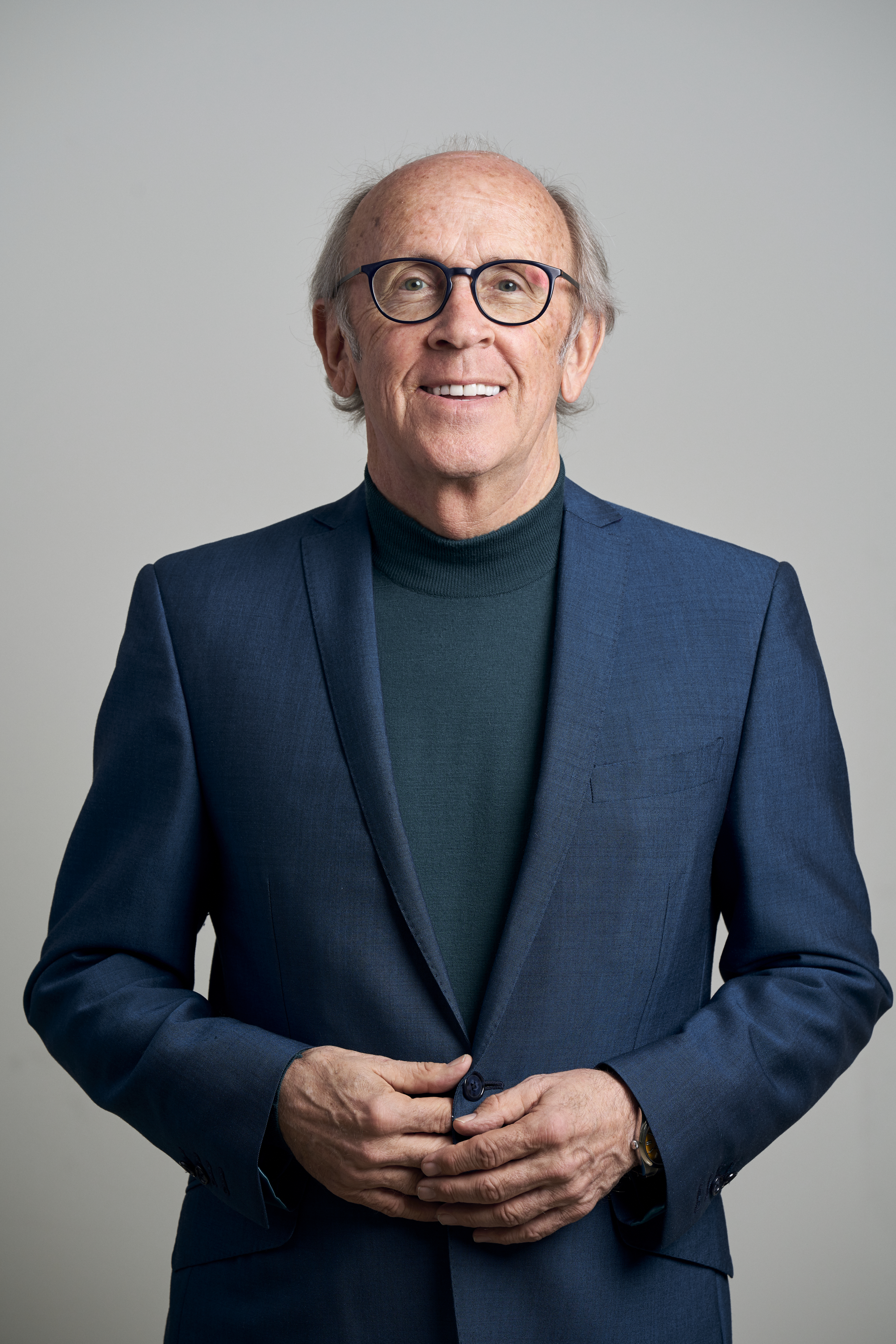

Minister of State for Trade, Investment and Business
- In office 14 January 2009 – 11 May 2010
- Prime Minister: Gordon Brown
- Preceded by: Gareth Thomas
- Succeeded by: Mark Prisk

Member of the House of Lords
- Lord Temporal
- Life peerage 2 February 2009

Personal details
- Born: Evan Mervyn Davies; 21 November 1952 (age 73)
- Party: None (non-affiliated)
- Other political affiliations: Labour (former)

Evan Mervyn Davies, Baron Davies of Abersoch, CBE JP (born 21 November 1952) is a British former banker, and was a Labour government minister until May 2010, as Minister of State for Trade, Investment and Small Business. He is co-chair of the UAE-UK Business Council, and a former UK government Trade Envoy for Sri Lanka. Prior to government appointments, he was a director, chief executive and chair of Standard Chartered for 12 years.

Davies is the chairman of L1 Holdings, on the advisory board of Teneo, and chair of the advisory board for Consello, alongside roles as chair of both the GlyndebourneOpera House and Hauser & Wirth's Artfarm. He is also a former chairman of the Lawn Tennis Association (LTA), concluding his tenure following the 2025 Wimbledon Championships, and was an honorary professor at Cardiff Business School. He is also on the World Rugby Executive Committee, In May 2025, Davies became one of the four co-owners of the Salford City Football Club (SCFC), and is co-chair of the club's board.

== Early life ==
Davies was born on 21 November 1952. He was raised in Colwyn Bay, Wales in a Welsh-speaking household. He was educated at Rydal Penrhos in North Wales.

== Career ==
Davies started his career in banking at Midland Bank where his father was a bank manager, before moving to Citibank where is worked for 10 years, and then to Standard Chartered in 1993. Davies was Chairman of Standard Chartered PLC between November 2006 and January 2009, having been Chief executive between 2001 and 2006 and a director since 1997.

Since 2010, Davies has held executive roles on the board of Corsair Capital LLC, a private equity investor, where he was the chairman and a partner. Chairman until 2022, he remains a senior advisor. Davies also spent 10 years as a non-executive director at Diageo, serving as senior director and chair of the company's remuneration committee during that time. He was named the chairman of Intermediate Capital Group (ICG) in 2019 and NESsT in 2021.

From 2014, he was chairman of Jack Wills, a fashion business. In August 2016 Sky News reported that Davies was to stand down as Jack Wills was taken over in a private equity transaction involving Bluegem taking a minority stake in the company following reported losses.

In November 2013, Davies became chairman of the Garden Bridge Trust, planning a bridge over the Thames in London, just 200m from Waterloo Bridge. The bridge was intended to be built largely from privately donated funds, but on 26 July 2016 the BBC reported that Davies had approached the Secretary of State for Transport seeking an extension of a £15m government underwriting commitment until September 2017. £37.7m had been spent on preliminary works, but construction of the bridge had not started and was being delayed until the autumn of 2016. However, the project was subsequently further delayed, and construction of the bridge did not start in 2016. In January 2017 the Garden Bridge Trust lodged its accounts with Companies House but was unable to classify itself as a going concern, due to uncertainties about the funding and planning permissions needed for the bridge. Davies insisted that the Garden Bridge Trust expected to start construction "in 2017", but the project was scrapped in August of that year, having spent taxpayers' funds of £50m.

In May 2015 Davies was appointed deputy chairman of the LetterOne Group, an investment business in the energy, technology and telecom sectors. He became the non-executive chairman of the board of directors of both L1 Holdings and L1 Investment Holdings. In March 2022, LetterOne froze the shareholdings of two EU sanctioned directors and removed them from its board, leaving Davies in control of the firm. Denouncing the Russian invasion of Ukraine, Davies stated that LetterOne would donate US$150 million and all dividends for the "foreseeable future" to Ukrainian relief efforts. Later that month, Davies oversaw the appointment of Franz Humer to the LetterOne board. Davies personally invested in the software startup Configur in June 2022.

In May 2025, Davies became a part-owner of English football club Salford City, as part of a consortium including former players David Beckham and Gary Neville.

== Public appointments ==
Davies was appointed a Commander of the Order of the British Empire (CBE) in the 2002 Birthday Honours "for services to British financial interests and the community, Hong Kong." In 2004, he was appointed a Justice of the Peace in Hong Kong.

He was made a life peer on 2 February 2009 as Baron Abersoch, of Abersoch in the County of Gwynedd, with ministerial posts in the Foreign & Commonwealth Office and in the Department of Business, Innovation and Skills. He later held posts in Business, Enterprise and Regulatory Reform and in Trade, Investment and Small Business and was Trade Envoy to Sri Lanka, succeeded by Lord Hannett of Everton in January 2025.

== Personal life ==
Davies married Jeanne Marie Gammie in 1979. They have a son and a daughter.

Davies speaks Welsh. He is a member of The Arts Club. He is a Trustee of the Royal Academy of Arts Development Trust, and is a keen tennis player.

== Arms ==
Coat of arms of Mervyn Davies, Baron Davies of Abersoch
Crest A demi-goat Argent and unguled Or supporting between the feet a gavel head upwards Azure. Escutcheon Azure a barrulet dancetty of two points upwards engrailed on the upper edge Or between three roundels Argent one and two over all issuing in base a pile engrailed Or thereon a pile Azure charged with a roundel Argent. Motto Trwy Fentro Mae Llwydd

Orders of precedence in the United Kingdom
Preceded by The Lord Pannick	Gentlemen; Baron Davies of Abersoch	Followed by The Lord Freud
