= The Smile of the Child =

Child welfare organization in Athens, Greece

The Smile of the Child (Greek: Το Χαμόγελο του παιδιού) is a voluntary, non-profit child welfare organization based in Athens, Greece.

== Establishment ==
In December 1995, a large number of the Greek public watched the TV show Red Card, which featured the 18-month struggle of ten-year-old Andreas Giannopoulos, who was fighting to stay alive after suffering from a serious medical condition. This provided the impetus for the creation of The Smile of the Child. In January 1996, The Smile of the Child was registered as a non-profit, non-governmental organisation. The association continues to expand to meet the serious problems of children in need living in Greece.

== Activities ==
The Smile of the Child organises bazaars, concerts, cultural and sports events aiming to assist children in need and their families.

== Funds ==
The organization is supported financially mainly by a number of companies in Greece and elsewhere. The Hellenic Police and Elpida (Hope) are two such organizations that have supported The Smile of the Child.

== International partners ==
The Smile of the Child collaborates with international organizations such as the International Centre for Missing & Exploited Children (ICMEC), the European Federation for Missing and Exploited Children, Child Help Online, the European Federation for Street Children, and the US's National Center for Missing and Exploited Children.

As of October 2010, The Southeastern European Centre for Missing and Exploited Children was inaugurated, as a joint initiative of ICMEC and The Smile of the Child.

== See also ==
- ActionAid
