= Franz Humer =

Swiss-Austrian businessman

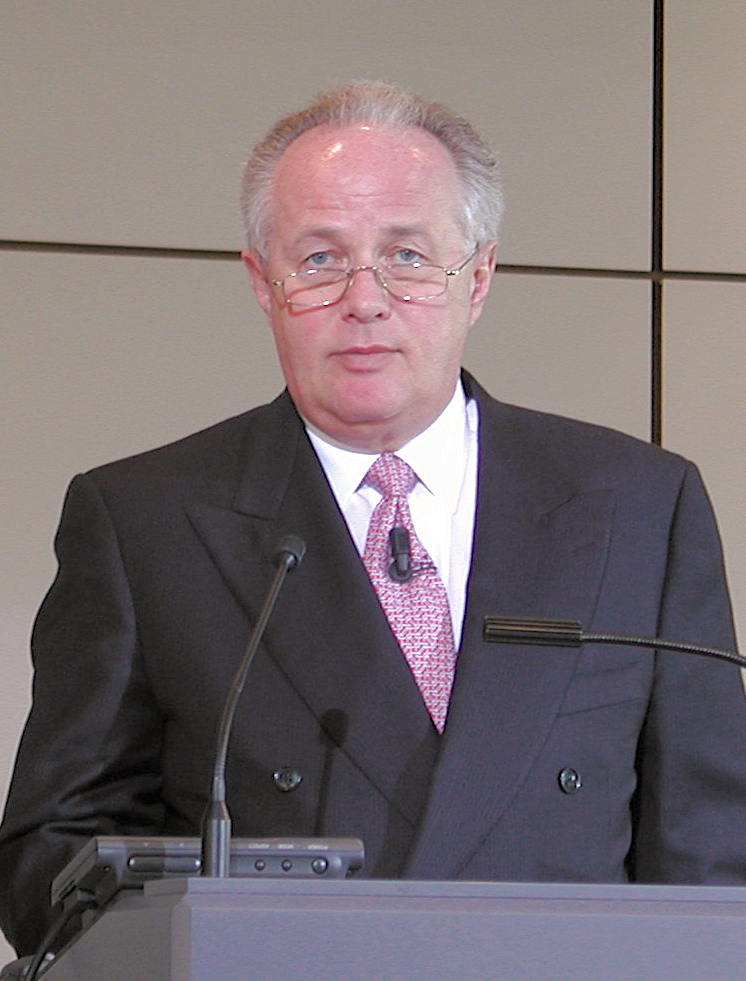
- Born: Franz Bernhard Humer; 1 July 1946 (age 79); Salzburg
- Occupation: Businessman
- Years active: 1967–present
- Title: Former chairman of Roche and Diageo plc
- Board member of: Roche, Diageo, Citigroup, International Centre for Missing & Exploited Children (ICMEC; Chairman)

Franz Bernhard Humer (born 1 July 1946, in Salzburg, Austria) is a Swiss-Austrian businessman, and the former chairman of Diageo, and of Roche.

== Life and career ==
Humer studied law at the University of Innsbruck and later obtained a doctorate in law. He also earned a master's degree in business from INSEAD in Fontainebleau.

Between 1973 and 1995, Humer worked for pharmaceutical companies Schering-Plough and Glaxo in various countries.

He became a member of the board of directors and head of the pharmaceuticals division of the Swiss pharmaceutical company Roche in 1995. From 1996 until 1998 he was COO of Roche, then CEO until 2008, when Severin Schwan took over. Additionally, he was chairman from 2001 to 2014.

Humer was chairman of Reed Elsevier from July 2008 to September 2010, when he was succeeded by Anthony Habgood.

He was chairman of Diageo, a British multinational alcoholic beverages company, until January 2017, when he was succeeded by Javier Ferrán.

Humer is married and lives in Erlenbach, Switzerland. He obtained Swiss citizenship in 1989.

== Other ==
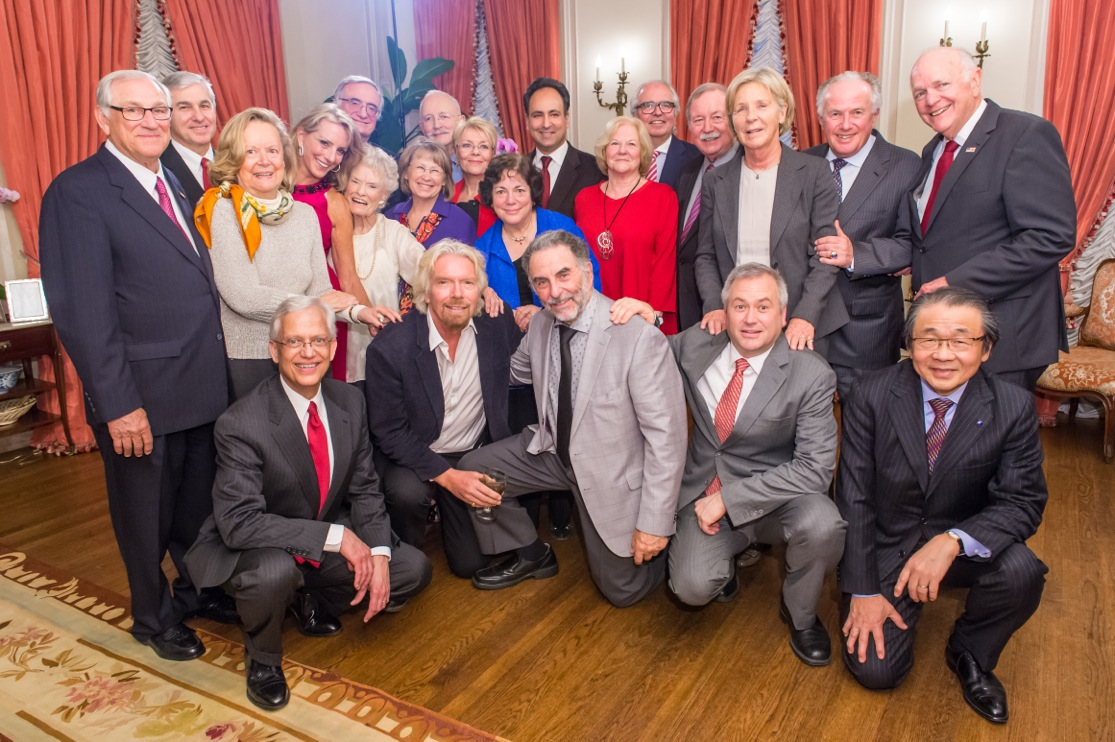
Franz Humer, Chairman, (top row, second from end on far right) with the board of directors of the International Centre for Missing & Exploited Children

Humer was chairman of the International Centre for Missing & Exploited Children, a global non-profit organization that combats child sexual exploitation, child pornography, and child abduction. Humer was chairman at the INSEAD school of business from 2008 to 2014.

== Honors ==
- 2000: Grand Decoration of Honour in Gold for Services to the Republic of Austria
- 2006: Grand Decoration of Honour in Gold with Star for Services to the Republic of Austria
- 2014: Public Service Star (Distinguished Friends of Singapore)
- 2016: Honorary Senator of the University of Salzburg
- Honorary doctorate from the Faculty of Philosophy and Natural Sciences at the University of Basel
- Honorary doctorate from the London School of Pharmacy
