= Orca (disambiguation) =

Orca is another name for a killer whale, the world's biggest dolphin species.

Orca, ORCA or Orcas may also refer to:

== People ==
- Quintus Valerius Orca (fl. 50s–40s B.C.), Roman praetor and officer under Julius Caesar

== Places ==
- Orca Basin, a mini-basin in the northern Gulf of Mexico
- Orca Bay (Alaska), a bay near the town of Cordova
- Orca (carbon capture plant), facility that uses direct air capture to remove carbon dioxide from the atmosphere
- Orca gas field, a North Sea gas field
- Orca Inlet, serves as an inlet to Prince William Sound from the Gulf of Alaska
- Orcas Island, the largest of the San Juan Islands in Washington state
  - Orcas Island Airport, the correspondent airport of the island
  - Orcas Village, Washington (sometimes just called Orcas), a community on the island
- Sandford Orcas, a village and parish in north west Dorset, England

== Arts and entertainment ==
=== Fictional characters and vehicles ===
- Orca (DC Comics), the name of two different comic book characters
- Orca (.hack), a character in the .hack video game series
- Orca, a fictional fishing vessel in the 1975 film Jaws

=== Film ===
- Orca (1977 film), a horror film
- Orca (2020 film), a Swedish drama film

=== Literature ===
- Orca (novel), a 1996 fantasy novel by Steven Brust

=== Music ===
- Orcas (duo), a Pacific Northwest duo
- Orca (C-Bo album), 2012
- Orca Symphony No. 1, an album by Serj Tankian
- "Orca", a song by Deadmau5, from his 2006 album Vexillology and 2009 compilation album At Play Vol. 2
- Orca, an album by Gus Dapperton

== Organizations ==
- Opinion Research Center of Afghanistan
- Orca Air, a 1996–2003 Egyptian regional airline
- Orca Airways, a 2005–2018 small scheduled and charter airline based in Vancouver, British Columbia, Canada
- Orca Engineering, a Swiss sports car manufacturing company
- Orca (company), a New Zealand wetsuit and sports apparel manufacturer
- Otonabee Region Conservation Authority, a conservation authority in Ontario, Canada

== Technology and computing ==
- The Online Representations and Certifications Application website, now superseded by the US government's System for Award Management
- Orca, a Windows Installer database editor
- Orca (assistive technology), part of the free and open source GNOME desktop environment
- ORCA (quantum chemistry program)
- Orcas, the codename for Visual Studio 2008
- Oscillation Research with Cosmics in the Abyss, part of the KM3NeT neutrino telescope
- ORCA (computer system), a "get out the vote" application created by Mitt Romney's 2012 U.S. presidential campaign

== Transportation ==
- Orca (supercar), a Swiss supercar
- ORCA card, a smart card for public transit in the central Puget Sound region of Washington State, USA
- Orca-class patrol vessel, a class of training vessels for the Canadian Navy
- USS Orca, several United States Navy ships
- Orca (AUV), autonomous underwater vehicle under development by Boeing and Huntington Ingalls Industries

== Other ==
- Orca (dog) (2001–2014), a golden retriever and winner of the PDSA Gold Medal
- Omni Role Combat Aircraft (ORCA), an Indian aircraft development program
- Seattle Orcas, a team in Major League Cricket

== See also ==
- Orka (character), a villain in the Marvel comic books
- Orc, a fictional humanoid monster
- AUKUS, a trilateral security pact
- Orcas (disambiguation)
