= Orcas (disambiguation) =

Orcas are the world's largest living dolphin species.

Orcas may also refer to:

- Orcas (album), the self-titled debut full-length album from American dreampop duo Orcas
- Orcas (duo), musical collaboration between Pacific Northwest minimalist composer Rafael Anton Irisarri and multi-instrumentalist singer-songwriter Benoit Pioulard.
- Orcas Island, the largest of the San Juan Islands of the Pacific Northwest, United States
- Orcas Village, an unincorporated community at the southeastern corner of the West Sound watershed, Washington, United States
- Seattle Orcas, an American professional Twenty20 cricket

== See also ==
- Orca (disambiguation)
- Orcas, Washington
