= Sensorimotor (album) =

Studio album by Lusine
- Released: March 3, 2017
- Genre: Experimental
- Length: 53:26
- Label: Ghostly International
- Producer: Jeff McIlwain

Lusine chronology
Arterial Reworks (2015)	Sensorimotor (2017)	Sensorimotor Remixes (2017)

Singles from Sensorimotor
- 1. "Just a Cloud" Released: January 10, 2017; 2. "Won't Forget" Released: February 14, 2017

Sensorimotor is a studio album by American musician Lusine, released on March 3, 2017, through Ghostly International.

== Background and release ==
Sensorimotor was announced on January 10, 2017, four years after Lusine's previous album on Ghostly International, The Waiting Room. The same day, a single, "Just a Cloud", featuring Vilja Larjosto, was released. On February 12, a second single, "Won't Forget", was released, also featuring Larjosto. Sensorimotor was released on March 3, 2017. A music video for "Just a Cloud" was premiered by Vice on March 30, which used a custom lighting rig featuring 2,300 LEDs and was directed by Michael Reisinger in collaboration with Alex Borton. A remix album, Sensorimotor Remixes, was released on September 15, 2017.

== Reception ==
Professional ratings
Aggregate scores
Source	Rating
Metacritic	73/100
Review scores
Source	Rating
AllMusic	4/5 stars
The A.V. Club	B
Exclaim!	6/10
PopMatters	6/10

According to review aggregator Metacritic, Sensorimotor received "generally favorable reviews" from critics. A reviewer wrote to Mojo that the album contains "[b]ig, warm music that doesn't shout loud, yet makes itself heard." Timothy Monger of AllMusic said that, with the album, Lusine "takes another evolutionary step forward, seeming strangely natural in his skin of manipulation." A reviewer for The Wire said that the album "settles into a solid groove of high end electro pop with just enough dust to keep it grounded." A The A.V. Club writer described it as a "pleasant, if unmoving slice of electro ambience". Exclaim!'s Will Pearson thought the album wasn't as strong as other Lusine albums released through Ghostly. Landon MacDonald of PopMatters said the album "is an exercise in doing many things well but nothing truly great."

== Track listing ==
All music is composed by Jeff McIlwain.

No.	Title	Lyrics	Length
1.	"Canopy"		4:38
2.	"Ticking Hands" (featuring Sarah McIlwain)	McIlwain	4:47
3.	"Slow Motion"		4:49
4.	"Just a Cloud" (featuring Vilja Larjosto)	Larjosto	5:32
5.	"The Level"		5:41
6.	"Witness" (featuring Benoît Pioulard)	Pioulard	4:24
7.	"Chatter"		1:41
8.	"Won't Forget" (featuring Vilja Larjosto)	Larjosto	5:09
9.	"Flyway"		6:02
10.	"Tropopause"		3:35
11.	"The Lift"		7:08
Total length:			53:26

== Personnel ==
- Jeff McIlwain — writer, producer
- Sarah McIlwain — vocals, lyrics ("Ticking Hands")
- Vilja Larjosto — vocals, lyrics ("Just a Cloud", "Won't Forget")
- Benoît Pioulard — vocals, lyrics ("Witness")
- Rafael Anton Irisarri — mastering
- Andy Gilmore — artwork
- Wade Jeffree — design

== Release history ==
Release history for Sensorimotor
Region	Date	Format(s)	Label
Worldwide	March 3, 2017	CD; Digital download; streaming; vinyl	Ghostly International
