= Orcas (album) =

O R C A S

Studio album by Orcas
- Released: April 13, 2012
- Recorded: 2010–2011, Seattle, Washington
- Genre: dreampop, ambient pop
- Length: 43:03
- Label: Morr Music

Professional ratings
Review scores
Source	Rating
AllMusic	link
Pitchfork Media	link
Tiny Mix Tapes	link

O R C A S is the self-titled debut full-length album from American dreampop duo Orcas.

== Track listing ==
1. "Pallor Cedes"
2. "Arrow Drawn"
3. "Standard Error"
4. "Carrion"
5. "A Subtle Escape"
6. "Until Then (Broadcast cover)"
7. "Certain Abstractions"
8. "I Saw My Echo"
9. "High Fences"

== Credits ==
- Benoît Pioulard - vox, guitars, piano, glockenspiel, field recordings, warnophone & harmonium
- Rafael Anton Irisarri - laptop, guitars, bass & sampler

Additional Personnel:

- Jesy Fortino - vocal samples on "Standard Error" and "Certain Abstractions"
- Scott Morgan - drone loop on "Certain Abstractions"
- Simon Scott - Max/MSP treatments & additional guitars on "A Subtle Escape" and "I Saw My Echo"
- Kelly Wyse - Piano on "Standard Error", "I Saw My Echo" & "Certain Abstractions"
- Photography/Artwork by Sean Curtis Patrick / The Attempted Theft of Millions
- Design by Julia Guther
