= Précis =

Précis (/ˈpreɪsi/) or precis may refer to:

- an abridgement or summary
  - Critical précis, a type of written text
  - IRAC case brief, in law
- Précis (album), a 2006 music album
- Precis (butterfly), a genus of butterflies
- Mitsubishi Precis, a make of car
- Precis Neumann, a character in the PlayStation game Star Ocean: The Second Story
- PRECIS (Providing Regional Climates for Impacts Studies), a regional climate model

== See also ==
- Preci, an Italian commune in Perugia
- Prezi, an American video and visual communications software company
- Praeses, a title for presiding officials, first used in ancient Rome
