= Wintershall Dea =

German gas and oil producer

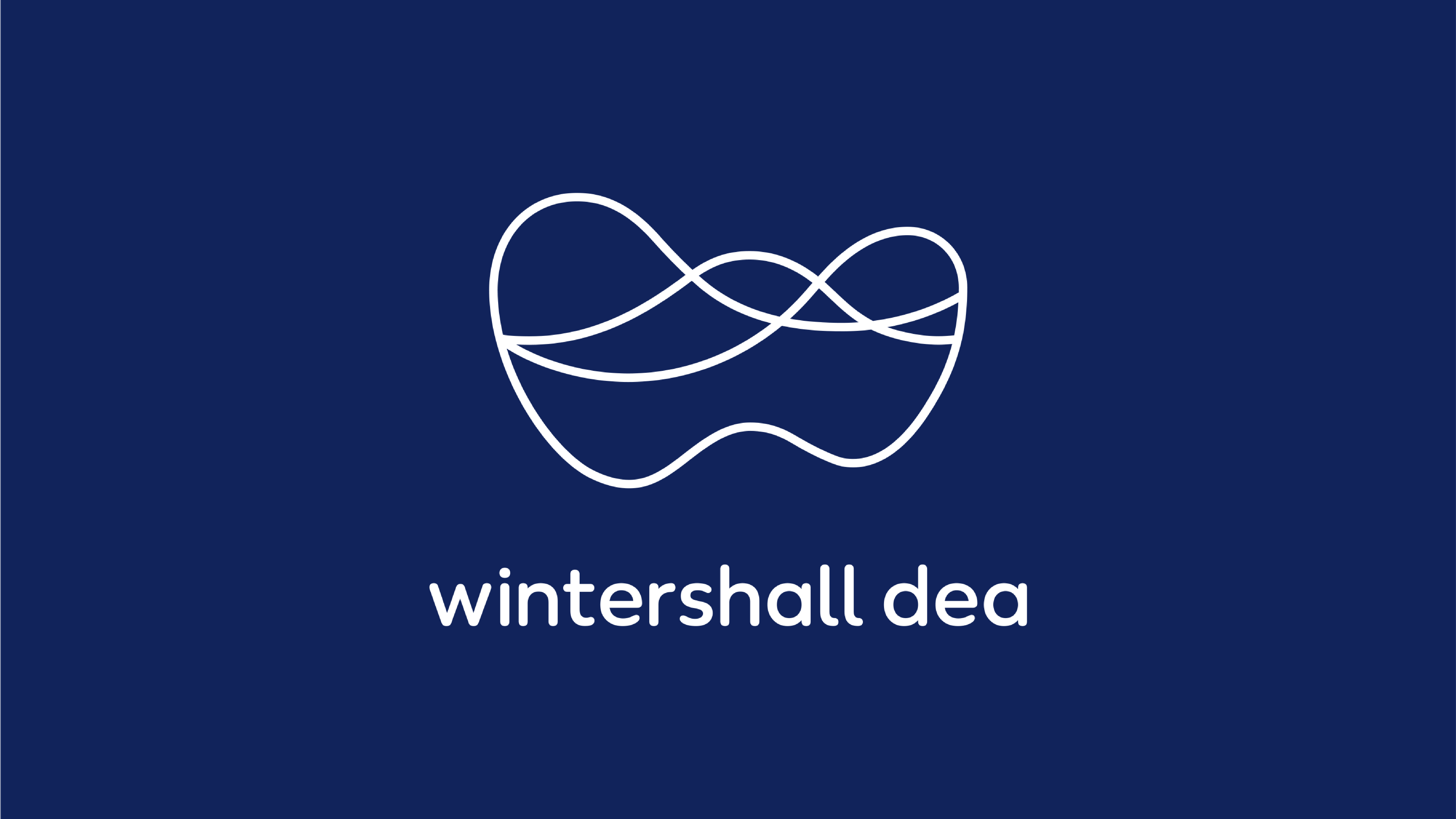
- Company type: Private
- Industry: Gas and oil (exploration and production)
- Predecessors: Wintershall; DEA AG
- Founded: 1894 (Wintershall), 1899 (DEA, as Deutsche Tiefbohr-Aktiengesellschaft, DTA)
- Founders: Carl Julius Winter, Heinrich Grimberg (Wintershall), Rudolf Nöllenburg (first Managing Director of DTA)
- Headquarters: Kassel and Hamburg, Germany
- Areas served: Northern Europe, Russia, Latin America, Middle East and North Africa
- Key people: Mario Mehren (CEO); Hugo Dijkgraaf (CTO); Paul Smith (CFO); Thilo Wieland (Region Russia, Latin America and Transportation and Interim Responsible MENA)
- Production output: Natural gas: 445.000 BOE; Crude oil: 172.000 BOE (excluding Libya onshore due to the change to EPSA contracts)
- Revenue: €5.9 billion (2019)
- Operating income: €2.8 billion (2019)
- Number of employees: 2,847 (2019)
- Website: wintershalldea.com

Wintershall Dea GmbH is a German gas and oil producer. The joint venture was created in May 2019 by the merger between Wintershall Holding GmbH and DEA Deutsche Erdoel AG. BASF SE has a 67% stake in it, with the other 33% being held by LetterOne, whose main ultimate owner is the Russian business magnate Mikhail Fridman. As of 2020 it was planning listing on the Frankfurt Stock Exchange.

In 2021, Wintershall Dea was ranked no. 25 out of 120 oil, gas, and mining companies involved in resource extraction north of the Arctic Circle in the Arctic Environmental Responsibility Index (AERI).

== History ==
Wintershall was founded in 1894 and DEA was founded five years later as Deutsche Tiefbohr-Actiengesellschaft. The two companies began to work together more intensively since the 1950s. In 1952, Wintershall and DEA acquired the majority in Deutsche Gasolin AG which later merged with its sister company Aral AG in connection with the construction of the Emsland oil refinery. Another consequence of their collaboration was the joint establishment of Germany's only offshore drilling platform Mittelplate in the Wadden Sea, which began production in 1987.

On 27 September 2018, the respective parent companies of Wintershall and DEA, namely BASF and LetterOne, announced the binding contract for the merger of their daughter companies. Wintershall Dea was created on 1 May 2019 through the merger of Wintershall and DEA.

In August 2020, Wintershall Dea signed a cooperation memorandum with Sonatrach of Algeria.

In December 2023, an agreement was signed for the acquisition of Wintershall Dea by the British gas and oil production company Harbour Energy for $11.2 billion. The transaction is expected to be completed in the fourth quarter of 2024. As part of the transaction, both BASF and LetterOne will receive shares (39.6% and 14.9%, respectively) in Harbour Energy as payment. The German headquarters in Hamburg and Kassel will be closed after the completion.

== Operations ==
As of 2019 Wintershall Dea operated in the field of gas and oil exploration and production in 13 countries in Europe, Latin America, the Middle East, North Africa and Russia with headquarters in Kassel and Hamburg. As of 2019 it employed around 2,800 people worldwide. Its chief executive officer has been Mario Mehren. According to Wintershall DEA's pro forma figures, revenues and other income amounted to €5.9 billion in 2019.

As of 2020 Wintershall Dea owned 40% of the Bergknapp prospect. It has also been the operator of the prospect.

=== Russia ===
As of 2020 the company had numerous gas assets in Russia and was a key factor in financing the Nord Stream 2 project, lending substantial sums to the Russian state-owned energy giant Gazprom. On the eve of Russia's invasion of Ukraine in February 2022, DEA advocated against punitive measures on Russia that focused on gas supply and pipelines. When Germany suspended Nord Stream 2 due to Russia's invasion, DEA argued that it should be compensated for its €730 million investment in the pipeline.

Mikhail Fridman, Russian oligarch and prominent enabler of the Vladimir Putin regime in Russia, has been a minority shareholder in DEA.

In January 2023, about one year after the Russian invasion of Ukraine, Wintershall Dea stopped its business operations in Russia with an estimated loss of 1.4 billion Euros. The Russian side had allegedly plundered the bank accounts of partnership projects and the Russian state effectively seized profits generated since March 2022. Several of Wintershall Deas lost investments in Russia were secured by German government guarantees.

In December 2023 a Russian presidential decree gave the government the power to confiscate and forcibly sell off assets belonging to European energy firms including shares in the Yuzhno-Russkoye oil and gas field, currently owned by Austria’s OMV and Wintershall Dea.

== Bibliography ==
- Rainer Karlsch, Raymond G. Stokes: Faktor Öl. Die Mineralölwirtschaft in Deutschland 1859-1974. (“The Factor Oil: The Mineral Oil industry in Germany from 1859 to 1974 (German Only)) C. H. Beck, Munich 2003, ISBN 978-3-406-50276-7
