= Mittelplate =

German offshore oil field

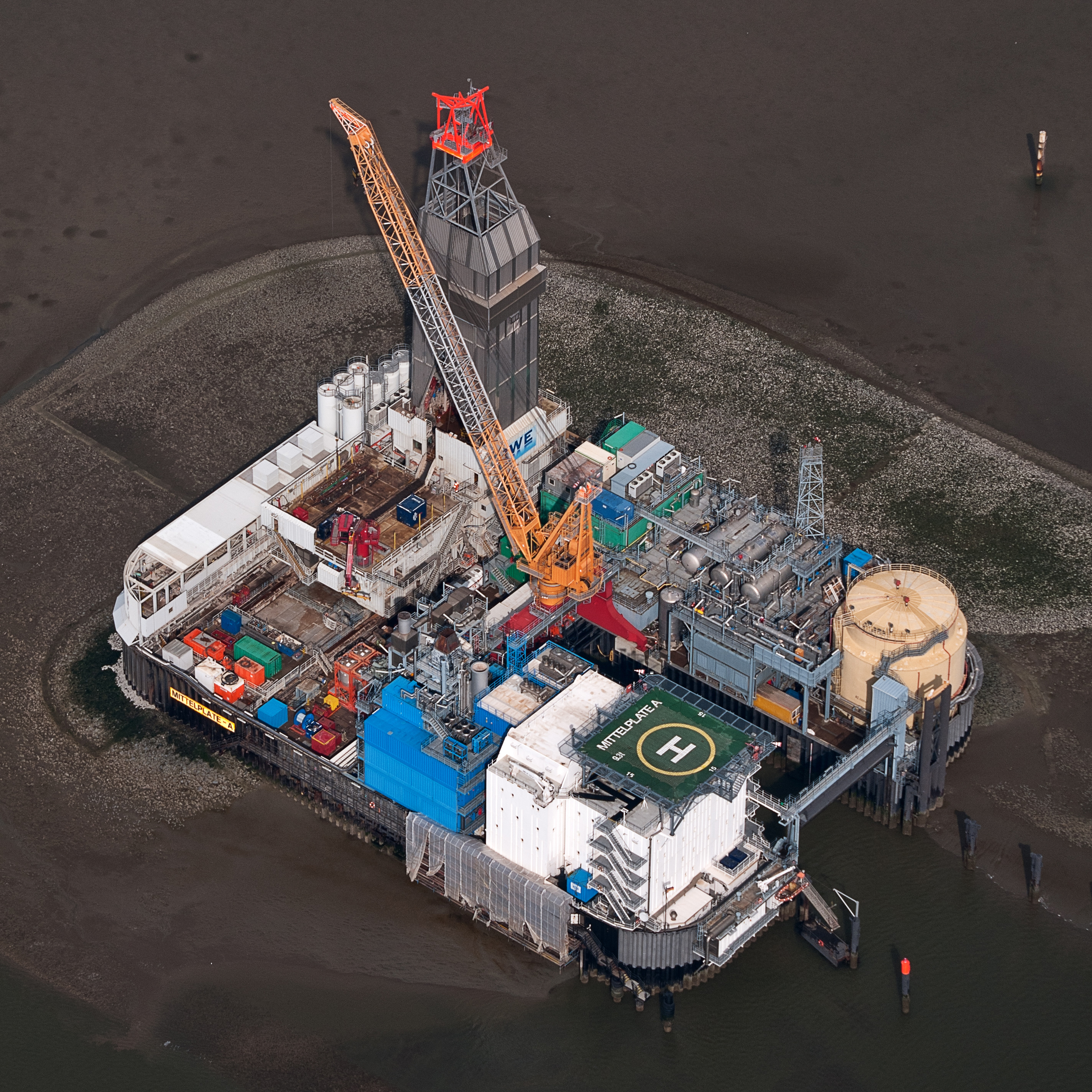

- Location within North Sea
- Country: Germany
- Offshore/onshore: Offshore
- Coordinates: 54.0259°N 8.731°E
- Operator: Wintershall Dea
- Owner: Wintershall Dea

Field history
- Discovery: 1981
- Start of production: 1987

Production
- Producing formations: Middle Jurassic

Mittelplate is Germany's largest oil field, 7 km (4.3 mi) from the shore, in the environmentally important Schleswig-Holstein Wadden Sea National Parks tidal flats. The development of the field was done by a consortium of RWE Dea and Wintershall. By the 20th anniversary of the start of production, 20 million tonnes (22,000,000 tons) (about 146 million barrels) of crude had been produced from the field. Mittelplate field holds nearly 65% of Germany's crude oil reserves.

== History ==
The field was discovered in 1981 through the Mittelplate 1 well, which confirmed that the reservoir contained 75 million tonnes (83,000,000 tons) of crude oil. As early as the 1950s, geologists suspected the presence of oil off the German coast. Preliminary test drilling in the 1960s did indeed turn up indications of oil, though not in economically profitable quantities. The oil crisis of 1973 and 1979 raised awareness of indigenous oil sources. In 1980 and 1981, exploration wells in the Mittelplate vicinity found oil in several sandstone layers. Due to the location of the field in an ecologically sensitive area, hydrographic, hydrodynamic and meteorological studies modelling storm, wave and ice-flow conditions were done, with the result that an artificial island holding a drilling and production facility was built in 1985.

== Geology ==
The oil in the Mittelplate field is trapped in Dogger (Middle Jurassic) sandstones of uppermost Aalenian to lowermost Callovian in age. The five main sandstone reservoir units, known from oldest to youngest as the alpha-sand, beta-sand, gamma-sand, delta-sand and epsilon-sand, are separated by intervening sandy claystones, not of reservoir quality. The trap is formed on the flank of the Büsum salt dome, with the hydrocarbons sealed up-dip by the edge of the salt dome. The overall top seal is provided by Lower Cretaceous mudstones. The source rock for the oil found at Mittelplate is thought to be the underlying Lower Jurassic Liassic organic-rich claystone.

== Technical features ==
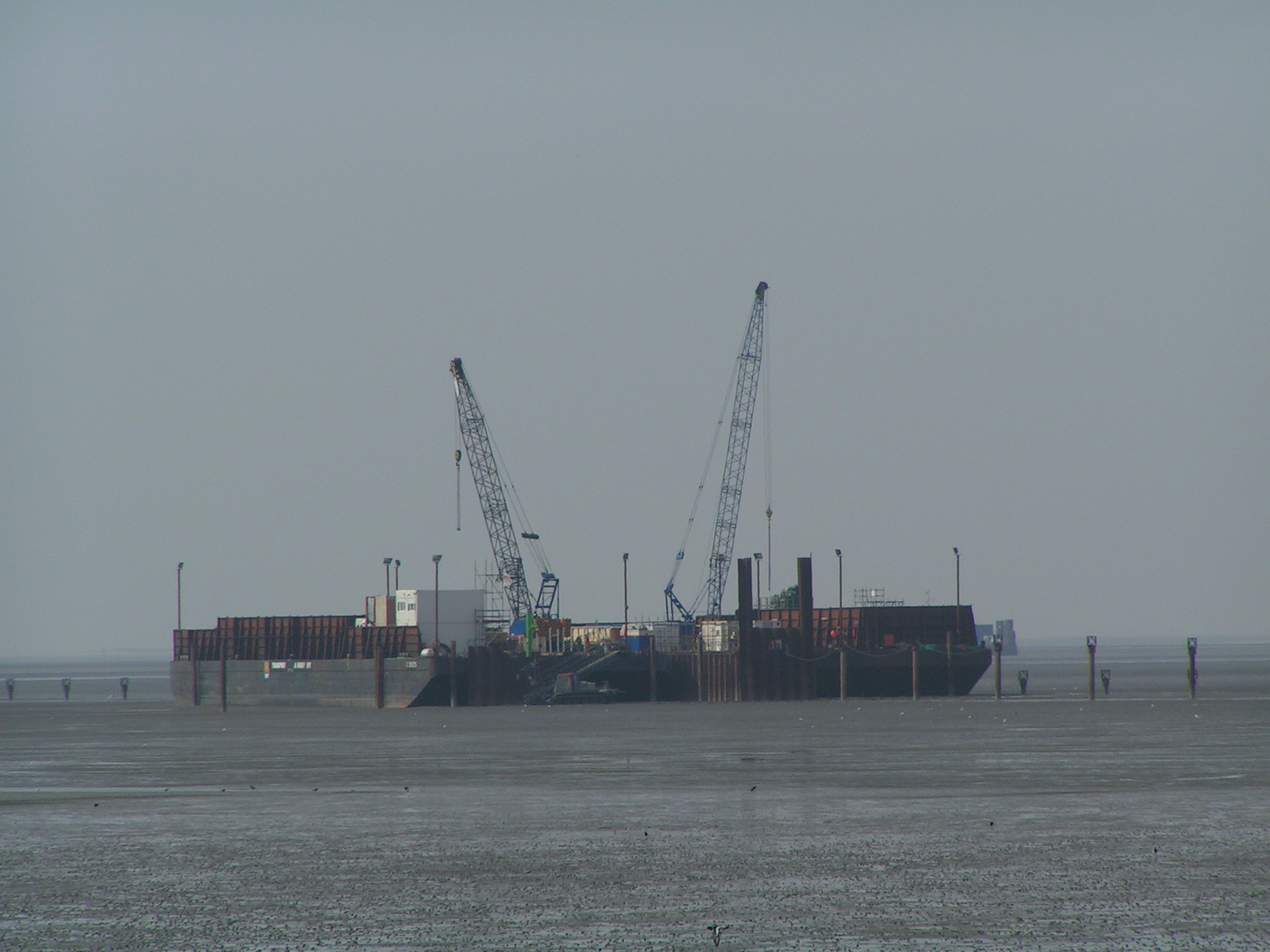
Mittelplate pipeline construction in the tidal flats

The island is protected by 11-metre-high (36 ft) sheet piling measures at 70 by 95 m (230 by 312 ft). The western section of the field includes 18 production wells. The first oil came onstream in 1987 and was delivered ashore on 45 by 18 m (148 by 59 ft) double hull barges. A new redevelopment plan included the construction of a land-based facility in Dieksand from which 2,000–3,000 m-long (6,600–9,800 ft) extended-reach production wells were to tap into the eastern part of the field. As per the development program, a pilot well and seven high-tech extended-reach wells measuring at 7,727 m (25,351 ft), 8,284 m (27,178 ft), 8,367 m (27,451 ft), 8,995 m (29,511 ft), 9,275 m (30,430 ft), 8,450 m (27,720 ft), 8,672 m (28,451 ft) and a 4-kilometre (2.5 mi) section cutting through the Büsum salt diapir were to ensure a faster exploitation of the field. The redevelopment plan also included construction of 7.5 km (4.7 mi) pipelines from the island to Friedrichskoog-Spitze and a 2.8 km (1.7 mi) pipeline to the Dieksand Land Station. This was expected to enable the Mittelplate consortium to transport up to 1 million tonnes or 7,550,000 barrels (1,200,000 m^{3}) of oil a year. Oil is pumped ashore and water extracted during processing is then routed back by the second pipeline for reinjection into the lower section of the reservoir. The modified island facility now contains living accommodation for up to 96 people.

== Ownership ==
The Mittelplate is operated and solely owned by Wintershall Dea. Out of a total capital spending of €670 million, €100 million was spent on construction of the pipeline transporting crude oil ashore and €50 million was spent on construction of a new T-150 drilling rig.

== Production ==
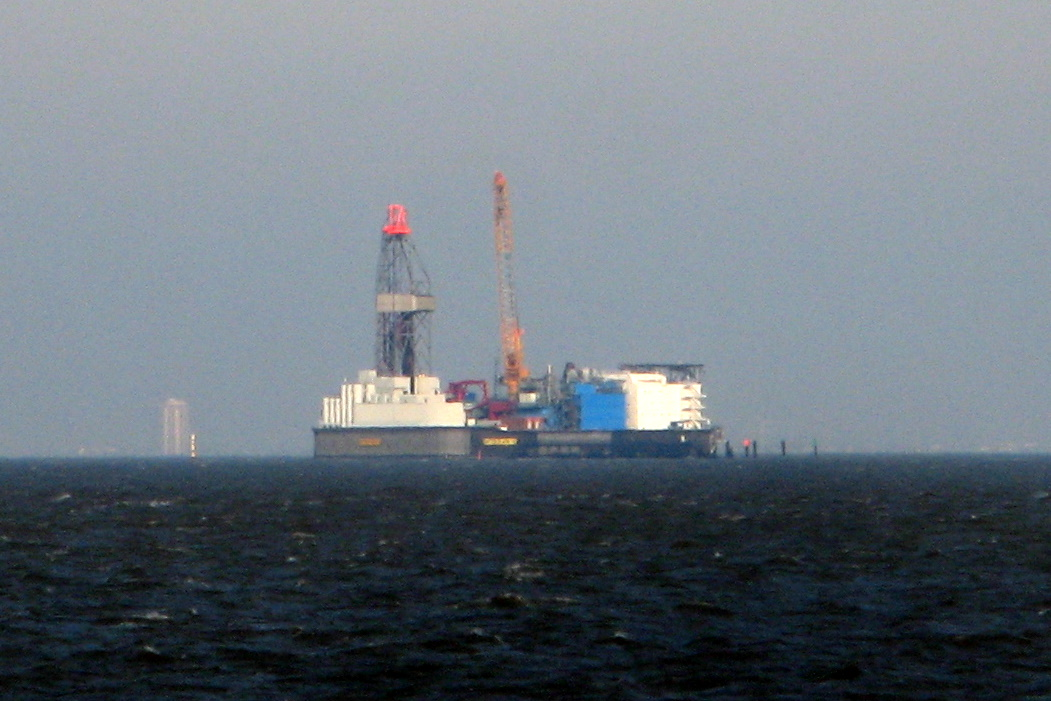
Mittelplate A as seen from the sea, in the background you can see the coast

Starting from October 1987, the field has been tapped in several sandstone layers at depths reaching 2,000–3,000 m (6,600–9,800 ft). The size of the deposit was adjusted upward to over 100 million tons, of which 15 million tons were extracted by June 2005. The annual production of Mittelplate Island amounts to 900,000 tons of oil (about 18,100 barrels of oil per day). Under prevailing conditions, about 40 million tons are still economically extractable. Since 2000, nearly horizontal wells (some up to about 9,200 metres [30,200 ft] long) have been extracting from the eastern part of the field directly from land on Dieksand / Friedrichskoog. The oil is piped from there to Brunsbüttel and onward to oil refineries in Hemmingstedt.

== Safety and environmental protection ==
The companies developing the field spent a substantial part of €670 million already invested over 20 years into industrial safety and environmental protection programs due to unique location of the field in Wattenmeer tidelands. Pipe-laying in the area and production in the field have been in accord with National Parks Law. However, Greenpeace along with World Wildlife Fund (WWF) have been active critics of the field development in Wattenmeer. The national park is home to nearly 4,000 species, 250 of which do not exist anywhere in the world but Wattenmeer. Up to 12 million migratory birds use the park—which is rich of mussels, worms, snails, and shrimp—as a resting place. Nearly 200,000 shelducks are believed to gather around the Elbe river estuary each summer.
