= Linewatch =

2008 film directed by Kevin Bray

- DVD cover
- Directed by: Kevin Bray
- Written by: David Warfield
- Produced by: Brad Krevoy; Reuben Liber; Karri O'Reilly
- Starring: Cuba Gooding Jr. Omari Hardwick; Evan Ross; Dean Norris; Malieek Straughter; AMG
- Cinematography: Paul Sommers
- Edited by: Robert Ivison
- Music by: Jeff McIlwain
- Production companies: Linewatch Productions; Motion Picture Corporation of America; Stage 6 Films
- Distributed by: Sony Pictures Home Entertainment
- Release date: October 21, 2008
- Running time: 90 minutes
- Country: United States
- Languages: English; Spanish
- Budget: $5 million

Linewatch is a 2008 American thriller film starring Cuba Gooding Jr., and directed by Kevin Bray. The film was released on direct-to-disc in the United States on October 21, 2008. Critic reviews were generally negative.

== Plot ==
Michael Dixon (Cuba Gooding Jr.) is an agent working linewatch for the United States Border Patrol on the U.S. Mexico Border in New Mexico. He is well-respected by his peers at US Border Patrol and loved by his wife Angela (Sharon Leal) and 5-year-old daughter Emily (Deja Warrior). Michael and his partner Luis DeSanto (Omar Paz Trujillo) discover a van full of dead illegal immigrants, and they go in search of the "coyote" who was leading them across before he left them for dead.

At the same time, Michael has to deal with a Minute Men-style militia led by Ron Spencer (Chris Browning). The search for the coyote leads Michael and Luis to a trailer, and results in a shootout where Luis gets shot.

During the ensuing chaos, Michael recognizes one of the suspects as Cook (Malieek Straughter), a member of the High Noon Gang (HNG) from Los Angeles. Years ago, Michael was a member of the HNG, until he turned on his back to the gang. The encounter along with Cook, who escapes, leads the HNG and its leader, Kimo (Omari Hardwick), to Michael.

It turns out that Michael has interfered with an HNG plot to bring drugs into the United States. Kimo threatens to kill Angela and Emily unless Mike agrees to use his Border Patrol connections to help the HNG bring in a drug shipment. Meanwhile, Michael would not able to help Kimo, but he realizes that, through the threats made against his family, that he has little choice. Michael is forced to find a way to protect his family from the High Noon Gang.

== Cast ==
- Cuba Gooding Jr. as Michael Dixon
- Omari Hardwick as Kimo
- Evan Ross as Little Boy
- Dean Norris as Warren Kane
- Malieek Straughter as Cook
- AMG as Stokes
- Sharon Leal as Angela Dixon
- Omar Paz Trujillo as Luis
- Chris Browning as Spencer
- William Sterchi as Simon
- Francisco Fernandez as Juan
- Jimmie Romero as Vargas
- Bryan Lane as Sam King
- Dan Burkarth as Jim Barnett
- Josh J. Coffman as Bill Krott

== Production ==
It is set and filmed in Albuquerque, New Mexico, on November 12 and December 13, 2007.

== Reception ==
The film has a score of 28% on Rotten Tomatoes.

== Home media ==
DVD was released in Region 1 in the United States on October 21, 2008, and also Region 2 in the United Kingdom on 3 November 2008, it was distributed by Sony Pictures Home Entertainment.
