= Hopes and Past Desires =

EP by Rafael Anton Irisarri
- Released: January 27, 2009
- Recorded: Seattle WA; Manchester, UK
- Genre: Ambient, minimalism
- Length: 14 minutes approximately
- Label: Immune

Rafael Anton Irisarri chronology
Daydreaming (2007)	Hopes and Past Desires (2009)	Reverie (Mini-LP) (2010)

Professional ratings
Review scores
Source	Rating
Delusions of Adequacy	link

Hopes and Past Desires is an EP by Rafael Anton Irisarri, pressed by American label Immune (distributed by Thrill Jockey). It was released worldwide as 7" vinyl on January 27, 2009.

== Track listing ==
All tracks written, arranged, and produced by Rafael Anton Irisarri, except Strings on Hopes and Past Desires (arranged, written and performed by Danny Norbury).

1. "Hopes and Past Desires"
2. "Watching As She Reels"

== Personnel ==
- Rafael Anton Irisarri — Production, mixing; synthesizer, piano, acoustic, electronic and non-conventional instruments
- Danny Norbury - Strings on Hopes and Past Desires
- Nan Schwarz - Cello on Watching As She Reels
- Paco Barba — Artwork design
