= Minke, Orca, Sillimanite and Wingate gas fields =

Dutch natural gas reservoirs in the North Sea

The Minke, Orca, Sillimanite and Wingate fields are natural gas reservoirs and gas production facilities in the southern North Sea; they are close to, or straddle, the United Kingdom / Netherlands median line. Natural gas, which is routed to the Netherlands, has been produced from the fields since 2007.

== The fields. ==
The Minke, Orca, Sillimanite and Wingate fields (UK Block 44) are located north of the Greater Markham Area gas fields (UK Block 49) which also straddles the UK / Netherlands median line.

Minke and Orca are named after species of whale, Sillimanite is named after a mineral. Details of the gas fields is summarised in the table.

Field data
Field name	Minke	Orca	Sillimanite	Wingate
Blocks	44/24a (UK) D15 (Netherlands)	44/24a, 44/29b, 44/30a (UK) D15b, D18a (Netherlands)	44/19a (UK) D12A, D12B (Netherlands)	44/24b (UK)
Year discovered	January 1993	December 1993	July 2015	2008
Original licensee	Wintershall	RWE Dea UK	Wintershall Noordzee	Wintershall
Gas reservoir	Carboniferous	Carboniferous	Carboniferous	Westphalian B sand bodies

== Development ==
The gas fields were developed by offshore platforms, subsea wellheads and pipelines. Details are summarised in the table.

Installations
Field	Minke	Orca	Sillimanite	Wingate
Block	44/24a (UK)	D18a (Netherlands)	D12 (Netherlands)	44/24b (UK)
Installation name	–	D18A-a	D12-B	Wingate
Installation type	Subsea wellhead	Fixed steel platform	Fixed steel platform	Fixed steel platform
Coordinates	54° 15.1300’N 2° 44.5067’E			54° 18.994’N 02° 37.176’E
Installed	2007	2013	2020	2011
Water depth, metres	32	54.3	41.5	29
Substructure weight, tonnes	26.75			900
Topsides weight, tonnes	–	1,240	4	950
No. of legs	–	4	–	4
No. of Wells	1	3		
Gas export to	D15-FA	D15-FA	D15-FA	D15-FA
Export pipeline length, diameter	3.7 km (UK) + 11.2 km (Netherlands), 8-inch	20 km, 8-inch	10 km	20.56 km, 12-inch
Pipeline number (gas)	PL2401			PL2850
Control umbilical/ methanol supply	From D15-FA	–		Methanol from D15-FA
Umbilical length, diameter	14.9 km, 90.6mm	–		20.56 km, 2-inch
Umbilical/Pipeline number (methanol)	PLU2402	–		PL2851

== Production ==
Gas production from the fields is summarised below.

Gas production
Field	Minke	Orca	Sillimanite	Wingate
Operator	GDF Britain then Neptune Energy	GDF SUEZ E&P	Wintershall Noordzee	Wintershall Noordzee
Start of production	June 2007	2013	2020	2011
Peak flow, million cubic metres/y	133	129		793
Year of peak flow	2007	2014		2012
Cumulative production to end of 2014, million cubic metres	150			1,321
Status	Production ceased 2010	Operational	Operational	Operational

Production from the Minke field in mcm
Production from the Orca field in mcm
Production from the Wingate field in mcm

== Decommissioning. ==
Neptune Energy submitted a Decommissioning Programme for Minke to the UK Oil and Gas Authority in 2019.

== See also ==
- Greater Markham Area gas fields
- List of oil and gas fields of the North Sea
