= Daydreaming (Rafael Anton Irisarri album) =

Studio album by Rafael Anton Irisarri
- Released: February 28, 2007
- Recorded: Seattle, WA
- Genre: Ambient, minimalism
- Length: Approximately 36 minutes
- Label: Miasmah

Rafael Anton Irisarri chronology
Daydreaming (2007)	Hopes and Past Desires (2009)

Professional ratings
Review scores
Source	Rating
Foxy Digitalis	7/10 stars
Groove	
Sound Proector	

Daydreaming is the debut album by Rafael Anton Irisarri, released by Norwegian label Miasmah. It was originally released worldwide as physical and digital album on February 28, 2007. The physical copies quickly became out of print. The album was very well received by the press and music community.

== Track listing ==
All tracks written, arranged, and produced by Rafael Anton Irisarri

1. "Waking Expectations"
2. "A Thousand-Yard Stare"
3. "Wither"
4. "Lumberton"
5. "Voigt-Kampf"
6. "Fractal"
7. "A Glimpse"
8. "She Dreams Alone" (Vinyl-only bonus track)

== Personnel ==
- Rafael Anton Irisarri — Production, mixing; synthesizer, piano, acoustic, electronic and non-conventional instruments
- Daniel C. Wictorson - Piano on Lumberton
- Nan Schwarz - Cello on She Dreams Alone
- Andreas Tilliander — Mastering
- Tomas Boden — Speldosa on A Glimpse, Liner Notes
- Erik K. Skodvin — Artwork design
