= Reverie (Rafael Anton Irisarri album) =

EP by Rafael Anton Irisarri
- Released: April 20, 2010
- Recorded: Seattle, Washington
- Genre: Post-minimalism
- Length: Approximately 24 minutes
- Label: Immune

Rafael Anton Irisarri chronology
Hopes and Past Desires (EP)	Reverie	The North Bend (LP)

Professional ratings
Review scores
Source	Rating
The Milk Factory	4.5/5 stars
De:Bug	

Reverie is a Mini-LP by Rafael Anton Irisarri, pressed by American label Immune (distributed by Thrill Jockey). It was released worldwide as 12" vinyl on April 20, 2010. It contains two original compositions and a 14-minute rendition of Arvo Pärt's tintinnabuli masterpiece Für Alina.

== Track listing ==
All tracks written, arranged, and produced by Rafael Anton Irisarri, except "Für Alina" (composed by Arvo Pärt)

1. "Lit a Dawn"
2. "Embraced"
3. "Für Alina"

== Personnel ==
- Rafael Anton Irisarri — Production, mixing; piano, bowed guitar, electronic and non-conventional instruments
- Kelly Wyse - Piano on Für Alina
- Andreas Tilliander - Mastering
- Paco Barba — Artwork design
- Nicola Colonna — Photography
