= Lusine =

American musician and composer

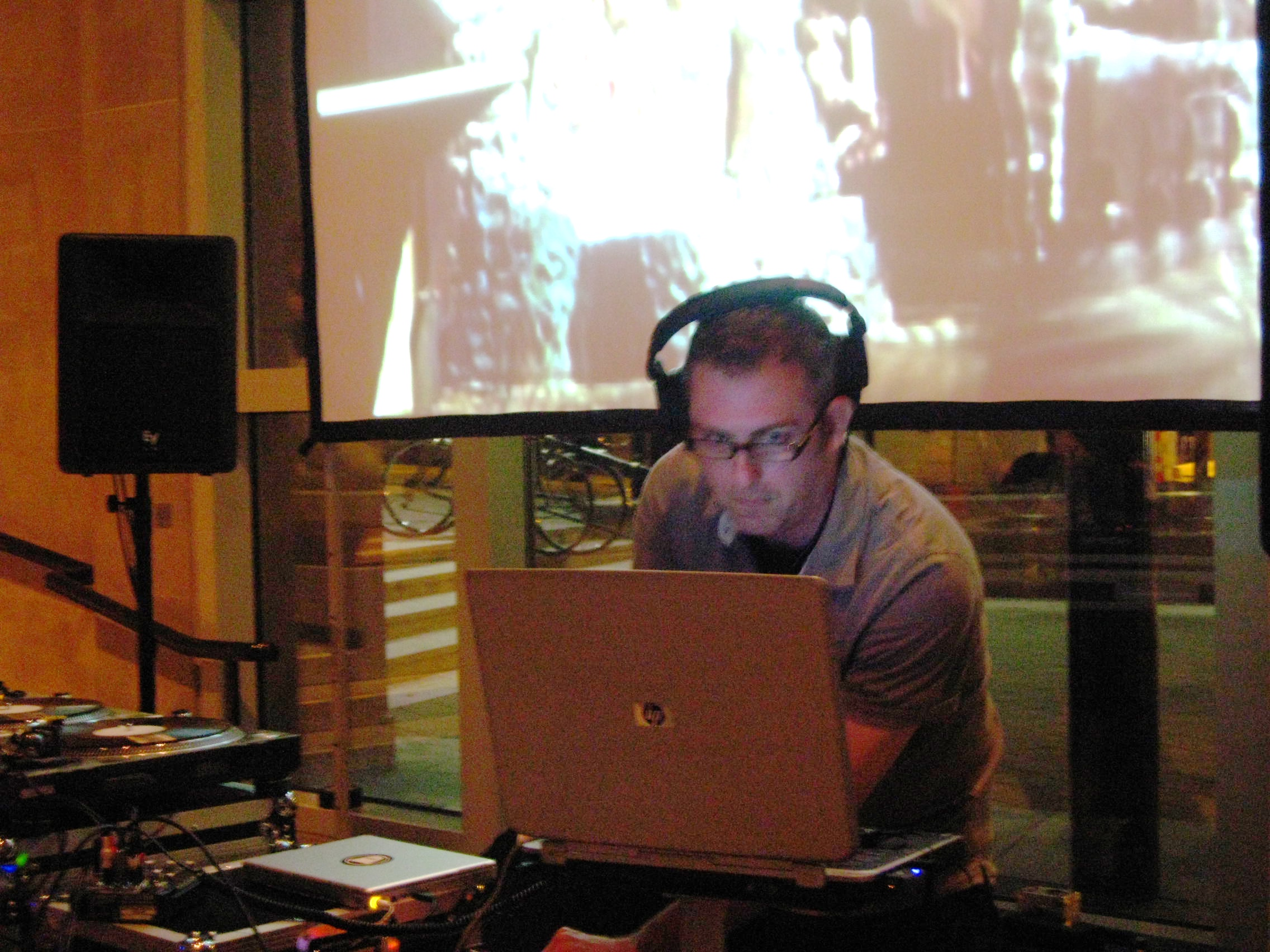
- Lusine in 2009 at Decibel Festival, Seattle

Background information
- Also known as: Lusine ICL; L'Usine
- Born: Jeff McIlwain; 1975 (age 50–51); Dallas, Texas, United States
- Occupations: Producer, composer, sound designer
- Years active: 1999–present
- Label: Ghostly International
- Website: lusineweb.com

Jeff McIlwain (born 1975), known professionally as Lusine (formerly L'Usine and Lusine ICL), is an American musician, composer and producer, known for his experimental electronic ambient and techno music.

McIlwain debuted with his album L'usine in 1999 through Isophlux Records. He followed with A Pseudo Steady State in 2000 with Hymen Records under the name Lusine ICL. In 2003 he released the EP Push as Lusine, after moving to Seattle in 2002 and signing with Ghostly International. Since his first release, McIlwain has released 10 full-length albums including A Certain Distance and Sensorimotor, as well as numerous EPs, singles, and remixes, spanning over 20 years.

In addition to recording and performing, McIlwain also composes music for films. He co-wrote soundtracks for Snow Angels (2007), The Sitter (2011), and State Like Sleep (2018), and wrote the score for Linewatch (2008).

== Early and personal life ==
Jeff McIlwain was born in 1975 in Dallas, Texas, where he spent his childhood. In 1998, he attended the California Institute of Arts, and studied electronic music and sound design for music and film. During this time, he was introduced to music sequencers and electronic sequencers through his friends, after expressing an interest in techno and electronic genres.

In 2002, McIlwain moved to Seattle, where he is based; much of his career has been based there since signing with Ghostly International.

== Career ==
=== 1999–2003: Early career ===
McIlwain first performed as L'usine in 1999, releasing his debut album of the same name with Isophlux Records. He also released Coded EP that same year. In 2000, he released A Pseudo Steady State with the independent label U-Cover, publishing under the name Lusine ICL (where "ICL" reportedly means "intercontinental" for international releases).

In 2002 and 2003, McIlwain released Iron City and Condensed, respectively. He also released several EPs and singles under various labels including Hymen Records and Mad Monkey.

McIlwain joined Ghostly International in 2003 and simplified his stage name to Lusine, before releasing Push EP.

=== 2004–2012: Serial Hodgepodge and A Certain Distance ===
In 2004, McIlwain released Serial Hodgepodge and followed with Podgelism in 2007. The former was his first major release with Ghostly International and was described as his "most accomplished work so far". Around 2005, McIlwain was working as a studio engineer in Seattle, where he met Vilja Larjosto, who provided vocals for tracks that appeared on Emerald EP.

In 2007, McIlwain released Language Barrier with Hymen Records under his previous moniker Lusine ICL; to date, it is the last time he has used this name for a major work and the final release with the label. The album is characterised by abstract sound design work using samples. That same year, McIlwain worked with David Wingo on his first major film score collaboration for Snow Angels (2007), a film by David Gordon Green. In 2008, McIlwain wrote the score for Linewatch directed by Kevin Bray.

In 2009, McIlwain followed with A Certain Distance, which uses vocal samples and was described as "experimental electronica" with "pop melodies". The album was received positively by ambient music reviewers.

=== 2013–2022: The Waiting Room and Sensorimotor ===
In the 2010s, McIlwain had less frequent and fewer releases; he took a three year period without releasing new tracks, before returning in 2013 with the full album The Waiting Room. The album included vocals from previous collaborator Caitlin Sherman. The album was described as "more conventional" and "warm" compared to previous works. The following year, McIlwain released Arterial, a four-track EP released on a limited-edition 10" vinyl record.

In 2017, McIlwain released Sensorimotor, his second album and his last major release in the 2010s. The album received positive reviews, described as an "art record" and an "evolutionary step" in McIlwain's artistic progression. The album featured several vocal collaborations, including a return by Larjosto, and artists including Benoit Pioulard, Sarah Jaffe, and Asya Saavedra. That same year, McIlwain shared on his website that he had composed the score for the "Smuggler's Run" content update trailer for Grand Theft Auto Online.

In 2019, McIlwain released Retrace, a four-track EP featuring collaborations with Jenn Champion (on the opening track "Not Alone") and CIFIKA. A music video for "Not Alone" was also released, directed by Michael Reisinger, depicting a woman using virtual reality and experiencing reality distortion among cult-like figures.

=== 2023–present: Long Light and Melting Days ===
In late 2023, McIlwain released Long Light, his first major release since Sensorimotor. Reviewers described it as a mix of ambient, pop, and IDM, and noted the return of Larjosto as a long-time collaborator.

In July 2026, McIlwain released the single "Bird's Eye" in anticipation of his next album, Melting Days. The full album was released in August that same year. It is considered his 10th full album, and draws from themes of grief, memory, and transition. The textural, ambient forms drew comparison to 2007's Language Barrier in terms of its inspiration from film score design, and a return to elements of his earlier works. To complement the release, A Certain Distance and Sensorimotor were also re-released on limited edition vinyl in celebration.

== Artistry ==
McIlwain uses field recordings and digital manipulation to create sounds. His music and sound design work draws from numerous electronic genres and techniques, described as having "melodic structure with textural refinement" and "meticulous production".

Throughout his career as Lusine, McIlwain's work has been compared to genres such as ambient, techno, avant-pop, minimal house, abstract hip-hop, glitch, and IDM, among others. His early period is characterised by cinematic ambient and experimental electronica, with a shift to vocal sampling, pop melodies, and dance production becoming a more prominent feature of his work in the early 2010s. The atmospheric "film score style" of his sound design became a focus again in the 2020s, although his experimental electronic elements and more abstract sound design work has featured heavily throughout his career, including in his EPs of the late 2010s.

== Discography ==
=== Albums ===
- L'usine – L'usine (1999; Isophlux)
- Lusine ICL – A Pseudo Steady State (2000; U-Cover)
- Lusine ICL – Coalition 2000 (2001 live; U-Cover)
- Lusine ICL – Iron City (2002; Mad Monkey/Hymen)
- Lusine ICL – Condensed (2003 anthology; Hymen)
- Lusine – Serial Hodgepodge (2004; Ghostly International)
- Lusine – Podgelism (2007; Ghostly International)
- Lusine – Podgelism Select Remixes (12") (2007; Ghostly International)
- Lusine ICL – Language Barrier (2007; Hymen)
- Lusine – A Certain Distance (2009; Ghostly International)
- Lusine – The Waiting Room (2013; Ghostly International)
- Lusine – Sensorimotor (2017; Ghostly International)
- Lusine – Long Light (2023; Ghostly International)
- Lusine – Melting Days (2026; Ghostly International)

=== EPs and singles ===
- L'usine – Coded (1999; Isophlux)
- Lusine ICL – Freak (2000; Hymen)
- Lusine ICL – Zealectronic Blue (2000 7"; Zealectronic)
- Lusine ICL – Slipthrough (2001; Hymen)
- L'usine – Surface (2001; Isophlux)
- Lusine ICL – Sustain (2002; Delikatessen)
- Lusine ICL – Chao (2002; Mental.Ind.Records)
- Lusine – Push (2003; Ghostly International)
- Lusine – Flat Remixes (2004; Ghostly International)
- Lusine – Inside/Out (2005; Ghostly International)
- Lusine ICL – Travel Sickness (2006; Hymen)
- Lusine – Emerald (2006; Ghostly International)
- Lusine – Two Dots (2009; Ghostly International)
- Lusine – Twilight (2010; Ghostly International)
- Lusine – Lucky (2013; Ghostly International)
- Lusine – Another Tomorrow (2013; Ghostly International)
- Lusine – Arterial (2014; Ghostly International)
- Lusine – Retrace (2019; Ghostly International)
- Lusine – Transonic (2023; Ghostly International)
- Lusine – Earth to Moon (2024; Ghostly International)

=== Compilation albums ===
- Various Artists – Refurbished Robots: KVRX Local Live Vol. 4 (1999; KVRX CD info)
- Lusine – Lucky Numbers: The Ghostly International EPs (2010; Ghostly International)

=== Video ===
- VICE video premier of "Just A Cloud".
- Stereogum video premier of "Not Alone" (feat. Jenn Champion).
- Lusine live on KEXP in Seattle with drummer, Trent Moorman.

=== Composition for film ===
Year	Title	Director	Notes
2007	Snow Angels	David Gordon Green	Co-composed with David Wingo
2008	Linewatch	Kevin Bray	
2011	The Sitter	David Gordon Green	Co-composed with David Wingo
2013	Joe	David Gordon Green	Co-composed with David Wingo
2018	State Like Sleep	Meredith Danluck	Co-composed with David Wingo

== See also ==
- List of ambient music artists
