= Orcas, Washington =

Orcas, Washington may refer to:

- Orcas Island, San Juan Islands, Washington, U.S.
- Orcas Village, Washington, a community on Orcas island, Washington, U.S.

== See also ==
- Orcas (disambiguation)
