= Yuzhno-Russkoye field =

Russian West Siberian petroleum field

- Location within Russia
- Country: Russia
- Region: Krasnoselkupsky District, Yamalo-Nenets Autonomous Okrug, Tyumen Oblast
- Offshore/onshore: onshore
- Coordinates: 65°56′16″N 80°15′22″E
- Operator: Severneftegazprom
- Partners: Gazprom; Wintershall Dea; Unipro

Field history
- Discovery: 1969
- Start of production: 2007

Production
- Estimated oil in place: 5.7 million tonnes (~ 6.6×10^{6} m^{3} or 42 million bbl)
- Estimated gas in place: 805.3×10^{9} m^{3} (28.44×10^{12} cu ft)

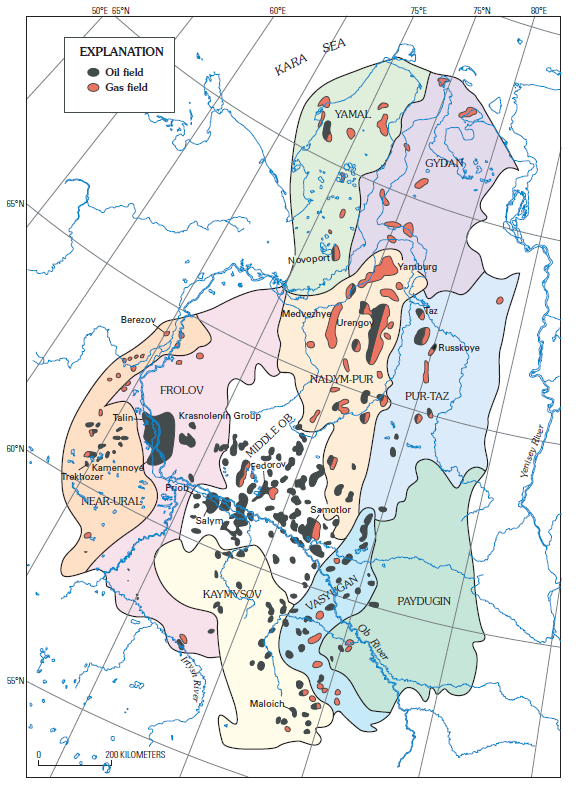
West Siberian petroleum basin oil and gas fields

The Yuzhno-Russkoye field is a Russian oil and gas field located in the Krasnoselkupsky District, Yamal-Nenets Autonomous Okrug, Tyumen Oblast.

== History ==
The Yuzhno-Russkoye field was discovered in 1969. Preparation for the development of the field started in 1997. American oil company Moncrief Oil International claims that in 1997, Gazprom's subsidiary Zapsibgazprom and Moncrief signed a contract according to which Moncrief acquired 40% of stake in the field, a claim that Gazprom does not recognize. According to the contract Severneftegazprom was established as operating company. In the following years control over Severneftegazprom was gained by Itera and later regained by Gazprom. In 2004, Gazprom started negotiations with BASF and E.ON over development the Yuzhno-Russkoye field. The inauguration ceremony launching work on the field was held on 18 December 2007.

== Technical features ==
The gas field lies about one kilometer below the surface. The proven gas reserves of Yuzhno-Russkoye are 805.3 bcm (billion cubic meters) and estimated reserves are more than 1000 bcm of natural gas. The proven oil reserves are 5.7 million tons. The planned capacity of Yuzhno-Russkoye field is about 25 bcm of gas per year. Currently there are 26 gas wells in operation producing 15 million cubic meters of natural gas per day. It is designated to become the main natural gas supply for the Nord Stream 1 pipeline.

== Operating company ==
The licence for the Yuzhno-Russkoye field is owned by Severneftegazprom, the subsidiary of Russian gas company Gazprom. German energy company Wintershall Dea, a subsidiary of BASF, owns 35% minus one share (25% of voting shares minus one share) in Severneftegazprom. German company Uniper (previously E.ON) holds also 25% share of Severneftegazprom minus one share.

== See also ==
- Petroleum industry in Russia
