= The North Bend =

Studio album by Rafael Anton Irisarri
- Released: August 31, 2010
- Recorded: Seattle, Washington
- Genre: Ambient, minimalism
- Length: Approximately 41 minutes
- Label: ROOM40

Rafael Anton Irisarri chronology
Reverie (EP) (2010)	The North Bend (2010)

Professional ratings
Review scores
Source	Rating
Groovemine	
Textura	link
Cyclic Defrost	not rated link

The North Bend is the second full-length album by Rafael Anton Irisarri, released by Australian label ROOM40. It was originally released worldwide as physical (CD & LTD Vinyl) and digital album on August 31, 2010. The album has received universal praise by the press and music community, being the "Album of the Week" at Boomkat.com.

The North Bend tips its hat to the rugged terrain of the American Pacific Northwest. Hinting at connections to David Lynch’s television-narrative redefining Twin Peaks, and contributing a new form to those traditions (that of neoclassical, spectral and ambient sublimity amongst other representations of the vast natural surroundings of the Cascadia region).

According to Irisarri (in an interview with Australian ABC radio), “The record is inspired by this region (American Pacific Northwest), and not just with the fairly obvious ‘rainy, gloomy skies’ clichés, but more in the folk, cultural traditions and pop-culture references (think of David Lynch and his television-defining narrative Twin Peaks). They sort of helped me create an audio postcard of this beautiful area of the United States.”

== Track listing ==
All tracks written, arranged, and produced by Rafael Anton Irisarri

1. "Passage"
2. "Blue Tomorrows"
3. "A Great Northern Sigh"
4. "Traces"
5. "Deception Falls"

== Personnel ==
- Rafael Anton Irisarri — Production, mixing; Guitar, Samples, Piano
- Lawrence English — Mastering
- Jefferson Petrey — Liner Notes
- Phil Petrocelli — Artwork design
