= Précis (album) =

Studio album by Benoît Pioulard
- Released: October 16, 2006
- Recorded: 2005–2006
- Genre: Electronic; Ambient; Folk; Shoegazing
- Length: 37:02
- Label: Kranky

Benoît Pioulard chronology
Dakota / Housecoat (2006)	Précis (2006)	Temper (2008)

Professional ratings
Review scores
Source	Rating
Almost Cool	link
Allmusic	link
Cokemachineglow	75% link
LAS Magazine	link
Pitchfork Media	6.0/10 link
Stylus Magazine	A link

Précis is the debut full-length album by Portland, Oregon based musician Benoît Pioulard, released by Kranky on October 16, 2006.

== Background ==
Before the release of this album, Pioulard already had a fairly substantial discography. This included many self-released albums on CD-R and cassette, as well as the 7-inch EP Enge, which was put out by Moodgadget in 2005. He later signed a deal with Chicago label Kranky, from which this album was released.

=== Handmade version ===
An elaborate handmade version of this album was released through his Myspace profile in September 2006.

Limited to only 25 copies, this edition had exclusive content not available on the standard release and due to high demand sold out rapidly.

== Critical reception ==
Précis was generally very well received by critics. Stylus Magazine was one of the first publications to review the album, remarking:

Précis is a spectacular, fully realized debut...a breathtaking sonic landscape that sounds like nothing else you’ll hear this year. Rating: A

AllMusic, who named Pioulard a "Hot Artist" in December 2006, were also impressed with the album, saying:

Précis is a remarkably concise album -- over the course of 37 minutes, Pioulard covers an impressive range of sounds and feelings. More importantly, though, it's also a remarkably accomplished debut: hazy without disappearing into the background, immediately captivating but still full of things to discover on later listens.

== Track listing ==
1. "La Guerre de Sept Ans" – 3:08
2. "Together & Down" – 3:07
3. "Ext. Leslie Park" – 2:42
4. "Triggering Back" – 2:30
5. "Moth Wings" – 1:16
6. "Alan & Dawn" – 2:50
7. "Corpus Chant" – 1:43
8. "Palimend" – 3:04
9. "Coup de Foudre" – 1:31
10. "Hirondelle" – 2:22
11. "Needle & Thread" – 2:42
12. "R Coloring" – 0:39
13. "Sous la Plage" – 2:59
14. "Patter" – 2:58
15. "Ash into the Sky" – 3:18

== Music videos ==
On December 6, 2006, a video for Triggering Back was released. It was directed by Adam Hunt and was posted on both Pioulard's Myspace profile and his official website.

Themes in the video generally revolve around photography and nature. It shows Pioulard travelling around various locations and taking Polaroid photographs of his surroundings, which then fall to the ground. Featuring a mixture of close-up shots and distant views, it is a hazy, almost dreamlike video that seems to fit with the style of the song and its ephemeric lyrical focus.

View the video in QuickTime format here
