= Orca (company) =

Wetsuit and sports apparel company

- Type: Private
- Industry: Sports Apparel
- Founded: 1995
- Headquarters: Auckland, New Zealand
- Key people: Scott Unsworth, Founder, CEO
- Products: Wetsuits, Triathlon apparel, Cycling gear, General sports apparel
- Number of employees: 25 staff
- Website: orca.com

Orca is a New Zealand company that makes wetsuits and sports apparel, primarily for triathletes.

== History ==
The company was founded in Auckland in 1995 by Scott Unsworth, a former New Zealand age group triathlon champion. He decided to start manufacturing wetsuits after discovering that traditional wetsuits were not suitable for swimming. In Auckland Unsworth founded a company called Performance Speedsuits Ltd., that manufactured swimming-friendly speed suits, and these speed suits gained much popularity. It was eventually renamed "Orca".

In 2004, Orca was the official apparel supplier to the New Zealand Olympic team. In 2008, the company agreed a global distribution deal with Spanish cycling giant Orbea.
