= Opinion Research Center of Afghanistan =

Afghani research organization

Opinion Research Center of Afghanistan (ORCA) is a social science research organization based in Kabul, Afghanistan. It operates in the areas of opinion, market and media research. It was founded in 2008, and claims to be "the largest full-service Afghan research center operating in the areas of market, media and opinion research." ORCA is Afghan-owned, and its survey enumerators are locally recruited.
