= DEA AG =

Germany-based oil and gas company

DEA Deutsche Erdoel AG
- Type: AG
- Industry: Oil and gas
- Predecessor: Deutsche Erdöl-Aktiengesellschaft (DEA)
- Founded: 1899
- Defunct: May 2019
- Fate: Merged with Wintershall to form Wintershall Dea
- Successor: Wintershall Dea
- Headquarters: Hamburg, Germany
- Number of locations: 12
- Revenue: €1.5 billion (2016)
- Number of employees: 1,150 (2016)
- Parent: L1 Energy

DEA Deutsche Erdoel AG was an international oil and gas company headquartered in Hamburg, Germany. It was a subsidiary of L1 Energy. In 2018, DEA owned stakes in oil and gas licenses in various countries and operated natural gas underground storage facilities in Germany. DEA is a derivation from Deutsche Erdöl-Aktiengesellschaft, the original name of the company. On 1 May 2019, DEA merged with Wintershall to form Wintershall Dea.

== History ==
=== The early years ===
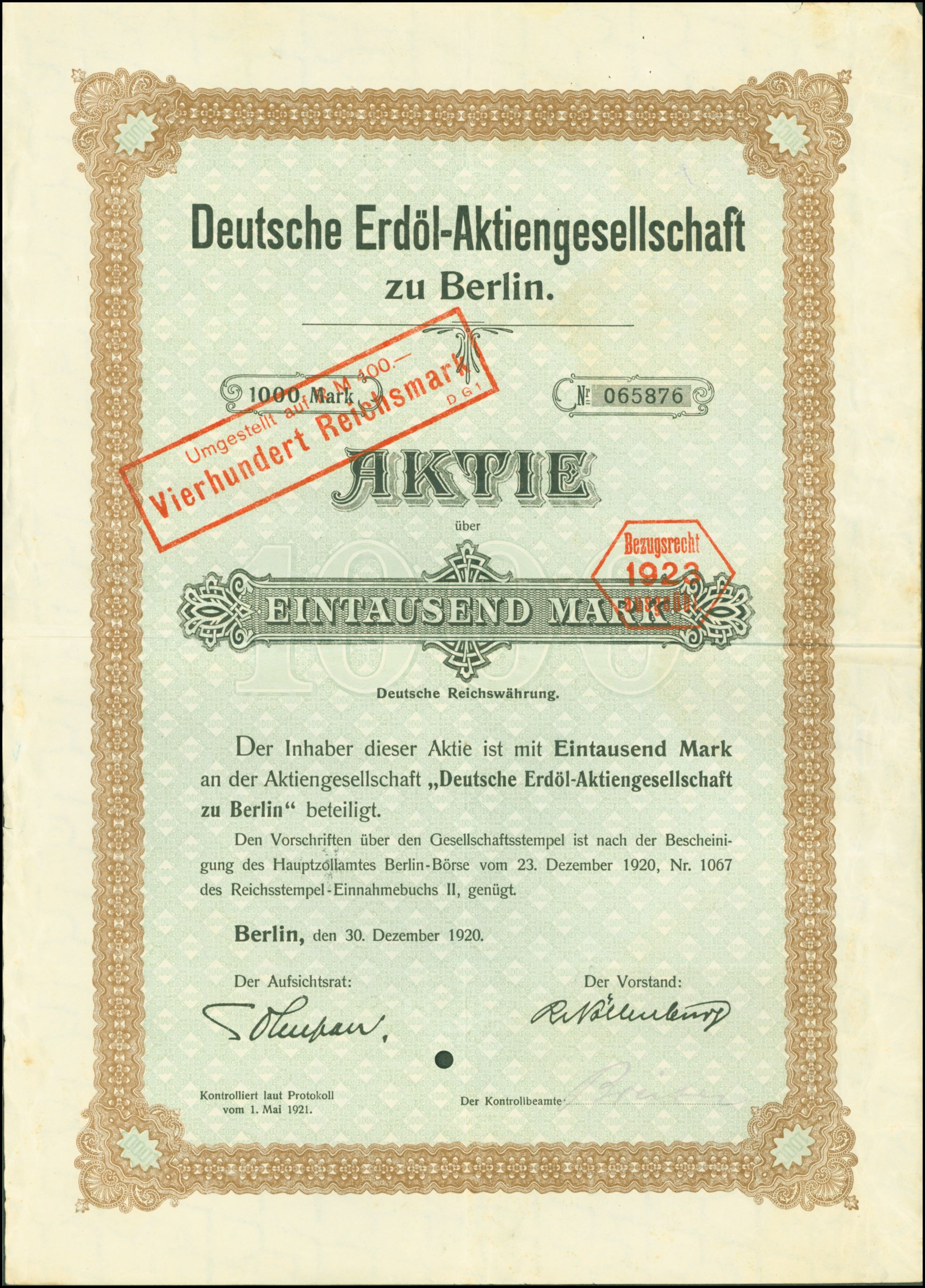
Share of the Deutsche Erdoel-AG, issued 30. December 1920

Deutsche Tiefbohr-Actiengesellschaft was founded in Berlin on 10 January 1899. In 1900 the headquarter was relocated to Nordhausen. The new company specialised in all types of mineral oil product and, among other things, raw lignite, briquettes for domestic heating and industry, lignite tar and paraffin. Its managing director was the Krefeld businessman Rudolf Nöllenburg.

It first struck oil with a well of its own in 1901, in 1906 crude oil is officially declared the new main business. Since 1907 the companies headquarters were again moved to Berlin. In 1911, DTA and its subsidiary Vereinigte Norddeutsche Mineralölwerke AG were merged with Deutsche Mineralölindustrie AG to create Deutsche Erdoel-Actiengesellschaft (DEA), based in Berlin.

DEA had stakes in oil fields in Alsace, Austria-Hungary and Romania from 1905/1906, but lost most of its foreign production when the World War I broke out. However, DEA drilled the world's first oil shaft – in Pechelbronn in Alsace – in 1917. Unlike extraction close to the surface or by means of wells, this involved the first-ever application of the complex shaft construction method, in which oil is “mined”. However, domestic oil production was not able to secure the company's survival and so DEA focused on coal mining until the early 1930s.

=== The Third Reich ===
DEA benefited from the seizure of power by the National Socialists, such as in the form of loans under the Reich Drilling Programme from 1934 onwards. Greater self-sufficiency in German's supply of raw materials had been an official goal of the National Socialist state since Adolf Hitler's Four-Year Plan Memorandum in 1936. The company began production operations in Czechoslovakia and in Alsace by participating in consortia such as Kontinentale Öl AG, which was founded in 1941. In 1937/1938, Jewish members were excluded from the management board and supervisory board. DEA also employed forced labourers on a large scale. The precise ties between company management and the NS regime have not yet been investigated.

At the time, the company's business activities covered a large part of the production and supply chain: extraction, processing and utilisation of mineral oil products and their resale, acquisition of and trading in mining rights, and the manufacture of mining machinery and equipment.

In 1943, its subsidiaries and equity interests included Deutscher Mineralöl-Verkaufsverein GmbH in Berlin, Deutsche Viscobil Oel GmbH in Berlin and Braunkohle-Benzin AG (BRABAG) in Berlin.

Its hard coal operations in 1938 comprised the Graf Bismarck Colliery in Gelsenkirchen and the Königsgrube Colliery in Wanne-Eickel. Lignite operations were grouped at the Borna branch in the administrative district of Leipzig and consisted of various lignite works, briquette factories, an earthenware factory and a brick factory in the region.

=== Post-war era ===
The company was relocated to Hamburg in 1948. NITAG's headquarters at Mittelweg in the Hamburg district of Rotherbaum were closed as a result of the merger between Gasolin and Wintershall's subsidiary NITAG. DEA then moved into them. Its headquarters were then moved to Hamburg City Nord around 1970.

DEA developed various new fields in Germany as part of expansion of domestic oil production in the 1950s. In 1956, Wintershall and DEA contributed Deutsche Gasolin to Aral. However, DEA left the Aral Group in 1960 in order to build its own service station network.

In 1963 an employee of DEA, Rudolf Dittrich, and his team in Wieze were instrumental in rescuing 14 miners who were trapped for many days in a collapsed coal mine in Lengede, Lower Saxony. They did so, together with others, by applying very innovative drilling techniques. The successful effort is commonly known in German history as the “Miracle of Lengede” (Wunder von Lengede). By 1965, the DEA Group was generating revenue of DM 2.01 billion and had 26,400 employees. Texaco took over more than 90% of the shares in DEA in 1966. DEA became Deutsche Texaco AG in 1970. The mines it owned were contributed to Ruhrkohle AG (RAG) around 1970.

=== Acquisition, restructuring and sale by RWE ===
The takeover of Deutsche Texaco by RWE AG in 1988 created RWE-DEA Aktiengesellschaft für Mineraloel und Chemie. From then on, the company's service stations once more bore the name “DEA”. After German reunification, the service station network was expanded to Eastern Germany.

The chemicals division Condea was sold to the South African company Sasol in 2001. The joint venture Fuchs Dea Schmierstoffe GmbH & Co. KG between the partners Fuchs Petrolub AG and DEA Mineraloel AG was terminated effective 31 December 2001. In 2002, the company's downstream business (refineries, logistics, service stations) was integrated into a joint venture with Shell named Shell & DEA Oil GmbH, which was taken over fully by Shell effective 1 July 2002. Since mid-2002, RWE-Dea has focused on upstream business. From 2004, most of the DEA service stations were reflagged to “Shell”, while some were sold. The last DEA service station in Germany was located in Haltern; Shell AG continued running it so that it could secure the rights to the “DEA” trademark permanently. The service station was closed in 2017 and replaced by an old Shell service station with the DEA branding in Lichtenfels.

In March 2013, RWE announced its intention to sell DEA and use the proceeds to pay some of its €33 billion in debt. RWE received at least three bids in an auction up to the beginning of 2014. One of them came from L1 Energy, a subsidiary of the LetterOne Group. The LetterOne Group is an investment company that is headquartered in Luxembourg and whose main owner (indirectly through the Alfa Group) is the Russian business magnate Mikhail Fridman. RWE reported on 16 March 2014 that it had in principle agreed with LetterOne to sell DEA. RWE Dea was valued at €5.1 billion as part of the deal.

RWE announced on 30 March 2014 that the agreement with the LetterOne Group had been signed. In June, the German Federal Minister for Economic Affairs, Sigmar Gabriel, ordered an examination of the sale, which lasted for two months. The takeover was finally approved by the German government on 22 August 2014. In October 2014, the Financial Times reported that the British Secretary of State for Energy Edward Davey would not agree to the sale in view of the tighter sanctions imposed on Russia. The multi-billion transaction was finally closed, despite the misgivings of the British government, at the start of the first week in March 2015.

== Merger with Wintershall Holding GmbH ==
A binding agreement to merge DEA and Wintershall was published on 27 September 2018. The merger was carried out with official approval in May 2019. It created Europe's leading independent gas and oil company. BASF holds 67% of Wintershall Dea and LetterOne holds 33% of the ordinary shares in Wintershall Dea. To consider the value of the midstream business of Wintershall Dea, BASF further received preference shares which results in a current overall participation of BASF of 72.7% in the entire share capital of the company. The preference shares will convert into ordinary shares of the Company on May 1, 2022, or upon an initial public offering, whichever comes earlier.

== Literature ==
- Rainer Karlsch, Raymond G. Stokes: Faktor Öl. Die Mineralölwirtschaft in Deutschland 1859-1974. (“The Factor Oil: The Mineral Oil industry in Germany from 1859 to 1974 (German Only)) C. H. Beck, Munich 2003, ISBN 978-3-406-50276-7.
- James, H.; Müller, M.L.; Historische Gesellschaft der Deutschen Bank e.V.: "Georg Solmssen - ein deutscher Bankier: Briefe aus einem halben Jahrhundert 1900-1956" (Georg Solmssen - a german banker: letters from half of a century 1900–1956), C.H.Beck, 31 May 2012.
- Weber, F.: "Warum hat sich in Deutschland kein integrierter nationaler Mineralölkonzern herausgebildet?" (Why did no national oil company evolve in Germany?), diplom.de, 20 Jul 2004.
- Ferrier, R. W.; Fursenko, A.: Oil In The World Economy, Routledge, 2 Mar 2016.
