= Gasolin AG =

German oil company

Gasolin AG was a German oil company from 1920 to 1971 (trading under this name from 1926); it ran its own chain of petrol stations.

== History and shareholdings ==
=== Early years and expansion ===
==== Origin ====
Gasolin was founded on 23 March 1920 as Olea Mineralölwerke AG in Frankfurt, taking over the Deutsche Schmiermittel GmbH (German lubricant company). The purpose of the company was "acquisition, construction and operation of plants and enterprises aimed at the extraction, production, processing, recycling, storage, transport and trade of fuels of all kinds, lubricants, technical oils and greases, petroleum, tar and their reprocessing products, bitumen and related substances and other chemical products". From 1922 it operated under the name Oleawerke AG für Mineralöl-Industrie based in Frankfurt (Main), from December 1923 based in Berlin. By this time, it had already taken over Süddeutsche Oel- und Melanolwerke GmbH, based in Freiburg im Breisgau.

==== The Stinnes era ====
In June 1923, Hugo Stinnes took over A. Riebeck'sche Montanwerke AG, which mainly owned mines and shares in mines in the Halle (Saale) area and Weißenfels-Zeitz; it also owned oil concessions in Argentina as well as mineral oil, paraffin, candle and montan wax factories. From them, he formed the Hugo Stinnes-Riebeck Montan- and Oelwerke AG, in which he bundled his oil interests. In 1923/1924 he acquired Oleawerke, which had refineries in Frankfurt (Main) and Freiburg, which took over the distribution of the entire brown-coal (lignite) production of A. Reibeck'sche Montanwerke, as well as the petrol refinery at Dollbergen, and the AG für Petroleumindustrie (Api) in Berlin. In addition, he acquired the majority of mining rights for the Concordia mine near Nachterstedt and the Messel mine near Darmstadt, in order to strengthen his oil interests.

==== BASF ====
After the untimely death of Hugo Stinnes in 1924, his heirs were unable to form a viable company, so the conglomerate was divided up the following year. BASF took over the oil business. In April 1925, Oleawerke and the incorporated oil works with their refinery in Dollbergen were spun off into a subsidiary and renamed Hugo Stinnes-Riebeck Oel-AG, based in Halle (Saale). The remaining A. Riebeck'sche Montanwerke returned to its original name in September of the same year. In the 1920s, BASF wanted to secure the German crude oil industry. Together with Royal Dutch (today Royal Dutch Shell) it had half-shares in the Internationale Bergin Compagnie voor Olie en Kolen Chemie, founded in 1921 for the purpose of international use of the German-patented method for hydrogenation of coal. In 1925/1926 BASF and Standard Oil of New Jersey (today ExxonMobil) decided to cooperate in the production of synthetic petrol from brown-coal (lignite), and to build up Hugo Stinnes-Riebeck Oel-AG as their sales company in Germany; both would participate in it directly.

==== IG Farben ====
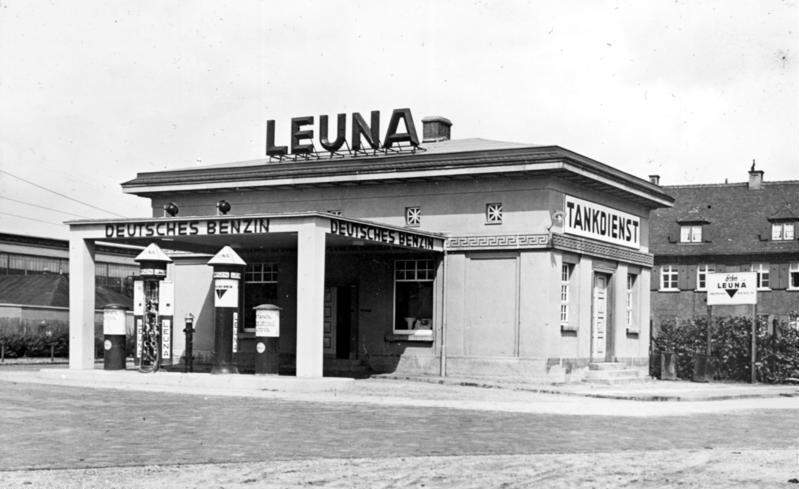
A Leuna petrol-station in 1936

On 4 May 1926, Hugo Stinnes-Riebeck Oel-AG was renamed Deutsche Gasolin Aktiengesellschaft (D.G.A.), registered in Berlin-Charlottenburg. The shareholders were I.G. Farben, A. Riebeck'sche Montanwerke AG, Royal Dutch, and Standard Oil of New Jersey, with 25% shares each. In the divisional structure of IG Farben, Gasolin appeared alongside the IG Oils division, together with the Nitrogen syndicate, and the sales divisions for Chemicals, Pharmaceuticals, Photo and artificial silk, and the colours/dyestuffs (Farben) division. It was mainly intended to sell synthetic Leuna gasoline through its pumps. To this end, the expansion of the petrol station chain was prioritised. Until production facilities for synthetic gasoline were built up, Gasolin sold its petrol (mainly from Dollbergen) as 'German gasoline' in order to differentiate itself from the foreign mineral oil imports of its competitors.

In 1929, Deutsche Gasolin had a balance sheet total of RM27 million. It was thus in 5th place in the list of oil companies operating in Germany.

In 1935, the Gasolin was one of the 'Big Five' petrol station chains in Germany with 3,315 petrol pumps (5.9%) and a sales quota of 6.7%. In 1938, Gasolin had a market share of 1.4% for diesel fuel and 1.3% for lubricating oils.

==== Wartime ====
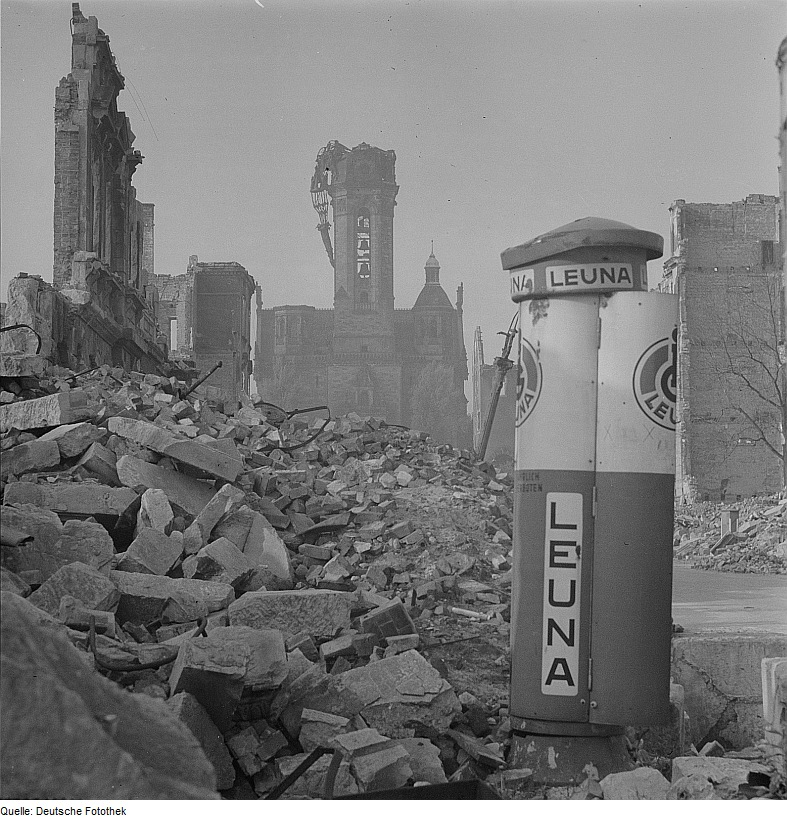
Dresden, view towards the ruins of the Lukas church, by Richard Peter, 1945

With the transition to wartime economy in September 1939 and the associated central state control by the Arbeitsgemeinschaft Mineralölverteilung (AMV, working-group for mineral oil distribution), the brand names disappeared, and the petrol stations were subsumed by the Central Office for Mineral Oil. The distribution syndicate of the AMV supplied unbranded petrol on provision of a fuel pass or purchase certificate.

In May 1940, a British bombing raid took place on a refinery of the Deutsche Gasolin in Emmerich. The refinery remained intact, but there were some deaths. Gasolin and its employees are remembered in the Emmerich tapestry, in the city council chamber, which depicts a Gasolin worker with an oil barrel.

In 1943 Gasolin had sales offices in Berlin, Breslau, Dortmund, Dresden, Frankfurt am Main, Hamburg, Hanover, Cologne, Leipzig, Munich and Stuttgart as well as in Vienna.

In the course of 1944, the refineries in Emmerich and Dollbergen were destroyed by air raids. To replace them, work began in August 1944 at Lohmen (Saxony) in connection with Dachs VII, creating an underground tunnel in the sandstone leading to two shafts in the quarry of the Alte Poste. This had possessed a siding to the Pirna railway junction since 1907. Above ground, the small distillation plants, Ovens 19-22, were immediately built, and in 1944 began to produce gasoline using crude oil from the Vienna Basin near Zistersdorf, which arrived by train in tanker wagons.

=== Post-war reorganisation ===
==== East-West division ====
From 1943, the Deutsche Reichsbank in Berlin was the only securities collection bank in Germany. Thus, at the time of the end of the war in 1945, the shares of Deutsche Gasolin AG found themselves in the Soviet sector of Berlin. Although Gasolin became an independent petrol station company in the west (registered in Berlin-Charlottenburg) with the loss of its ownership in the east due to the unbundling of I.G. Farben, the securities were "blocked" from a Western point of view. And the largest supplier of gasoline, the Leunawerke, was also in the east and was no longer available.

This blockade of the shares made a bid of securities impossible. In order to eliminate the legal uncertainty, a securities adjustment was carried out. Due to the Securities Adjustment Act of 1 October 1949, Gasolin's shares were declared invalid and replaced by a collective certificate.

At first, after the Second World War, Gasolin was run on the Eastern side, in the Soviet occupation zone, as a Staatl. A.G. Gasolin Zeitz. The petrol station business in the GDR was later continued by Minol.

==== Sale to Wintershall and DEA ====
Trademark of Gasolin, black/red Leuna font used from the early 1950s to the early 1960s, trade-marked 1954

Subsequently, the previous owners were able to prove that they remained the rightful owners of part of the company. Standard Oil of New Jersey with its German subsidiary Esso AG and Royal Dutch with its German subsidiary Deutsche Shell AG both received their respective 25% ownership of the collective deed. A further 6.557% was held by the Bank Deutscher Länder and some smaller shareholders. In 1951, the trustees of I.G. Farben offered for sale 41% of the shares, with capital value amounting to 13.2 million Deutschmarks, the current share-holding of A. Riebeck'sche Montanwerke AG, following dealing amongst the shareholders. In return for the write-off of a $2.4 million Gasolin debt from the 1930s, Esso and Shell also agreed to sell their stake in the package.

At this time, Gasolin had a market share of about 6.5% for petrol and about 3.9% for diesel. Gasolin's filling station network consisted of 504 so-called large filling stations and a further 1400 petrol and dispensing points.

Caltex together with Ruhr Oel and Mineralöl-Werke Ernst Jung on the one hand, and Wintershall and DEA on the other hand submitted offers. Although Caltex could have paid the dollar debt, the idea of a further loss of the German market to foreign investors did not appeal to the Ministry of Economic Affairs. The Caltex offer was withdrawn in May 1952, after which there remained an offer from Gulf Oil, in June. However, Wintershall and DEA prevailed as German mineral oil producers, and took over the 91% majority of shares in Deutsche Gasolin AG in July at a ratio of 65:35. They continued to run the company as a mineral oil company with its filling stations and the remaining refinery in Dollbergen (producing 120,000 metric tonnes of crude oil per year). Gasolin was mainly to sell the fuels and lubricants from the Emsland oil refinery in Lingen, which was then under construction.

==== Merger with NITAG ====
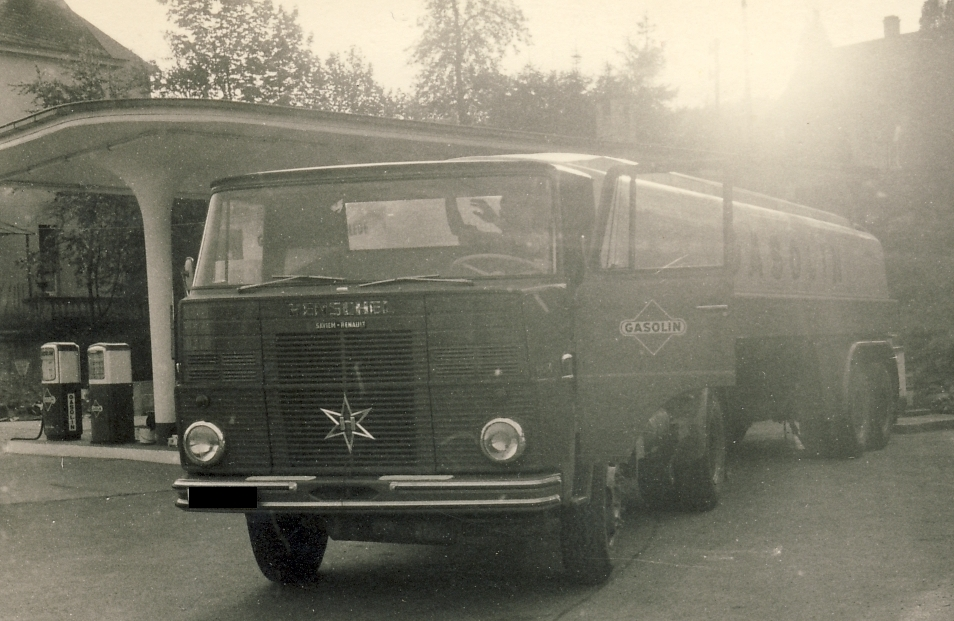
A Gasolin tanker from the early 1960's. In the background a petrol-station canopy supported by mushroom-shaped pillars

In the mid-1950s, the market share of "foreign" petrol station chains was about 40%, the share of large "German" companies about 36%; the rest was spread over a large number of small and medium-sized companies. In order to strengthen the German share of the filling station market, Wintershall and DEA became co-owners of the BV-Aral Association in 1956, contributing their sales subsidiary NITAG (Wintershall), their filling stations (DEA) and their respective shares in Gasolin.

As a result, NITAG with its approximately 800 filling stations was merged into Gasolin with about 2000 filling stations to become Deutsche Gasolin-Nitag AG. In 1956, the turnover of the new company amounted to approximately 400 million Deutschmarks with fixed assets of 45 million, current assets of 75 million and total assets of 120 million Deutschmarks.

==== From 1960 ====
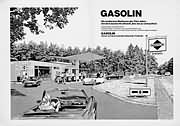
A Gasolin petrol station from the 1960's, from an ink drawing by Bruno Bergner

After taking over 50% of Rheinpreußen AG für Bergbau und Chemie (Mining and Chemicals) in 1959, DEA withdrew from BV-Aral in 1960. DEA took with it its own chain of petrol stations, and was compensated for its shares in Gasolin, which remained in BV-Aral.

In 1961, the 100% member companies in the BV-Aral association decided to market their various products (fuels and lubricants) under the common brand-name Aral. This did not apply to Gasolin, whose shares were only 91% owned by BV-Aral (Gasolin still had some small shareholders, see above).

In 1967 the name was changed to Gasolin AG. The oil refinery in Dollbergen was shut down in 1969.

The red and white Gasolin brand and the AG survived until August 1971 when they were merged with the Wintershall subsidiary Aral, which is now part of BP. The last Gasolin headquarters was at Jordanstrasse 32 in Hanover. The approximately 3,500 filling stations in West Germany were operated from here.

==== Gasolin today ====
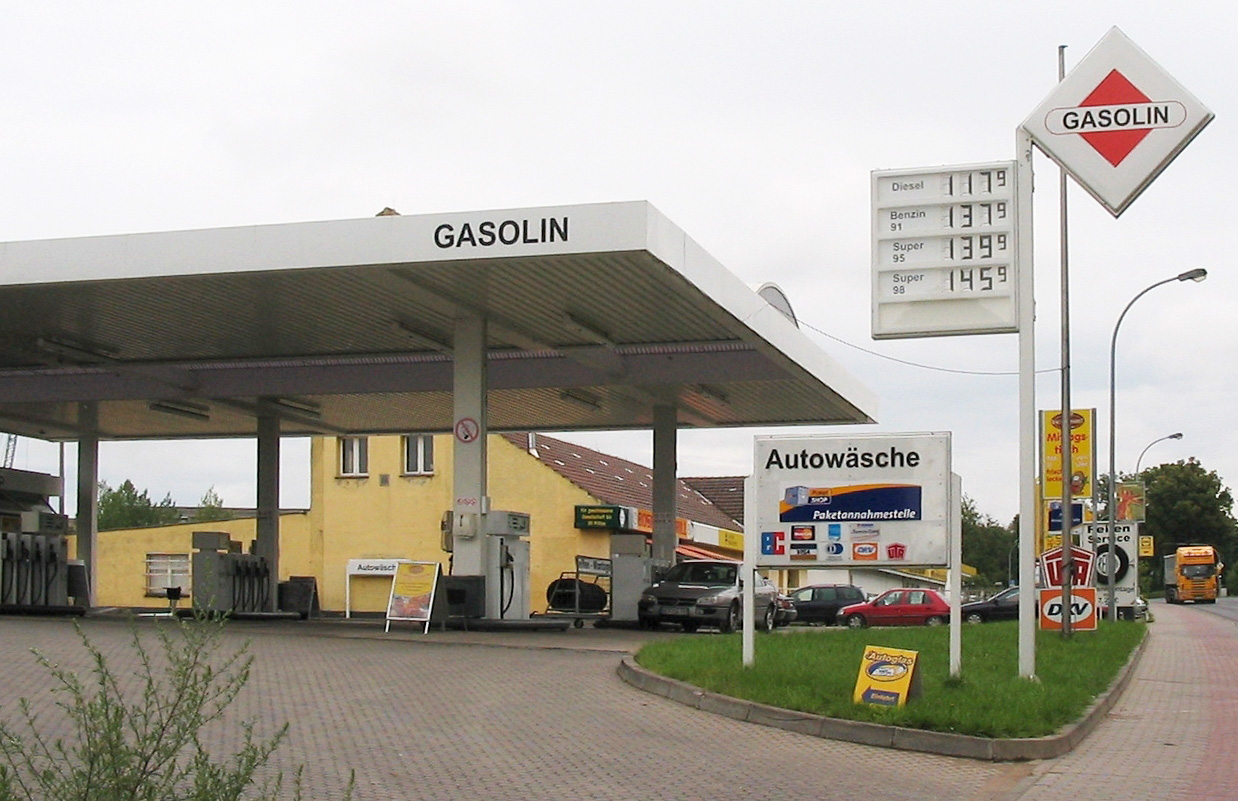
Gasolin petrol station in Pasewalk, 2007 (white-painted Aral sign with Gasolin-sign attached

Today a company Gasolin GmbH still exists, at the same address as the headquarters of Aral AG in Bochum. Up to 2006, the company submitted its own accounts to the Elektronischer Bundesanzeiger (German equivalent of the UK Companies House), but since then it has been freed of the requirement by its status as a company with small capital, run by a larger business, Deutsch BP AG.

The brand was revived after the reunification of East and West Germany, when some Aral petrol stations in East Germany were reflagged. Two of them are still operated today, in Pasewalk and Ueckermünde, by a private leaseholder under the Gasolin brand in order to protect the brand.

=== Gasolin in Austria ===
Gasolin expanded in Austria following the annexation of Austria in 1938. From 1938 to 1945, Gasolin Ges.m.b.H. in Vienna operated an oil refinery on the southern outskirts of Korneuburg. This refinery operated from 1923 to 1961, and was partially destroyed in the Second World War.

In 1945, Gasolin in Austria (in the Soviet sector) together with the refinery in Korneuburg fell to the Soviet Petroleum Administration (SMV) as "German property". In 1955, in accordance with the Austrian State Treaty (lists 3 and 4), the Soviet Union received ownership rights to Deutsche Gasolin A. G., Verteilungsstelle in Österreich, G.m.b.H., the Austrian part of Gasolin. Subsequently, Gasolin in Austria was nationalised and taken over by Austrian Mineral Oil Administration (ÖMV, today OMV), founded in 1956, the Soviet Union receiving compensation. The refinery in Korneuburg was shut down in 1961 after the construction of the new Schwechat refinery.

The property in the other three sectors was handed over directly by the Allies to Austria as the new owner, as a result of the Austrian nationalization laws in 1946. Around 1952 and 1954, the new owners published road-maps under the name Gasolin Gesellschaft m.b.H. (Salzburg). The ÖMV combined Gasolin with NITAG and the Benzene Association in the organization Martha. All of them traded under the Aral brand from 1956 until they were renamed today's OMV.

== Products and Marketing ==
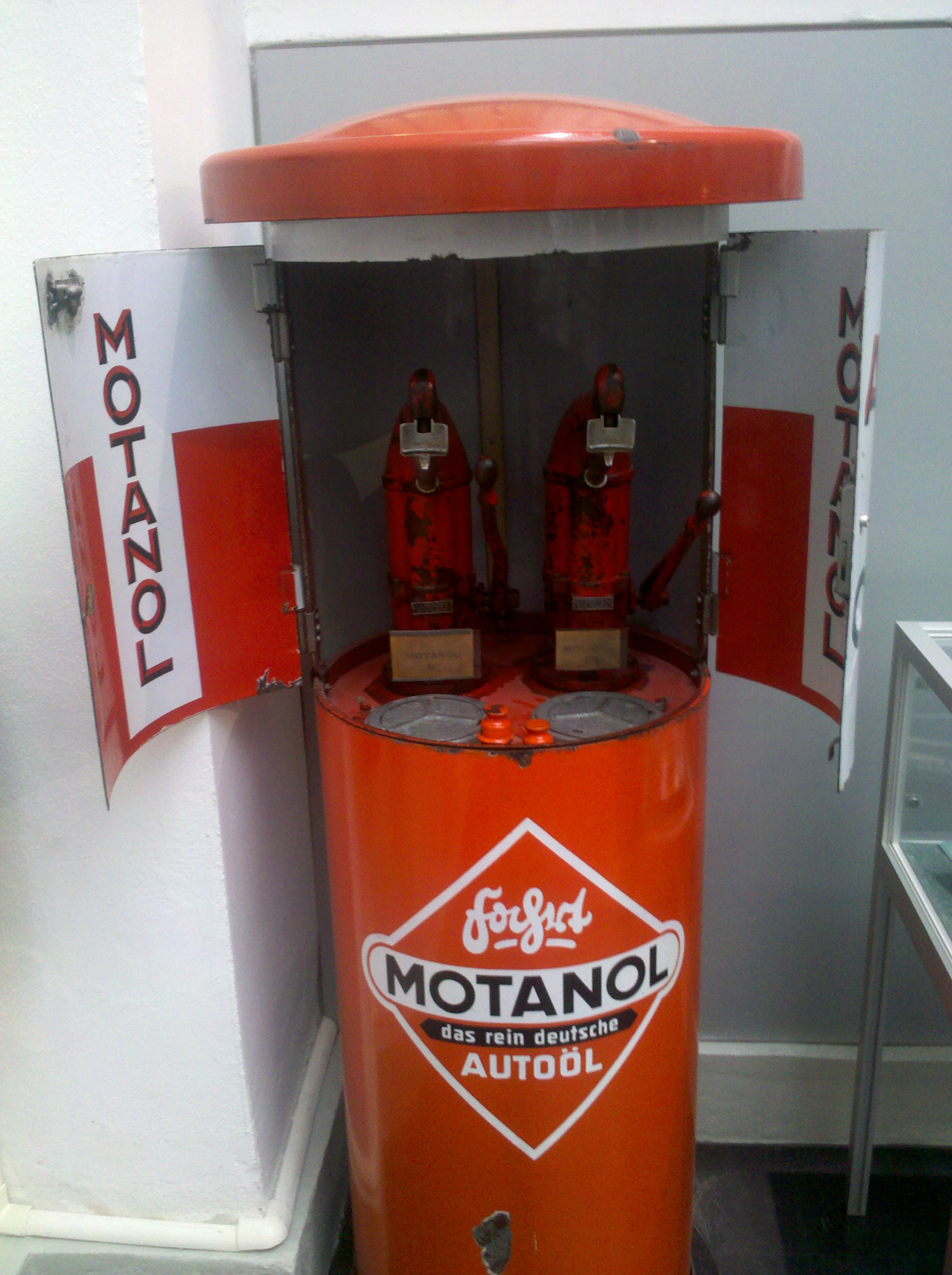
A Motanol oil-station from the 1930s

Up to 1945, Gasolin and the "I.G. Abteilung Öle" (I.G. Oils department) primarily sold synthetic Leuna petrol, but also supplied car oil, lubricating oil, asphalt, and Leuna propellant gas. In addition, Gasolin sold normal petrol from its own refineries under the name Gasolin, and knock-resistant petrol with the additive iron pentacarbonyl under the name Motalin. A petrol-benzene mixture was sold as Motorin, and a starting agent for the engine on cold days was called Supralin.

In 1927, in response to accusations of defacing the environment, Gasolin commissioned the architect and designer Peter Behrens to design petrol pumps and petrol stations. At the same time, the architect Hans Poelzig designed pre-assembled, prefabricated Leuna filling stations.

In the 1930s, advertisement was mostly for Leuna petrol. The logo appeared frequently on road-maps, consisting of an open red and white fuel pump. For the 1936 Summer Olympics, the Motanol rhombus symbol, advertising Motanol engine oil was added at the bottom right. This was a red rhombus with a white bar superimposed, carrying the product name in black. In the 1950s, a Gasolin version of this diamond symbol became a registered company trademark.

After 1945, Gasolin had its petrol Benzin and its benzene-mixture super-variety Benzol-Gemisch as products. As late as 1945, Gasolin was using its petrol-station attendant, nicknamed Tankfix, to advertise its "benzene mixture (without lead)"; a typical slogan found printed on advertising materials was "Der Tankfix deckt die Karten auf" ("Tankfix shows the cards"). An inflationary advertising hype spread from the USA to Germany around 1954, bringing petrol nicknames and chemical super-additives. Gasolin, apparently in the interests of its customers, countered these advertising excesses, and launched a successful customer survey. By 1959 the company had abandoned its benzene mixture, and sold petrol as Normal or Super, which cost about 6 pfennigs more.

Meanwhile, the oil continued to be sold as Motanol until in the 1960s it transitioned to Record via Motanol Record.

Gasolin's best-known slogan was "Take your time, not a life", which appeared on signs fixed on the back of trucks. These signs were produced by Gasolin until the mid-1950s.

A second slogan was "Mein Benzin - Gasolin!" ("My petrol: Gasolin!"), with a new little Gasolin-man figure; this appeared in full-page black-and-white newspaper advertisements, and in colour in tips-booklets produced from 1969 in cooperation with the Hamburg painter and commercial graphic artist, Bruno Bergner.

In 1963, the trademark changed, receiving a red, rectangular frame, and with the renaming in 1967, the lettering 'Gasolin' also became red.

== Gasolin nostalgia and the work of Bruno Bergner ==
Gasolin today is much loved by those who enjoy nostalgia over "Oldtimers", the German term for classic cars. Much of the historical image of Gasolin resulted from the long association between Gasolin and the German independent graphic artist, Bruno Bergner.

== See also ==
- Wintershall
- Leuna works

== Gasolin publications ==
- Mit Gasolin durch Deutschland. Eine Reisefibel für besinnliche Kraftfahrer ("With Gasolin through Germany: a travel-guide for contemplative drivers"), Deutsche Gasolin-Nitag AG (Publisher), Hannover 1958; Walter Pause (Text); Renate Maier-Rothe (Illustrations)

The 8 booklets of Gasolin-tips have outlasted Gasolin itself, and are still available:

- 50 Tips für Kraftfahrer ("50 tips for drivers"), Deutsche Gasolin-Nitag AG, Hannover 1957; Paul W. Piehler (Publisher); Paul W. Piehler, Heinz Restorff (Editors); Bruno Bergner, Hamburg (Cover and illustrations)
- 50 Touren-Tips für Kraftfahrer (50 touring-tips for drivers), Deutsche Gasolin-Nitag AG, Hannover 1958; Paul W. Piehler (Publisher); Heinz Restorff, Wilhelm Wißmüller (Editors); Bruno Bergner, Hamburg (Cover and illustrations)
- 50 Touren-Tips II für Kraftfahrer, Deutsche Gasolin-Nitag AG, Hannover 1959; Paul W. Piehler (Publisher); Heinz Restorff, Wilhelm Wißmüller (Editors); Bruno Bergner, Hamburg (Cover and illustrations)
- 50 Tips für Schlepperfahrer ("50 tips for artic-drivers"), Deutsche Gasolin-Nitag AG, Hannover 1959; Paul W. Piehler (Publisher); Heinz Restorff, Herbert Hardt (Editors); Bruno Bergner, Hamburg (Cover and illustrations)
- 50 Gasolin-Tips Auf Kriegsfuß mit Paragraphen ("50 Gasolin-tips at war with paragraphs"), Deutsche Gasolin-Nitag AG, Hannover 1960; Paul W. Piehler (Publisher); Heinz Restorff (Editor); Bruno Bergner, Hamburg (Cover and illustrations)
- Gasolin-Tips Sehenswürdigkeiten ("Gasolin-tips, things to see"), Deutsche Gasolin-Nitag AG, Hannover 1961; Paul W. Piehler (Publisher); Heinz Restorff (Editor); Bruno Bergner, Hamburg (Cover and illustrations)
- Gasolin-Tips Mit offenen Augen durch deutsche Städte ("Gasolin tips: with open eyes through German cities", Deutsche Gasolin-Nitag AG, Hannover 1962; Paul W. Piehler (Publisher); Heinz Restorff (Editor); Bruno Bergner, Hamburg (Cover and illustrations)
- Gasolin-Tips Autofibel für Rast und Reise ("Gasolin-tips: a car-guide for leisure and travel"), Deutsche Gasolin-Nitag AG, Hannover 1963; Paul W. Piehler (Publisher); Heinz Restorff (Editor); Bruno Bergner, Hamburg (Cover and illustrations)
