= Wintershall =

German oil and gas producer, 1894–2019

Wintershall Holding GmbH

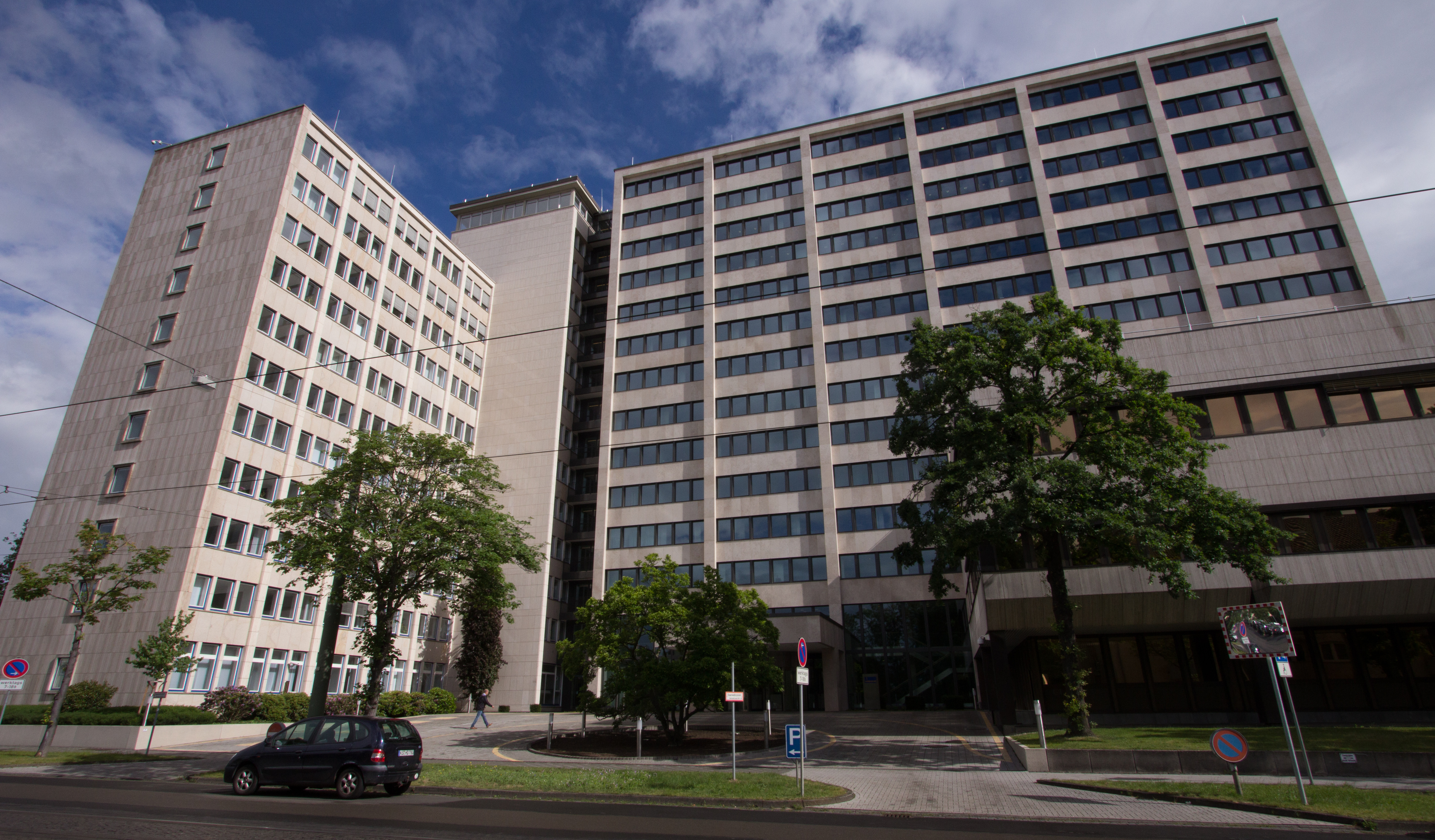
- Wintershall in Kassel
- Type: Subsidiary
- Industry: Mining of chemical and fertiliser minerals extraction of petroleum mining industry
- Predecessor: Burbach-Kaliwerke
- Founded: 13 February 1894; 132 years ago
- Fate: Merged with DEA to form Wintershall Dea in 2019
- Successor: Wintershall Dea
- Headquarters: Kassel, Germany
- Key people: Mario Mehren (2015-Present)
- Revenue: ▲€4.094 billion (2018)
- Operating income: ▲€1.733 billion (2018)
- Net income: ▲€829 million (2018)
- Number of employees: 2,000 (2015)
- Parent: BASF
- Website: www.wintershall.com

Wintershall Holding GmbH, based in Kassel, was Germany's largest producer of crude oil and natural gas. It was a wholly owned subsidiary of BASF. The company was active in oil and gas exploration and production with operations in Europe, South America, North Africa, and the Middle East. Their withdrawal from Russia, a key production area for the company, was announced in 2023. Wintershall employed more than 2,000 people worldwide. In the 2018 financial year, the company produced around 171 million barrels of oil equivalent (boe) of oil and gas, and revenues amounted to €4.09 billion.

On 1 May 2019, Wintershall merged with DEA to form Wintershall Dea. BASF holds 67% of the shares in the joint venture.

== History ==
=== The early years ===
Wintershall was founded on 13 February 1894 by mining entrepreneur Carl Julius Winter, together with mining-industrialist Heinrich Grimberg. It was originally set up as a civil engineering company to mine potash salt in the town of Kamen. The name Wintershall (pronounced: Winters·hall) is derived from the surname of Carl Julius Winter and the root word hal meaning "salt".

Ground was first broken on 23 April 1900 to drill the Grimberg shaft at Widdershausen, and the first Wintershall potash works were built in Heringen. Wintershall drilled further shafts in the Werra potash fields, building and acquiring other works in the region. From 1895 to 1913, the potash shafts drilled in the Werra Valley numbered 7 in Hesse and 21 in Thuringia.

In 1930, crude oil production was added to Wintershall's line of work when a leakage of crude oil into one of the potash shafts in Völkenrode turned out to be a promising prospect for Wintershall. The increasing motorization as well as the subsequent gathering of munitions for the war meant that crude oil was very much in demand. Hence, from then on Wintershall concentrated on developing crude oil resources.

=== The Third Reich ===
Wintershall benefited extensively from expropriation in Nazi Germany, the use of forced labourers and concentration camp internees, and from the politically active role of August Rosterg, who ran the company from World War I to the end of World War II.

Rosterg maintained close ties with the Nazi Party elite and met the commander of the SS, Heinrich Himmler, personally on several occasions. The American military government considered Rosterg, as a member of “Himmler’s circle”, to be a “captain of industry under the National Socialist regime”. Under his management, Wintershall was fully integrated in the NS system and acted in accordance with its goals.

In the 1930s, Wintershall took over Naphthaindustrie und Tankanlagen AG (NITAG), renaming it NITAG Deutsche Treibstoffe AG in 1938. NITAG had already been "Aryanised" by the time it was taken over, with the Jewish family Kahan no longer holding any shares in the company from 1932 at the latest. As a result, NITAG became the main sales subsidiary for mineral oil products alongside Mihag, Wiesöl and Wintershall Mineralöl GmbH.

Forced labourers were increasingly used during World War II. 1360 internees from the Buchenwald concentration camp had to work at Wintershall's Lützkendorf plant.

=== Post-war ===
In the post-war era, Wintershall lost a large oil refinery in Lützkendorf, some of its NITAG service stations and the potash shafts and works in Thuringia due to expropriation in the Soviet Occupation Zone. In 1951, Wintershall made its first natural gas discovery in Northern Germany.

In 1951, Wintershall made its first natural gas discovery in northern Germany. In 1952, Wintershall and DEA AG acquired the majority in Deutsche Gasolin AG in connection with the construction of the Emsland oil refinery. In 1956, Wintershall's sales subsidiary NITAG was merged with Gasolin AG to create Deutsche Gasolin Nitag AG, after which Wintershall became a co-owner of Aral AG by contributing its shares in NITAG and Gasolin.

In 1965, Wintershall took over Preussag's shares in the Buggingen potash mine.

=== Takeover by BASF ===
In 1969, the BASF Group took over Wintershall as it was an important supplier of raw materials and hence enabled BASF to secure the resources it needed. The potash mining operations were integrated into Kali und Salz AG in 1970. Since then, the company has focused on gas and oil. Wintershall's subsidiary Gasolin was merged with its sister company Aral in 1971.

In 1987, Wintershall began operating the Mittelplate drilling platform on the edge of the Schleswig-Holstein Wadden Sea National Park along with DEA in a 50:50 joint venture. More than 35 million tonnes of crude oil have been produced to date by the relatively small production island, which measures just 70 by 95 metres (230 by 312 ft). The Mittelplate offshore field contributes 55% to the German oil production.

=== 1990 to the merger ===
From the 1990s, Wintershall became increasingly involved in natural gas trading. An agreement on the marketing of Russian natural gas in Germany was signed with the Russian producer Gazprom in the autumn of 1990. The cooperation between companies from the Russian and German was concluded shortly before German reunification.

Wingas was founded in 1993 as a joint venture between Wintershall and Gazprom. European unbundling regulations meant that network operation and storage had to be split from natural gas trading and transferred to separate companies. Consequently, the new Wingas (natural gas trading only) and Wingas Transport were formed in 2010. As a result of an asset swap between BASF and Gazprom, the new Wingas and hence Wintershall's natural gas trading activities were fully transferred to Russian ownership in 2015. Alongside that move, the remaining company Wingas Transport was renamed Gascade in 2012. Gascade is part of the joint venture WIGA Transport Beteiligungs-GmbH & Co. KG (WIGA) between Wintershall Dea and Gazprom.

In 2010 the Wintershall Holding AG was transformed into Wintershall Holding GmbH.

Wintershall participated in the construction of Nord Stream 1 and Nord Stream 2 pipelines. was the company's response to rising demand for natural gas and falling production in Europe. Together with Gazprom and E.ON Ruhrgas, 55 billion cubic meters of transport capacities were generated in 2011 with the Baltic Sea pipeline. Wintershall has a 15.5 percent share in the pipeline.

=== Merger with DEA AG ===
A binding agreement to merge DEA and Wintershall was published on 27 September 2018. The merger was carried out with official approval in May 2019. It created Europe's leading independent gas and oil company. BASF holds 67% of Wintershall Dea and LetterOne holds 33% of the ordinary shares in Wintershall Dea. To consider the value of the midstream business of Wintershall Dea, BASF further received preference shares which results in a current overall participation of BASF of 72.7% in the entire share capital of the company. The preference shares will convert into ordinary shares of the company on 1 May 2022 or upon an initial public offering, whichever comes earlier.

== Operations ==
Wintershall had production locations in Germany, in the North Sea, Argentina, North Africa, the Middle East and Russia.

== Bibliography ==
- Klag, N.D.: "Die Liberalisierung des Gasmarktes in Deutschland" (the liberalisation of the gas market in Germany), Tectum Verlag DE, 2003.
- De Brabandere, E.; Gazzini, T.: "Foreign Investment in the Energy Sector: Balancing Private and Public Interests", Martinus Nijhoff Publishers, 6 Jun 2014.
