= Rafael Anton Irisarri =

- Rafael Anton Irisarri at Discovery Park, April 2010

Background information
- Origin: United States
- Genres: Post-minimalism, drone, 20th century classical, contemporary classical
- Occupations: Composer, producer, multi-instrumentalist
- Years active: 2005–present
- Labels: Room40, Ghostly International, Miasmah, Immune, Touch
- Website: irisarri.org

Rafael Anton Irisarri is a United States composer, multi-instrumentalist, producer and mastering engineer based in New York. He is predominantly associated with post-minimalist, drone and electronic music. Irisarri is also known for being the main member of electronic music/shoegaze act The Sight Below, and signed to American label Ghostly International.

== Influences ==
Irisarri is influenced by classical composers like Mahler, Satie, Debussy, and Wagner as well as contemporary musicians like Kevin Shields, Robin Guthrie, and Harold Budd. He also cites French existentialist philosopher Albert Camus and Uruguayan short story writer Horacio Quiroga as influences, and lists Le Petit Prince by Antoine de Saint-Exupéry as one of his all-time favorite books. He considers filmmakers David Lynch, Jan Švankmajer, Werner Herzog, and Julio Medem as continuous sources of inspiration.

In a radio interview with the ABC in Sydney, Irisarri goes into further detail, describing to Quiet Space radio host Paul Gough the process behind The North Bend as inspired by "this region (American Pacific Northwest), and not just with the fairly obvious 'rainy, gloomy skies' clichés, but more in the folk, cultural traditions and pop-culture references (think of David Lynch and his television-defining narrative Twin Peaks). They sort of helped me create an audio postcard of this beautiful area of the United States."

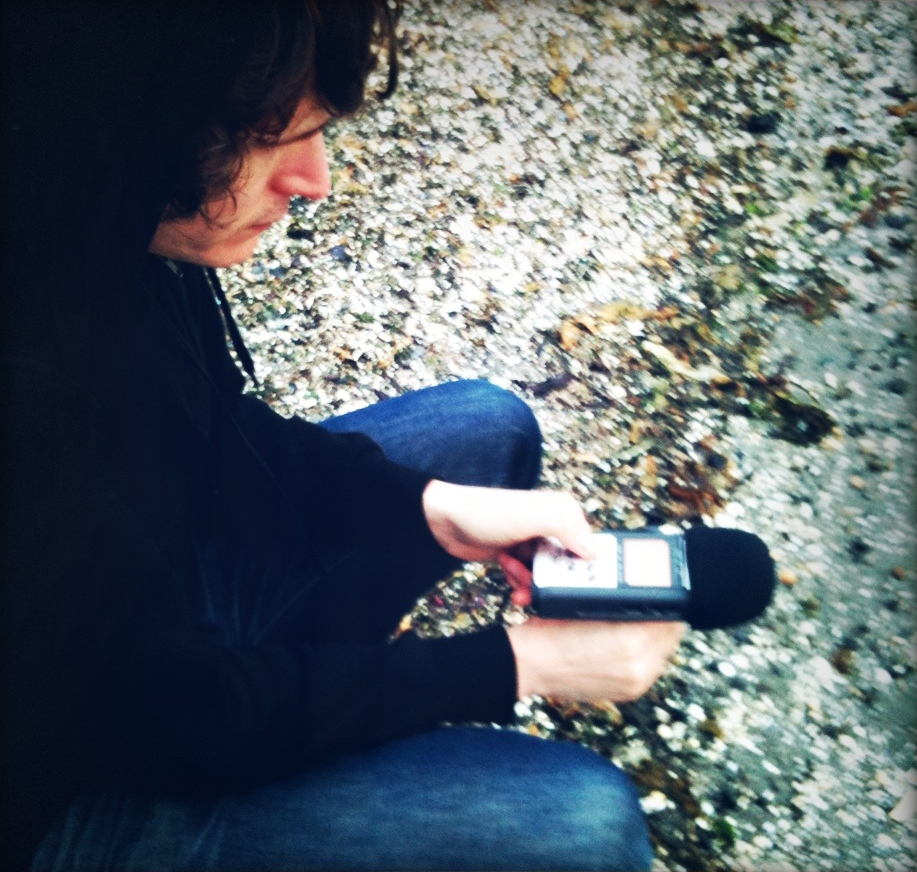
Irisarri field recording on the Puget Sound in 2010

== Live performances ==
Irisarri playing bowed guitar at MITO Settembre Musica Festival in Milan, 2009

Irisarri travels frequently to perform live throughout Europe, North America, Australia and the Middle East. Highlights include concerts at Barcelona's Sónar, Detroit's DEMF, Montreal's MUTEK, and Kraków's Unsound. Aside from electronic music festivals, Irisarri has presented his works at multidisciplinary arts events, including Milan's prestigious MITO SettembreMusica festival and Israel Festival in Jerusalem.

In his live performances, Irisarri utilizes real-time signal processing, chaining together a series of custom-made looping software to achieve the textural density of his recorded works and favors improvised performances. This characteristic has earned Irisarri recognition from peers like Pantha Du Prince.

Irisarri performing live at St. Catherine's during Unsound Festival in Kraków, 2008

In December 2010, Irisarri released, through his Bandcamp store, a collection of live recordings performed at selected cities worldwide.

== Collaborations ==
In the studio, Irisarri has worked extensively with Simon Scott, Tiny Vipers, Benoît Pioulard, Goldmund and remixed School of Seven Bells, Balmorhea, Detroit's Echospace, and Germany's Pantha Du Prince. Live, he has collaborated with Australian artist and Room40 label curator Lawrence English, Portland's Grouper, and Italian electro-acoustic composer Andrea Belfi.

In 2010, Irisarri collaborated twice with Austrian guitarist Fennesz, performing together live at Interferenze Festival in Italy and later at Decibel Festival in Seattle.

In May 2010, Irisarri traveled to Jerusalem to collaborate with Koen Holtkamp, Greg Davis, Ido Govrin, Ran Slavin and Yair Etziony in a two-day audiovisual performance piece titled Dissolving Localities, which explored the city's diverse cultures and unique sights and sounds. The project was commissioned as part of Israel Festival.

On January 21, 2011, Irisarri and Benoît Pioulard released a cover version of Broadcast's "Until Then" (from the band's 2000 album The Noise Made by People), as a tribute to Trish Keenan. Later that year, the collaboration spawned into a full, new project, called Orcas. Their debut album was released in April 2012 on Morr Music.

As a media artist, Irisarri has prepared, created and performed live video for Fennesz, Lusine, Simon Scott, Solvent, and The Sight Below.

== Discography ==
Studio albums

- (2007) Daydreaming, 12-inch LP/CD/Digital, Miasmah (NO)
- (2010) The North Bend, 12-inch LP/CD/Digital, ROOM40 (AU)
- (2010) Reverie, 12-inch mini-LP/Digital, Immune (US)
- (2013) The Unintentional Sea, 12-inch LP/CD/Digital, ROOM40 (AU)
- (2015) A Fragile Geography, 12-inch LP/Digital, ROOM40 (AU)
- (2017) The Shameless Years, 12-inch LP/Digital, Umor Rex (MX)
- (2017) La Equidistancia (with Leandro Fresco), 12-inch LP/Digital, A Strangely Isolated Place (US)
- (2018) Sirimiri, Cassette/Digital, Umor Rex (MX)
- (2018) El Ferrocarril Desvaneciente, Cassette/Digital, Umor Rex (MX)
- (2019) Solastalgia, 12-inch LP/Digital, ROOM40 (AU)
- (2020) Una Presencia En La Brisa (with Leandro Fresco), 12-inch LP/Digital, A Strangely Isolated Place (UK)
- (2020) Peripeteia, 12-inch LP/Digital, Dais Records (US)
- (2022) Sacred Hatred, Digital, Black Knoll Editions (US)
- (2022) Sacred Variations, Digital, Black Knoll Editions (US)
- (2022) Agitas Al Sol, 12-inch LP/Digital, ROOM40 (AU)
- (2024) Midnight Colours, 12-inch/Digital, Black Knoll Editions (US) Remastered, originally released in 2018
- (2024) Façadisms, 12-inch/Digital, Black Knoll Editions (US)
- (2026) Points Of Inaccessibility, 12-inch/Digital, Black Knoll Editions (US)

Studio EPs

- (2009) Hopes and Past Desires 7-inch EP/Digital, Immune (US)
- (2015) Will Her Heart Burn Anymore, CDR/Digital, ROOM40 (AU)
- (2017) La Espera (with Leandro Fresco), 10-inch EP/Digital, A Strangely Isolated Place (US)
- (2017) THESIS 10 (with Julianna Barwick), 10-inch EP, THESIS (US)
- (2023) Distance, Digital, Black Knoll Editions (US) Remastered, originally released in 2010

Live albums

- (2010) "Live", Own label (US)
- (2023) "Encore (Live at Cafe OTO) feat. Rachika Nayar, Dear Laika, James Heather", Digital, Black Knoll Editions (US)

Compilations

- (2009) Still – Musique Pour Statue Menhirs CD/Digital, Arbouse Recordings (FR)
- (2009) Abandoned (Too Soon) – Unreleased Tracks 2009 CD/Digital, Fugues (FR)
- (2010) These Red Winters – Keys (A Comprehensive Collection of Contemporary Piano Compositions) 12-inch LP/Digital, American Typewriter (ES)
- (2010) Distance – Room40 10-Year Anniversary compilation CD/Digital, ROOM40 (AU)
- (2010) Path – Various, 10-inch CD/Digital, The Wire (UK)
- (2011) Gnossienne No. 1 (with Goldmund) – Erik Satie et les nouveaux jeunes CD/Digital, Arbouse Recordings (FR)
- (2011) Moments Descend on My Windowpane – SMM: Context 12-inch LP/CD/Digital, Ghostly International (US)
- (2022) Thalasso (with Julianna Barwick) - For Ukraine Vol. 2 LP/Digital, Headphone Commute (UK)

Remixes

- (2008) Papercutz – Ultravioleta Remixes, "Ultravioleta" (The Sight Below rmx), CD/Digital, Apegenine recordings (CA)
- (2009) Balmorhea – All Is Wild, All Is Silent Remixes, "Harm and Boon", 12-inch LP/CD/Digital, Western Vinyl (US)
- (2010) CV313 – Subtraktive (King Midas Sound / The Sight Below Mixes), "Subtraktive" (The Sight Below remix), 12-inch EP/Digital, Echospace Detroit (US)
- (2011) Pantha Du Prince – XI Versions of Black Noise, "A Nomad's Retreat" (The Sight Below version), 12-inch LP/CD/Digital, Rough Trade (UK)
- (2011) The Sight Below / Biosphere – "N-Plants_Remixes", 12-inch EP, Touch (UK)
- (2013) TNAF – Passive Me Aggressive You, "The Sun" (The Sight Below remix), Digital (iTunes exclusive), Fiction Records (UK)
- (2013) Saroos – "Seadance" (The Sight Below remix), Digital (iTunes exclusive), Alien Transistor (DE)
- (2014) TNAF – In Rolling Waves, "Waltz" (The Sight Below remix), Digital (iTunes exclusive), Fiction Records (UK)

Guest appearances

- (2009) Simon Scott – Navigare, Spring Stars 12-inch LP/CD/Digital, Miasmah (NO)

== See also ==
- List of ambient music artists
- List of experimental musicians
