= USS Orca =

USS Orca has been the name of more than one United States Navy ship, and may refer to:

- USS K-3 (SS-34), a submarine in commission from 1914 to 1923 that was named USS Orca (SS-34) until renamed K-3 in 1911 while under construction
- USS Orca (SP-726), a patrol vessel in commission from 1917 to 1918
- USS Sand Lance (SS-381), a submarine in commission from 1943 to 1946 and in 1963 that prior to being laid down on 12 March 1943 was projected to be named USS Orca (SS-381), her name being changed to USS Ojanco (SS-381) on 5 September 1942 and finally to USS Sand Lance (SS-381) on 24 September 1942
- USS Orca (AVP-49), a seaplane tender in commission from 1944 to 1947 and from 1951 to 1960
