= Orcas (duo) =

- Origin: Seattle, Washington, United States
- Genres: Dreampop, ambient pop, electronic
- Years active: 2012–present
- Label: Morr Music
- Members: Rafael Anton Irisarri; Benoit Pioulard
- Website: http://www.facebook.com/weareorcas

Orcas is a musical collaboration between Pacific Northwest minimalist composer Rafael Anton Irisarri and multi-instrumentalist singer-songwriter Benoit Pioulard.

On January 21, 2011, Irisarri and Pioulard released a cover version of Broadcast's "Until Then" (from the band's 2000 album The Noise Made By People), as a tribute to the late Trish Keenan. Later that year, the collaboration spawned into a full, new project, called Orcas.

The duo's self-titled debut LP was released in April 2012 on Germany's Morr Music imprint. Together they combine their distinct individual approaches to composition, melody, texture and rhythm into "a genuine, coherent album that conjures immense shadows and immense depths worthy of its namesake." Irisarri's trademark tonality and analog scratchiness is heard throughout the record. Orcas toured throughout 2012 in Europe and in select cities in North America.

The artwork for their debut record was created by audio/visual artist Sean Curtis Patrick of The Attempted Theft of Millions. The cover depicted a hand holding a small Kachina Doll in Polaroid SX-70 film. Patrick also created the music video "Arrow Drawn" and accompanying visual projections for live shows.

Their debut self-titled album was listed as one of 2012's best records by numerous blogs and websites.

Morr Music announced in January 2014 that Orcas will release their second album entitled Yearling later in April. This announcement was accompanied by a promo video made by their visual collaborator Sean Curtis Patrick. The press release stated "For 'Yearling', ORCAS members Benoît Pioulard and Rafael Anton Irisarri (The Sight Below) teamed up with Martyn Heyne (of Efterklang) on guitar and piano, and Michael Lerner (Telekinesis) on drums to build upon the subdued ambience of their self-titled debut, adding a huge dose of analog warmth to their hazy pop leanings."

== Discography ==
- Orcas (2012)
- Yearling (2014)
- How To Color A Thousand Mistakes (2024)
