= Benoit Pioulard =

American singer-songwriter

Benoît Pioulard
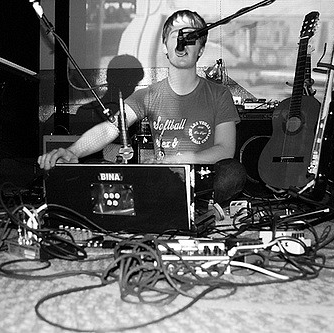

Background information
- Born: Thomas Meluch; August 4, 1984 (age 41)
- Origin: Michigan, U.S.
- Genres: Electronic, ambient, folk, shoegaze
- Years active: 2001–present
- Labels: Kranky, Moodgadget, Ghostly International, A Remarkable Idea

Thomas Meluch (born August 4, 1984) is an American multi-instrumentalist, writer, and photographer, best known by his pseudonym Benoît Pioulard.

His music signed to Kranky Records.

== Biography ==
Meluch began documenting field recordings and his own lo-fi compositions on dictaphones, discarded stereos and four-track machines in the mid 1990s, later focusing on highly limited CD-R and cassette releases of his experimental, folk-influenced songs for friends and family.

His first recordings as Benoît Pioulard appeared on the Random Number...Colors Start compilation released by the Ann Arbor-based Moodgadget label in 2004. After 2005's Enge EP Meluch was signed to Chicago's Kranky imprint, for whom he recorded the albums Précis (2006),Temper (2008), Lasted (2010), Hymnal (2013), Sonnet (2015), and The Benoit Pioulard Listening Matter (2016), as well as Lignin Poise (2017) for Beacon Sound, and Sylva (2019) for Morr Music.

In 2010, Meluch formed Orcas with minimalist composer Rafael Anton Irisarri. The duo's self-titled debut was released in April 2012 on Germany's Morr Music imprint, and its follow-up Yearling was released in early 2014.

Meluch lives in Brooklyn, New York.

== Discography ==
=== Solo ===
- Blurred CD-R (self-released, 2001)
- Clear CD-R (self-released, 2001)
- Skymost CD-R (self-released, 2003)
- Enge 7-inch EP (Moodgadget, 2005)
- Dakota / Housecoat CD-R (self-released, 2006)
- Précis CD (Kranky, 2006)
- Fir 7-inch EP (Type, 2007)
- Temper LP (Kranky, 2008)
- Lee 7-inch (Hall Of Owls, 2008)
- Flocks 7-inch (Blue Flea, 2009)
- Lasted LP (Kranky, 2010)
- Plays Thelma EP (Desire Path Recordings, 2011)
- Hymnal LP (Kranky, 2013)
- Sonnet LP (Kranky, 2015)
- Noyaux EP (Morr Music, 2015)
- Seize/Marre EP (self-released, 2016)
- The Benoit Pioulard Listening Matter (Kranky, 2016)
- Radial CD-R (self-released, June 27, 2016)
- Slow spark, soft spoke (Dauw, 2017)
- Lignin Poise (Beacon Sound, 2017)
- Persona (Mellotron, 2019)
- Sylva (Morr Music, 2019)
- Bloodless (Disques d'Honore, 2021)
- Eidetic (Morr Music, 2023)
- Stanza IV (Disques d'Honore, 2025)

=== Collaborations ===
- Deck Amber (with Ant'lrd) LP (Sounds et al, 2018)
- I Suppose I'm Your Future (with The Humble Bee) (Dauw, 2019)
- Communiqué (with Jogging House) (self-released, 2022)
- Konec (with Viul) (A Strangely Isolated Place, 2022)

=== Appeared on ===
- Random Number...Colors Start (Moodgadget, 2004)
- Idol Tryouts 2 (Ghostly International, 2006)
- The Rorschach Suite (Moodgadget, 2006)
- Four-beat Rhythm: The Writings of Wilhelm Reich (Workshop, 2013)
- Sensorimotor (track 6: "Witness") – Lusine (Ghostly International, 2017)
