= Alfa-Bank =

Russian banking and financial services corporation

Alfa Bank JSC
- Native name: Альфа-банк АО
- Company type: Joint stock company
- Industry: Financial services
- Founded: 20 December 1990; 35 years ago
- Headquarters: Moscow, Russia
- Number of locations: 486 offices
- Products: Retail banking; corporate banking; investment banking; insurance; private banking; private equity; mortgage loans; credit cards; investment management; wealth management; asset management; mutual funds; exchange-traded funds; index funds
- Net income: ▲US$ 1.35 billion (2020)
- Total assets: ▲US$ 61.85 billion (2020)
- Total equity: ▲US$ 8.67 billion (2020)
- Owner: Mikhail Fridman; Pyotr Aven; German Khan
- Number of employees: 26,008 (2020)
- Rating: Ba2 (Moody's), BB+(S&P), BBB− (Fitch) (2021)
- Website: alfabank.ru

Alfa-Bank JSC (Russian: Альфа-банк АО) is the largest of the private banks in Russia. It was founded in 1990 by Russian businessman Mikhail Fridman, who remains the controlling owner. Headquartered in Moscow, it operates in seven countries, providing financial services to 22 million active corporate customers and over 1 million active retail clients as of 2021. On 1 March 2022, Mikhail Fridman and Pyotr Aven left the bank's board of directors after coming under EU sanctions imposed in response to the 2022 Russian invasion of Ukraine. For the same reason, the bank has been sanctioned by US and EU authorities beginning in February 2022 and 2023, respectively.

== History ==
Timeline:

=== 1990s ===
- 1990 – Alfa-Bank founded as a partnership with limited liability by Russian entrepreneur Mikhail Fridman.
- 1991 – Licence to banking operations received from Central Bank of Russia and first corporate accounts open.
- 1992 – Central Bank grants more licences for broader activities. Alfa-Bank opens first nostro accounts in six foreign banks. First retail branch opens in Moscow.
- 1993 – Alfa-Bank becomes a member of Moscow Interbank Currency Exchange. General license to banking operations received from Central Bank. Alfa-Bank starts dealing in government bonds (GKOs and OFZs).
- 1994 – Alfa-Bank becomes a member of MasterCard/Europay international credit card system and joins the Society for Worldwide Interbank Financial Telecommunication. Pyotr Aven appointed as bank's president. Alfa-Bank becomes the first Russian bank to open a subsidiary in Almaty, Kazakhstan.
- 1995 – Euromoney ranks Alfa-Bank third in its category for "Best Russian Banks in 1995". Alfa-Bank joins Factors Chain International. A representative office opens in London, United Kingdom.
- 1996 – Alfa-Bank joins Euroclear Bank and Visa International. It becomes one of the three participants in the first Eurobonds issue by Russian government since the October Revolution. Alfa-Bank opens a branch in Nizhniy Novgorod.
- 1997 – Alfa-Bank draws a $40 million syndicated loan. Euromoney declares Alfa-Bank "The Best Bank in Russia in 1997". First credit ratings received from Moody's and Standard & Poor's (S&P). Alfa-Bank places its first issue of $175 million, 3-year Eurobonds, becoming the first privately owned Russian bank to issue Eurobonds. Branches in Saint Petersburg and Samara open. The value of total assets passes $1 billion.
- 1998 – Alfa-Bank is reorganized from a limited liability company into an open joint stock company. Euromoney ranks Alfa-Bank "Best Bank in Russia" for the second consecutive year. Alfa-Bank merges with Alfa Capital, then a sister company of Alfa Group. A subsidiary bank opens in Novosibirsk, Russia's third most populous city.
- 1999 – Euromoney and Global Finance name Alfa-Bank "Best Russian Bank" despite the financial crisis. Fourteen new retail branches and offices open across Russia.

=== 2000s ===
- 2000 – Alfa-Bank acquires a 76% stake in Kyivinvestbank (later renamed "Alfa-Bank"). The Banker and Global Finance magazine name Alfa-Bank "The Best Russian Bank". Alfa Securities, a broker and a subsidiary, opens in London.
- 2001 – By the end of first quarter, the bank's loan portfolio reaches $1 billion; Alfa-Bank opens a subsidiary in New York City, Alfa Capital Markets, an NASD (now Financial Industry Regulatory Authority (FINRA)) regulated company set up to provide brokerage and investment services in North and South America. Emerging Markets Investor and Global Finance name it "Best Bank in Russia". Alfa-Bank becomes the 100 percent owner of Amsterdam Trade Bank N.V. and thereby acquires a full banking licence in the European Union.
- 2002 – Gazprom and Alfa-Bank reach an agreement on strategic partnership. Together with Merrill Lynch, Alfa-Bank wins financial consulting contract from Unified Energy System. Fitch and S&P upgrade their credit rating on Alfa-Bank. Once again Global Finance magazine names Alfa-Bank "Best Russian Bank".
- 2003 – Unaudited financial statements reveal record high growth in profits in 2002 (the bank's loan portfolio increases 70% to $1.4 billion, assets surge by 51%, while net income rises by more than a third). Alfa-Bank, in partnership with the Lauder Institute of the Wharton School of Business, establishes a new award for "Excellence in Foreign Investment", to be presented to foreign companies operating in Russia for weighty contribution to corporate governance and successful business operations. Alfa-Bank draws an $82 million unsecured syndicated loan, the biggest on record among private banks. S&P, Fitch, and Moody's upgrade Alfa-Bank's rating during the year.
- 2004 – Alfa-Bank tops the list of financial consultants by deals value, completing $8.9 billion worth of transactions in 2003. Alfa-Bank's loan portfolio grows by 52% year-over-year, reaching $2.8 billion. It wins a $10 million defamation settlement against the Russian newspaper Kommersant, which had published an article on financial difficulties at the bank, which suffered a substantial run on deposits and contributed to a mini banking crisis over the summer.

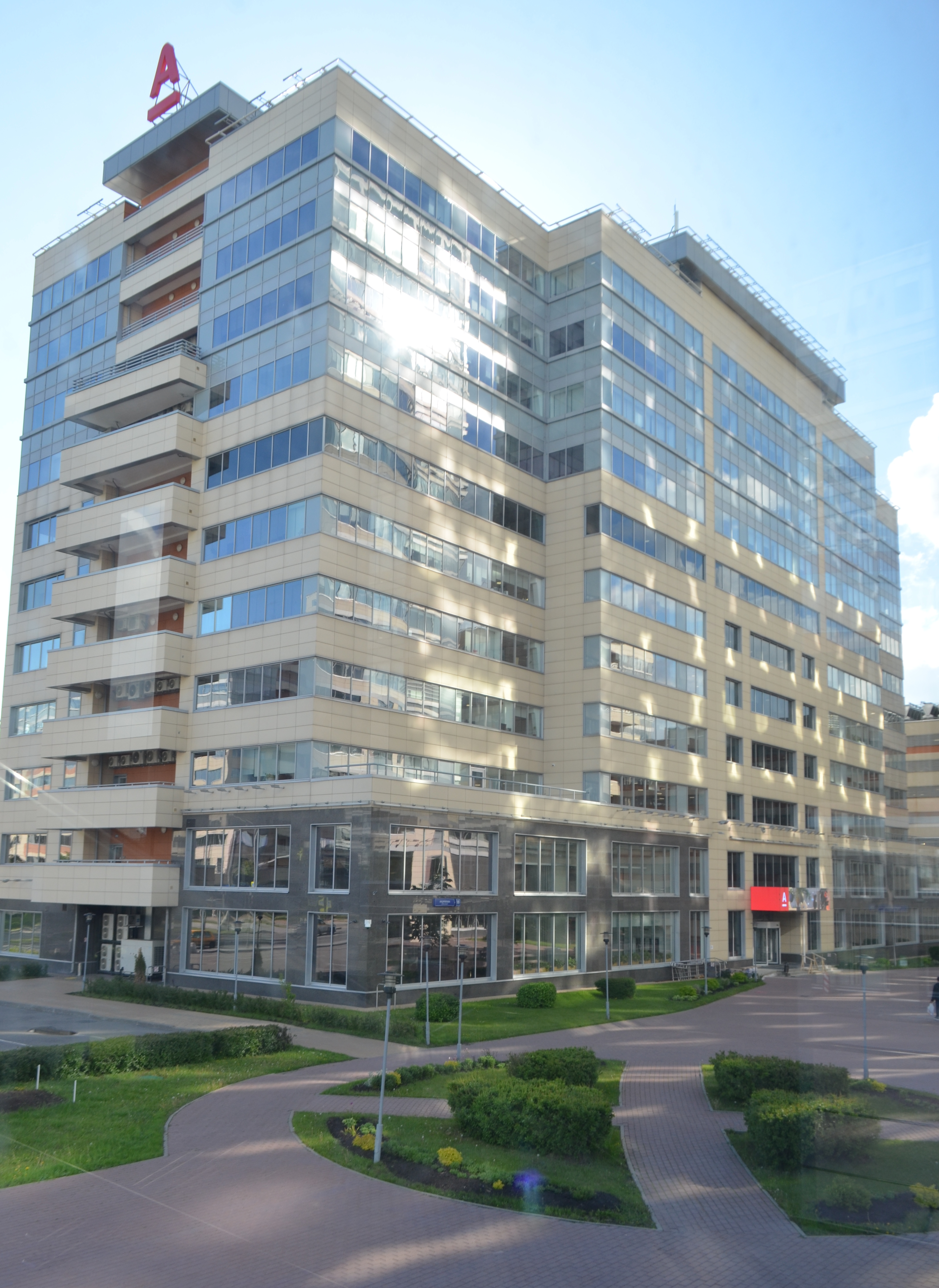
Alfa-bank headquarters in Moscow (2021)

- 2006 – Alfa-Bank completes the country's first securitisation of diversified payment rights with a $350 million deal. Unaudited first quarter management International Financial Reporting Standards figures show total assets breaking the $10 billion mark for the first time in the company's history.
- 2007 – Alfa-Bank is raided by Russian police in September in connection with the closure of Sodbiznesbank in 2004. Fitch upgrades Alfa-Bank's rating.
- 2008 – Alfa-Bank seeks a $400 million government loan in October. It distributes 20,000 Aladdin eToken USB smartcard devices to its online customers. The bank acquires Severnaya Kazna, a major regional bank operating in the Urals region.
- 2009 – Fitch downgrades Alfa-Bank's rating.

=== 2010s and 2020s ===
- 2010 – Alfa-Bank launches a $1 billion 7-year Eurobond.
- 2011 – Alfa-Bank seeks to buy Bank of Moscow, but the sale goes to VTB Bank.
- 2012 – In cooperation with Euroset, Alfa-Bank launches a loyalty card credit programme.
- 2014 – The "Alfa-Amway" Russian loyalty card programme is created when Amway joined with Alfa-Bank.
- 2016–2017 – It is reported in several media outlets that there had been activity between computer servers belonging to Alfa-Bank and the Trump Organization, an accusation that has been discredited. The FBI investigated the activity in the context of links between Trump associates and Russian officials and concluded that this activity was not part of those links and that there might be "an innocuous explanation, like marketing email or spam". Through September 2021, U.S. government investigators had been unable to explain the activity, though a 2018 analysis had concluded there were "reasons to doubt that marketing emails were the cause". A Senate report accepted the FBI's assessment that the activity was "unlikely to have been a covert communications channel" but said there was no explanation for this "unusual activity." In May 2022, Clinton's former campaign manager said that Hillary Clinton had approved of a plan to pitch the now-discredited accusation to the media.

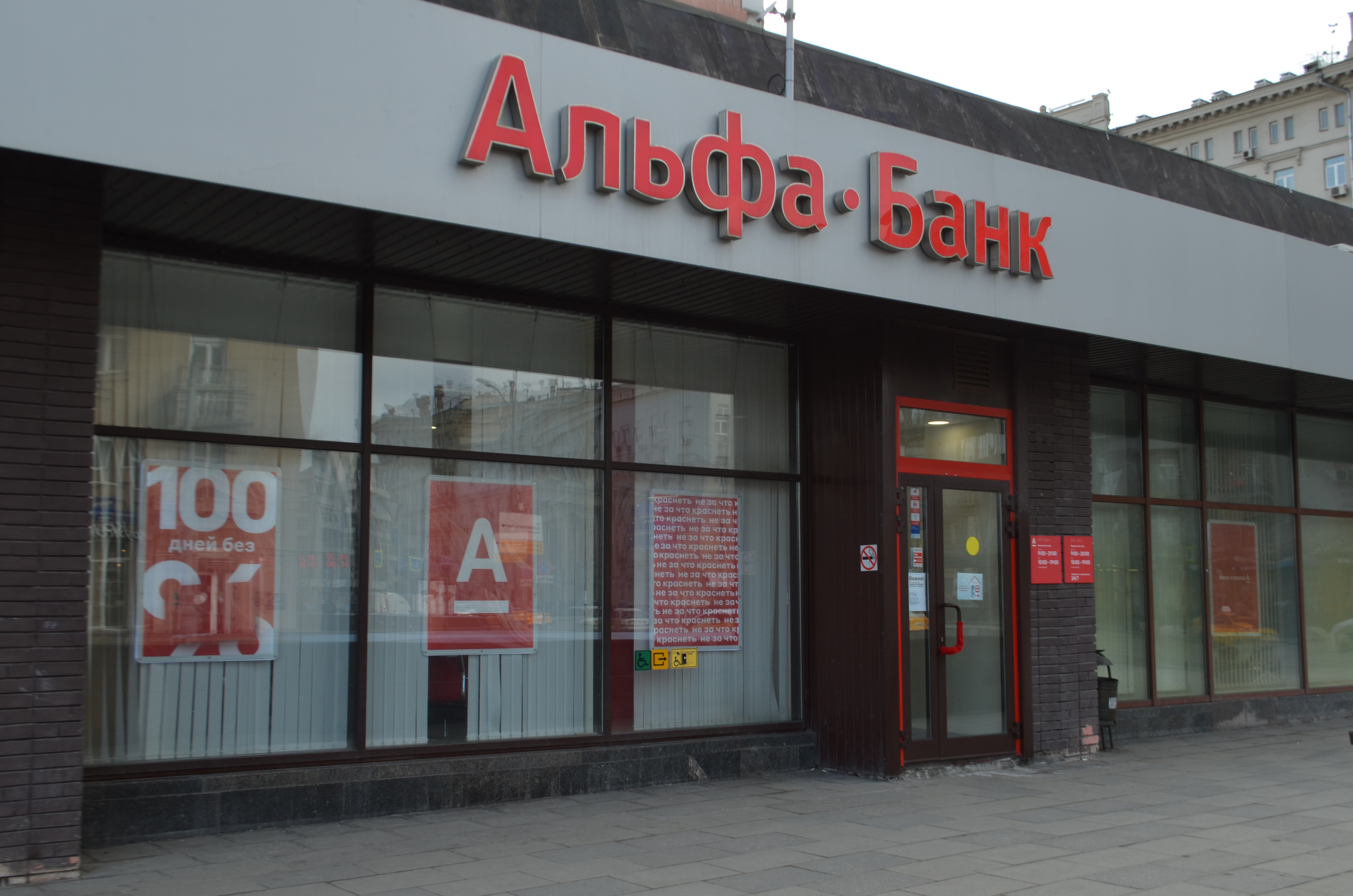
Alfa Bank branch in Moscow (Zemlyanoy Val Street), Russia (2020)

- 2017 – In March, Alfa-Bank is the target of Ukrainian protests.
- In July, BuzzFeed News reports that, from December 2014 to the summer of 2017, numerous suspicious money transfers were made between Paul Erickson's accounts, including Wells Fargo Bank accounts, an undisclosed law firm, the NRA of America, (Note: The NRA reported spending a record $54,398,558 to support Republicans ($17 million) and oppose Democrats ($37 million) during the 2016 United States elections with $30 million directly supporting Donald Trump's 2016 election campaign; however, FBI and other organizations' investigations including the NSA, the CIA, the DNI, the DOJ, and the Treasury Department's FinCen, which began in the spring of 2016 and later led to Crossfire Hurricane, James Clapper's, Michael Rogers's, and James Comey's January 2017 DNI findings, Mueller's special investigations and Senate Intelligence Committee investigations, revealed that the NRA spent at least $70 million or more. Jones Day is the law firm that represents the NRA and also Pyotr Aven's Alfa-Bank and Mikhail Fridman's Alfa Group.) Jack Abramoff's son Alex and Abramoff's brother Robert's company Landfair Capital Consulting, which was founded in March 2017, and Maria Butina's Alfa-Bank account. Investigators from Wells Fargo reported these suspicious money transfers to the United States Treasury's Financial Crimes Enforcement Network (FinCEN) and to the FBI.
- In December, Alfa-Bank's wholly owned Dutch subsidiary, Amsterdam Trade Bank, is raided in connection with an investigation into possible money laundering.
- 2019 – According to IFRS Results for 2019, Alfa-Bank's total comprehensive income amounts to $1.03 billion. The bank's total equity increases to $8.1 billion. At the same time, net profit was only $704 million, almost half of 2018 – due to a radical increase in allowances for loan loss provisions.
- 2022 – Alfa-Bank made a deal with the Kazakh bank "CenterCredit", on the sale of a subsidiary bank "Alfa-Bank Kazakhstan", which fell under anti-Russian sanctions in March this year. In May, the Kazakh bank CenterCredit bought Alfa-Bank Kazakhstan (a subsidiary of the Russian Alfa-Bank, which at that time was under the sanctions of the UK, the EU and the USA). The new owner renamed the bank to Eco Center Bank. On May 18, 2022, Ruslan Vladimirov was appointed Chairman of the Board of Eco Center Bank.

== Charity ==
Since 2004, Alfa-Bank has been assisting "Life Line", a charity programme for aiding seriously ill children. Alfa-Bank was the first company to organise a collection of private donations to the foundation. Since September 2008, bank customers have the opportunity to transfer cash donations to help children with the help of the Alfa-Click Internet Bank or a conventional bank transfer without a bank commission. The bank also cooperates with WWF, supports most of its initiatives, and also invites its clients to provide financial support to the fund.

The bank operates a volunteer organization called "Give Kindness". The bank collects humanitarian aid for orphanages, boarding schools and social shelters, and also attracts employees as volunteers. Every year, the bank organizes charity events called "Children's Day", "Help Me Get Ready for School", and "Christmas Miracle".

== Education ==
Since 1995, the bank has run the "Alfa-Chance" student scholarship programme, which gives school graduates from various regions of Russia the opportunity to receive higher education at leading universities in the country. Since 2008, Alfa-Bank, in cooperation with HSE, has run a programme to provide nominal scholarships to first-year students from Russian regions (except Moscow and St. Petersburg) who have won prizes at All-Russian School Olympiads and the HSE Multi-Profile Olympiad. In total, the "Alfa-Chance" program involves about 17 higher education institutions. The bank operates the Alfa Fellowship Program, which enables young specialists from the United States, Great Britain and Germany to undergo an internship in Russia.

In 2025, Alfa-Bank launched the "Alfa-Future" platform to support students, educators, and the development of educational infrastructure across Russia. The initiative is backed by ₽3 billion in funding and covers 300 universities and approximately 3 million students. The program provides grants and scholarships, supports master's programs, academic departments, and international schools, and organizes nationwide hackathons.

== Culture ==
Alfa-Bank plays an active role in developing cultural and educational activities, primarily to support national art. On 7 June 2000, the Ministry of Culture of the Russian Federation and Alfa-Bank signed a cooperation agreement, under which the participants agreed to work together to organise joint cultural events and creative projects. Every year, exhibitions and concerts are held with the support of a bank in Russia. In addition, Alfa-Bank participates in the organisation of exhibitions and concerts by Russian cultural figures abroad. For example, on 18 February 2000, a concert by the Moscow Virtuosos Symphony Orchestra conducted by maestro Vladimir Spivakov was held in London. It was the orchestra's first performance in London for 10 years. The presentation was sponsored by Alfa-Bank. Alfa-Bank and the Moscow Literary Fund run a scholarship support programme for writers, aimed at motivating authors to create new works of literature: prose, poetry, drama, translations, and books for children.

The bank is also one of the co-founders of the "Big Book" National Literary Award.

Alfa-Bank periodically sponsors or participates in the organisation of concerts by foreign stars in Russia, including Bono (2010), Elton John (1995, 2001, and 2007), Aerosmith (2007), Sting (1996, 2001, and 2006), Whitney Houston (2004), and Paul McCartney (2003 and 2004). Some of the singers invited were performing in Russia for the first time. Alfa-Bank also organises an electronic music and technology festival called Alfa Future People. Headliners have included stars of the world electronic scene such as Paul Oakenfold, Avicii, Skrillex, Pompeya, Tesla Boy, and Infected Mushroom, among others.

In July 2014, Alfa-Bank announced the launch of the City Tours with Alfa social project. The Bank provides financial and organisational support to the country's best museums, as well as tour bureaus supporting the development of city tours in Russia.

In early 2021, Alfa-Bank hired the Russian rapper Morgenshtern as a "youth director". This was preceded by the appearance of a scandalous video in which the Federal Antimonopoly Service found violations of Russian advertising law. The singer's task was to attract 100,000 young new clients. Some experts see this venture as a reputational risk. After an administrative case was initiated against Morgenshtern in April 2021 for drug propaganda, Alfa-Bank disavowed previous messages and called them an "advertising stunt".

== Awards ==
2025

- Alfa-Bank received two prestigious awards from the Hong Kong Equity Investment Association. The bank was honored with the Digital Banking Innovation Award for its outstanding achievements in digitalizing traditional banking services and implementing advanced technologies such as artificial intelligence, big data analytics, and blockchain. These innovations have significantly improved operational efficiency, enhanced user experience, and strengthened transaction security and data protection. Additionally, Alfa-Bank was recognized with the Excellence in Digital Transformation Award for setting new benchmarks in the fintech industry. The bank’s initiatives, including its smart mobile application with personalized financial advice and voice interaction features, as well as the use of advanced data analytics and automation in credit assessment and internal processes, were highlighted as exemplary contributions to the advancement of digital banking .
- On March 21, 2025, experts at The FinTech India Innovation Awards recognized Alfa-Bank's achievements and innovations in technology at South Asia's largest technology exhibition, the FinTech India Expo. The bank won in two categories: Global Leader in Fintech and Best Global Use of AI in FinTech .
- Alfa-Bank received the World-Class Technology Leadership Award in the category World-Class Technology Leader from The Economic Observer, a leading Asian business publication, in recognition of its achievements in business and fintech .
- In May 2025, Alfa-Bank was named the Leader in FinTech Solutions by Fortune Times, a leading economic publication in Singapore and Southeast Asia. The jury recognized the bank for its innovative use of artificial intelligence, blockchain, and machine learning. In particular, it highlighted Alfa-Bank’s implementation of AI-driven recruitment systems that accelerate the hiring process, as well as automated planning tools that increased customer service efficiency by 35%.

== Technology ==
- Alfa-Bank has joined forces with MasterCard to launch the production of AlfaPay wristwatches with an integrated debit bank card, based on PayPass technology. Purchases can be made without entering a PIN code or sign. The card shows its number and CVC-code to pay for online purchases.
- Alfa-Bank has developed the Alfa-Touch app. It allows users to create a non-personalised card for one year and pay for purchases using the PayPass system.
- Contactless ATMs have operated in the bank's branches since December 2015. The installation of such ATMs was aimed primarily at improving security (preventing fraudsters from reading magnetic strip data), and also allows quicker interaction with the device.
- Alfa-Bank has cooperated with prostheses manufacturer Motorika to develop bioelectric prostheses with a special mount for a PayPass contactless payment card. This development is aimed at reducing inconveniences for people with disabilities when making purchases. To pay for a product or service, it is sufficient to place the prosthesis near the terminal and confirm the operation with a PIN code if the total exceeds 1,000 rubles. In addition, this prosthesis works with other devices equipped with contactless card readers.
- At the end of 2016, Alfa-Bank's A-Club Private Banking topped the "Best Russian Bank for Millionaires" list compiled by Forbes. It was ranked 4th among non-state Russian banks.

== Protection of business reputation ==
On 21 January 2014, Alfa-Bank and Mikhail Fridman filed a lawsuit for the protection of their business reputation against the chairman of the Yabloko Party, Sergei Mitrokhin, the editorial staff of the Izvestia newspaper and a correspondent from the newspaper. They considered that statements made by Mitrokhin and Izvestia that "Alexei Navalny is carrying out political orders from the Alfa Group" did not correspond to reality and discredited their business reputation. However, the court refused to satisfy the company's claim against Mitrokhin.

== Jones Day ==
In the United States, the Jones Day law firm represents numerous Russian entities, including Alfa-Bank and Alfa Group.

== Sanctions ==
On February 23, 2022, Russian President Vladimir Putin announced the beginning of military operations in Ukraine, launching an invasion. This prompted countries to impose severe economic sanctions on Russian individuals, companies, and banks in addition to those placed on Russia in response to the 2021-2022 Russo-Ukrainian crisis. On 24 February 2022, U.S. President Joe Biden announced sanctions on several Russian banks, including Alfa-Bank; the restrictions include "dealings in new debt of greater than 14 days maturity and new equity". Alfa-Bank's press service made a statement in the Russian press that these sanctions would not affect the bank's operations.

In April, Apple removed the Alfa-Bank application from its App Store. Already downloaded versions continued to work. In August, the “Деньги пришли” (Money Came) application appeared in the App Store, replicating the functionality of the official Alfa-Bank application, but developed by a third-party company. Other Russian banks have resorted to similar measures before, but "alternative" applications were cleared out in about a week.

The EU adopted sanctions in its 10th package in February 2023. The UK first imposed sanctions on 24 March 2022, increased in March 2023 and in December 2023 increased them again to include a prohibition on correspondent banking relationships.

== See also ==
- Alfa Corp. v. OAO Alfa Bank
- List of banks
- List of banks in Russia
