= Trade Bank =

Trade Bank may refer to:

- Amsterdam Trade Bank
- Joson Trade Bank
- Trade Bank of Iraq
