= Alfa Corp. v. OAO Alfa Bank =

- Court: United States District Court for the Southern District of New York
- Full case name: Alfa Corporation v. OAO Alfa Bank and Alfa Capital Markets (USA), Inc.
- Decided: February 21, 2007
- Docket nos.: 1:04-cv-08968
- Counsel for plaintiff: Juan C. Basombrio, Esq. of Dorsey & Whitney LLP
- Citation: 475 F. Supp. 2d 357

Court membership
- Judge sitting: James C. Francis IV

Alfa Corp. v. OAO Alfa-Bank, 475 F. Supp. 2d 357 (S.D.N.Y. 2007), was a trademark case brought to the U.S. District Court for the Southern District of New York. The case eventually allowed Wikipedia to be used as a legitimate source. The underlying trademark dispute was settled out of court.

== Background ==
The case was a trademark dispute centered around the use of the name Alfa. Alfa Corporation, of Montgomery, Alabama sued the Russian company Alfa-Bank for trademark infringement. Alfa Corporation of Alabama is commonly known as Alfa Insurance, while the Russian Alfa-Bank is part of the larger Alfa Group of companies.

Alfa Corporation of Alabama is commonly known as Alfa Insurance. The company primarily offer insurance, but it also owns subsidiaries that provide services in the banking industry.

Alfa-Bank is a unit of the Russian-based finance company Alfa Group, which provides financial services, primarily in Russia and surrounding countries, but also in Europe and the United States. The name Alfa-Bank is a transliteration of the company's Russian name of Альфа-Банк.

In the case, Alfa Insurance argued that Alfa Group's name would harm Alfa Insurance as it was likely to cause confusion between the two companies. Alfa Insurance argued that Alfa Group was committing trademark infringement.

== Evidence ==
Plaintiff Alfa Corp. sought to introduce the expert testimony of Constantine Muravnik. Mr. Muravnik was to testify as to the transliteration of the Russian name into English. The defendants Alfa-Bank objected to the introductions of the expert witness and sought to have the testimony excluded.

The plaintiff sought to introduce the expert testimony of Muravnik's regarding the proper transliteration of the defendant company's name. Muravnik is a native Russian speaker who is now Senior Lector in Slavic Languages and Literatures specializing in Russian at Yale University. He has taught Russian since 1991 and also worked for over ten years as a Russian/English interpreter and translator. Muravnik holds master's degrees in Russian Linguistics and Literature from Moscow State University and in Slavic Languages and Literatures from Yale University; he is currently a Ph.D. candidate at Yale.

The sum and substance of Mr. Muravnik's Report and his deposition is that the “best way to render the name ... in English” is as “Alpha Bank,” rather than “Alfa-Bank.” In formulating this opinion, Mr. Muravnik relies largely on his background and experience as “an educated native speaker of Russian.” Mr. Muravnik's report also references The Transliteration of Modern Russian for English-Language Publications, by J. Thomas Shaw (the “Shaw treatise”), which he calls the most “authoritative” book on the subject, and an entry on “Transliteration of Russian Into English,” from the online encyclopedia Wikipedia. Mr. Muravnik also consulted informally with a colleague in the Slavic Languages Department at Yale. For examples of transliteration of the word Mr. Muravnik drew heavily on online sources, including the internet version of the Russian newspaper Pravda, and the website of Human Rights House, an international non-governmental organization.

The defendants object to Mr. Muravnik's testimony on the grounds that his opinions should be excluded because they are based on "inherently unreliable" internet sources. The defendants cite both Mr. Muravnik's references to Wikipedia and his use of internet sites such as the online version of Pravda.

The court held that the use of internet sources (in general or the specific ones used by Mr. Muravnik) in forming the basis of expert testimony is not inherently unreliable. The court cited a recent and highly publicized analysis in the magazine Nature which found that the error rate of Wikipedia entries was not significantly greater than in those of the Encyclopædia Britannica. Jim Giles, Internet Encyclopaedias Go Head to Head (Dec. 14, 2005) (finding that “the difference in accuracy was not particularly great: the average science entry in Wikipedia contained around four inaccuracies; Britannica, about three.”)

Furthermore, the court noted that Alfa Group was unable to identify any errors in Muravnik's testimony. Therefore, despite the potential liability of Wikipedia, references it alone does not make an expert's testimony inadmissible in court.

== Outcome ==
The underlying trademark dispute was settled out of court. Alfa Group agreed not to infringe on Alfa Insurance's trademarks. No money was exchanged in the settlement.
