= Aleksandr Torshin =

Russian politician (born 1953)

- Александр Торшин
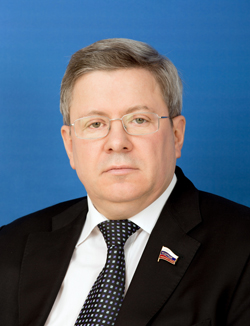
- Torshin in 2013

Deputy Governor of Central Bank of Russia
- In office 2015–2018

Russian Federation Senator from the Mari El Republic
- In office 26 January 2001 – 20 January 2015
- Preceded by: Seat established
- Succeeded by: Svetlana Solntseva

Acting Chairman of the Federation Council
- In office 19 May 2011 – 21 September 2011
- Preceded by: Sergey Mironov
- Succeeded by: Valentina Matviyenko

Personal details
- Born: Aleksandr Porfiryevich Torshin; November 27, 1953 (age 72) Mitoga, Kamchatka Oblast, Russian SFSR, Soviet Union
- Children: 2 daughters

Aleksandr Porfiryevich Torshin (Russian: Алекса́ндр Порфи́рьевич То́ршин; born 27 November 1953) is a Russian politician. He has the federal state civilian service rank of 1st class Active State Councillor of the Russian Federation. He served in the Federation Council of Russia, from 2001 to 2015. He was its acting Chairman for four months in 2011. As of July 2018, he is a deputy governor of the Central Bank of Russia. Torshin is from the Mari El Republic, and has represented it in parliament.

Allegations have been made about his involvement with the Taganskaya Gang. (Note: Allegedly, Alexander Romanov, who is the leader in Spain of the Taganskaya OPG (Russian: Таганская ОПГ), refers to Torshin as his 'godfather' according to the Spanish Civil Guard. According to the Spanish Civil Guard, Alexander Romanov is an intermediary between Torshin and Igor Zhirnokleev (also spelled Zhirnokleyev) (Russian: Игорь Жирноклеев) who is the leader of the Taganskaya OPG.) Torshin denied the allegations.

== Biography ==
He graduated from the All-Union Legal Correspondence Institute with a degree in law in 1978. From 1990 to 1991 he was an employee of the department for relations with socio-political organizations of the apparatus of the CPSU Central Committee.

From 1995 to 1998 he was the State Secretary of the Bank of Russia, was responsible for interaction with government bodies, public organizations and the media. During this time, he allegedly met with Alexander Romanov often.

In 1998, he assumed the authority of a representative of the government of the Russian Federation in the State Duma in the rank of deputy head of the government apparatus.

From 1999 to 2001, he worked as Deputy General Director – State Secretary of the State Corporation "Agency for Restructuring Credit Organizations".

In January 2001, Alexander Torshin becomes a member of the Federation Council from the government of the Russian Republic of Mari El.

In January 2002, he was appointed deputy chairman of the Federation Council.

In August 2004, he joined the ranks of the party "United Russia".

In September 2008, Torshin became the first deputy chairman of the Federation Council.

From May 18 to September 21, 2011, served as chairman of the Federation Council. He served in the Federation Council of Russia, the upper house of the Russian parliament, from 2001 to 2015, and as its acting Chairman for four months in 2011. During his time as a senator, he was on Russia's powerful National Anti-Terrorism Committee for more than a decade. Torshin, originating from the Mari El Republic, a republic in Russia, is a leading figure in the ruling United Russia party.

There have also been accusations made that he is a leading figure within the Russian mafia.

Republican Dana Rohrabacher called Torshin "sort of the conservatives' favorite Russian".

Torshin is closely associated with Vyacheslav Vasilyevich Kalashnikov (Russian: Вячеслав Васильевич Калашников), who is president of the private military contractor (PMC) Moran Security Group (MSG), a colonel in the FSB reserve and an adviser to Russian Senator Torshin. In 2013, Vyacheslav Kalashnikov interviewed prospective candidates who formed the Slavonic Corps. (Note: Allegedly, the late Dmitry Utkin (aka "Wagner"), who was an anti-Semitic and had been a member of the Slavonic Corps, recruited former members of the Slavonic Corps, especially paratroopers, former special forces (OMON, SOBR, Spetsnaz, etc.) and marines, to form the Yevgeny Prigozhin associated Wagner Group (aka the "orchestra").)

== Career ==
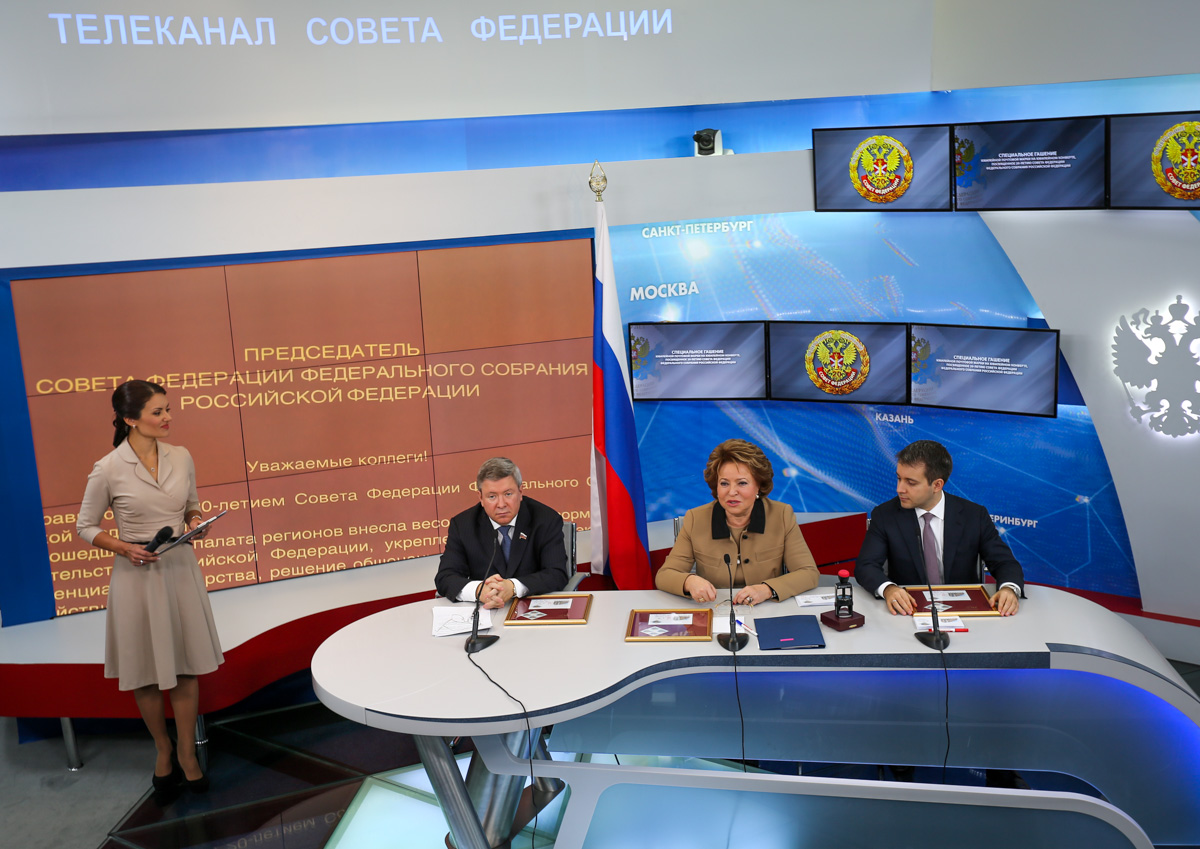
Torshin and Valentina Matviyenko in 2013

Some time between 1995 and 1998, Torshin was State Secretary of the Central Bank of Russia. Torshin entered the Federation Council of Russia in 2001. He became the acting chairman for the succeeding Sergey Mironov on May 19, 2011, after Mironov was ousted by the majority United Russia in the Council. Torshin remained as acting chairman until the election of Valentina Matviyenko also from the United Russia Party. She assumed her responsibilities on September 21, 2011. He remained in the Federation Council until 2015. Torshin was appointed the deputy head of the Central Bank of Russia in 2015 and suddenly retired in 2018.

== Allegations in Spain ==
In 2016, a Spanish investigation connected Torshin with Alexander Romanov, the leader of the Taganskaya Gang, who had been arrested in Spain and sentenced to four years in prison in May 2016 for illegal transactions. Torshin was allegedly involved in money laundering for the gang. According to Spanish police, he gave instructions to members of the Gang on laundering, through banks and real estate in Spain. They concluded that in the structure of the organized criminal group, Torshin "stood higher" than Romanov. As a result of wiretapping, which took place several months before the arrest of Romanov, Spanish intelligence agencies concluded that Romanov was following financial orders from Torshin, and that Torshin himself could be the manager of the assets of the gang. Romanov's properties in Spain, 80% of which Spanish police believe belong to Torshin, have been confiscated.

Spanish police had planned to arrest Torshin in 2013 when he arrived in Mallorca for a friend's birthday party, but he did not arrive. Spanish police speculated he might have been tipped off by Russian authorities.

In 2018, wiretappings from the Spanish police were handed over to the FBI. When asked if this had any relationship with politics in the US, José Grinda, a Spanish prosecutor, replied "Mr. Trump's son should be concerned."

== Involvement in U.S. politics ==
Between 2011 and 2018, Torshin and his assistant (sometimes described as his associate or representative) Maria Butina, established a cooperative relationship between the National Rifle Association of America (NRA) and the Russian-based "Right to Bear Arms" which Butina founded in 2011. Torshin has been attending NRA annual meetings in the United States since at least 2011. Following the 2011 meeting, then NRA President David Keene expressed his support for Torshin's "endeavors" and extended an invitation to the 2012 meeting. Torshin attended every NRA annual meeting between 2012 and 2016, occasionally with Butina, and has met every NRA president since 2012. Torshin has tweeted that he and Butina are the only two Russians he knows of who are lifetime NRA members. Butina and Torshin attended the 2014 NRA annual meeting as special guests of former NRA president Keene.

Torshin has been a subject of an investigation by the Senate Intelligence Committee into Russian interference in the 2016 United States elections. In January 2018, McClatchyDC reported that Robert Mueller's Special Counsel investigation is pursuing allegations that Torshin has links to Russian organized crime, and laundered money from the Russian government to the NRA to benefit Trump's campaign. Torshin is also the subject of a probe by the Federal Bureau of Investigation into whether the Russian government attempted to illegally funnel money to the NRA in order to help Trump win the presidency. On May 16, 2018, the Senate Intelligence Committee released a report stating it had obtained "a number of documents that suggest the Kremlin used the National Rifle Association as a means of accessing and assisting Mr. Trump and his campaign" through Torshin and Butina, and that "The Kremlin may also have used the NRA to secretly fund Mr. Trump's campaign." Most of that money was spent by an arm of the NRA that is not required to disclose its donors. In April 2018, the United States Department of the Treasury's Office of Foreign Assets Control imposed sanctions on 23 Russian nationals, including Torshin, whose assets in the United States were frozen and whose entry into the United States barred, besides being subject to other financial disabilities.

The New York Times reported on July 17, 2018 that Torshin was scheduled to visit the White House in 2017, but the meeting was canceled after a national security aide noted Torshin was under investigation by Spanish authorities for money laundering.

== Political Positions ==
Torshin was the author of a draft law granting the Constitutional Court of Russia the authority to block the enforcement of judgments issued by the European Court of Human Rights.

He has expressed support for introducing a system of private prisons in Russia, modeled on practices in the United States.

He has advocated for the legalization of civilian use of short-barreled firearms.

He has supported the transfer of orphans from the Far North and the Russian Far East to families in the Caucasus region.

Torshin has also called for stricter criminal penalties, including chemical castration for convicted pedophiles, classifying financial crimes on par with terrorism, and imposing life sentences for drug trafficking offenses.

== See also ==
- Timeline of Russian interference in the 2016 United States elections
