= Slavonic Corps =

Russian Hong Kong-registered military contractor

- Dates active: January 2012 – October 2013
- Headquarters: Hong Kong
- Active regions: Deir ez-Zor Governorate
- Size: 267 (October 2013)
- Wars: Syrian civil war

The Slavonic Corps (Russian: Славянский Корпус) was a firm that was established on 18 January 2012 and was registered in Hong Kong as a private military contractor (PMC). It operated during the Syrian civil war for 113 days, after which many of its fighters established the Wagner Group.

== Formation ==
According to media reports, the Slavonic Corps was registered in Hong Kong by two employees of the private security company Moran Security Group, Russian nationals Vadim Rudolfovich Gusev (Russian: Вадим Рудольфович Гусев), who was the deputy director, and Yevgeniy Sidorov (Russian: Евгений Сидоров). (Note: From the Moran Security Group (MSG) official website: "we are an international group of companies providing a range of services in the field of security, consulting, transportation and medical support." The company specializes in a full range of ship escort services - from logistics to security. In general, the company has been engaged in the safety of tankers beginning in 2001, according to a Fontaka article, and, as early as 2006, according to Moran Security Group, local security personnel were successfully trained to provide VIP support services. Since 2010, it has been actively engaged in operations protecting merchant ships from pirate attacks in the Red Sea, Gulf of Aden, Somalia and the Indian Ocean. Moran Security Group also maintains a presence in Nigeria and the Gulf of Guinea. Since 2012, a division of the Moran Security Group owns the Myre Seadiver which was a former a former Norwegian offshore rescue vessel that was converted into a vessel for security tasks and was employed by Sovcomflot (Russian: «Совкомфлот»), the United Cargo Fleet (Russian: Объединённый грузовой флот) and other companies. As of 2015, the MSG owned fleet included four vessels: Ratibor (ESU2529), Maagen (E5U2139), Anchor 1 (E5U2491) and Deo Juvante (E5U2630). Although MSG is registered in Belize, the British Virgin Islands firm Neova Holdings Ltd holds a 50% stake in MSG. As of autumn 2013, Boris Georgievich Chikin (Russian: Борис Георгиевич Чикин), who is a weapons specialist, and Vyacheslav Vasilyevich Kalashnikov (Russian: Вячеслав Васильевич Калашников), who is the MSG president, a colonel in the FSB reserve and, later, an adviser to Russian Senator Alexander Torshin while the Slavonic Corps existed, are co-owners of Moran Security Group which is headquartered at Potapovsky Lane, house 5, in Moscow. Allegedly, Bashar al-Assad is a client of MSG.) (Note: The address for the Slavonic Corps in Saint Petersburg was at 5 Alexander Blok Street, in the Baltic Shooting Center (Russian: «Балтийский стрелковый центр») which also was headed by Boris Chikin.) Vadim Gusev held all 10,000 shares of the Hong Kong-based company.

In the spring of 2013, job ads by a Hong Kong-based company emerged on various Russian military related websites. The ads promised 5,000 USD per month for guard duties protecting Syrian energy facilities during the Syrian civil war. The ads attracted the attention of former members of OMON, SOBR, VDV and Spetsnaz; many of them had previous military experience in the Tajikistani Civil War as well as the Second Chechen War.

== Deployment ==
In 2013, after initially arriving in Beirut, Lebanon, the PMCs were first transferred to Damascus, Syria and then to a Syrian army base between Latakia and Tartus. (Note: The base between Latakia and Tartus was at a hippodrome which was occupied by Syrian reservists. Staying in a stable, the Slavonic Corps, by October 2013, had 267 people divided into two companies: one company was staffed by Cossacks from the Kuban and the other by people from all over Russia including 10 to 12 people from St. Petersburg. The Slavonic Corps commanders said that the Slavonic Corps would have an increase of 2,000 in Syria. Later, in 2015, the base had Russians supporting the Syrian Army 4th Corps.) (Note: Allegedly, a Syrian oligarch with Assad's consent requested the Slavonic Corps.) The Syrian Ministry of Energy and the Energy Energy Company hired the Slavonic Corps to protect the oil fields in the Deir ez-Zor region between Homs and Deir Ez Zor, but, on 18 October 2013, while traveling from Latakia to the place of execution of tasks, (Note: On 18 October 2013, the Slavonic Corps was alerted from Homs and was on the more than 230 kilometres (140 mi) trek to the neighboring city of Al-Sukhnah when the attack occurred.) the convoy was drawn into a clash with units of the Islamic State. By October, the Slavonic Corps had a strength of 267 contractors divided into two companies that were present in Latakia. At least 9 GRU officers were allegedly in their ranks.

The contractors were provided with outdated equipment which raised concerns among the participants. They soon realized that the FSB and the Syrian government had no involvement with the operation. Those wishing to return to Russia were left with no choice but to earn their ticket back through direct participation in the Syrian civil war. The new goal of the Slavonic Corps was described as guarding the oil fields of Deir ez-Zor. Instead of the promised T-72s, the contractors were provided with buses covered in metal plates. En route to Deir ez-Zor, the column encountered a Syrian air force helicopter which collided with a transmission line and crashed into the caravan, injuring one of the contractors.

On 18 October, the column received orders to reinforce Syrian army forces in the city of Al-Sukhnah. Three hours into its journey, the column came under attack. With the aid of a Syrian army self-propelled gun and air support from a single fighter jet, the contractors assumed a defensive position. Jaysh al-Islam fighters numbering from two to six thousand men (according to the Russians) attempted a pincer movement. Vastly outnumbered, the contractors retreated to their vehicles as a desert storm covered the battlefield. In the aftermath of the battle, six Slavonic Corps members were wounded. Having failed to achieve their objectives, the group returned to Russia.

Upon arriving at Vnukovo International Airport, the participants were detained by the FSB on suspicion of acting as mercenaries, which is punishable under Article 359 of the Russian criminal law. Despite the fact that the company was registered in Hong Kong, the owners, Gusev and Sidorov, were also charged, sent to Lefortovo Prison, and convicted in October 2014.

Igor Girkin (Strelkov), who was the deputy commander of the Second Russian Volunteer Detachment (RDO-2) the "Tsar's Wolves" during the Yugoslavia Wars and was the head of the security service of the Konstantin Malofeev associated Marshall Capital, is a strong supporter of the Slavonic Corps. (Note: Allegedly, Dmitry Utkin (aka "Wagner") was associated with the Slavonic Corps and, later, the Yevgeny Prigozhin associated Wagner Group (aka the "orchestra") which trained near the Don federal highway M 4 at the Molkino (Russian: Молькино) GRU base base (Goryacheklyuchevsky garrison), after its more than 50 million rubles modernization by JSC Garrison (Russian: АО «Гарнизон») during early 2015 to provide a training ground for troops using night vision devices, (Note: Located at the Molkino base are the 1st Guards Missile Brigade (military unit 31853), the 10th separate special forces brigade of the GRU of the Ministry of Defense (military unit 51532), as well as the 243rd combined arms training ground (military unit 55485).) at Molkin (Russian: Молькин) near Goryachy Klyuch which is in the Goryacheklyuchevsky district (Russian: Горячеключевский район) (Belorechensky District) and 40 kilometres (25 mi) from Krasnodar. Allegedly, Utkin, an anti-Semitic, recruited numerous members of the Slavonic Corps, especially paratroopers, former special forces (OMON, SOBR, Spetsnaz, etc.) and marines, to support Russia's interests, in 2014, during the Crimea referendum and war in Donbas often as "cleaners" («чистильщиков») in Luhansk, and, in 2015, Syria before the start of air attacks by Russian forces.)

A few years after his imprisonment, Yevgeny Sidorov was released and he became the executive officer of PMC Redut, a private military company associated with the business of Gennady Timchenko and the GRU. In 2019, Sidorov became the owner of Redut-Security LLC.

== See also ==
- Wagner Group
- Belligerents in the Syrian civil war
