= Maria Butina =

Russian activist and spy (born 1988)

Maria Butina MP
- Мария Бутина
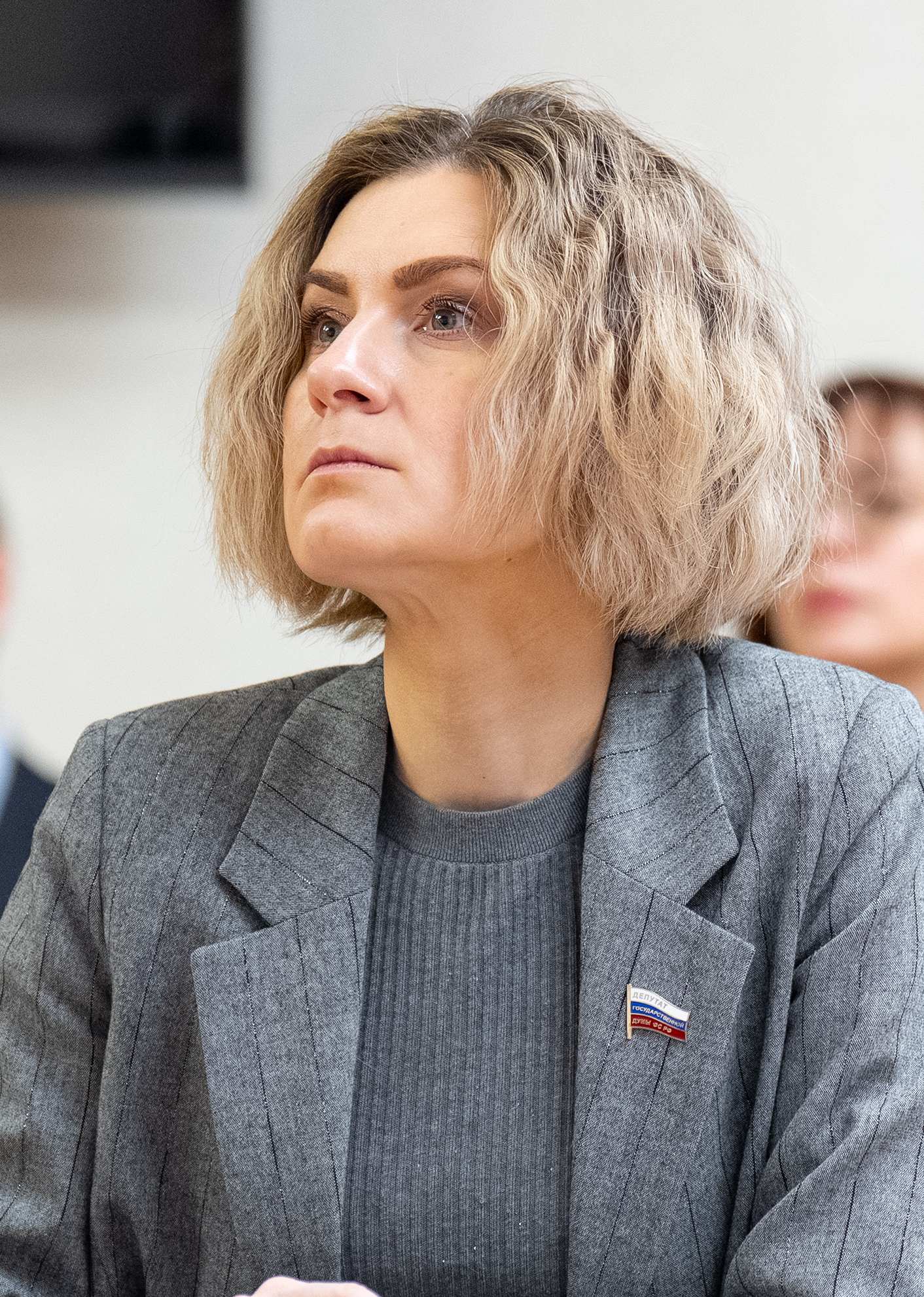
- Butina in 2025

Member of the State Duma (Party List Seat)
- In office 12 October 2021 – 30 September 2026

Personal details
- Born: 10 November 1988 (age 38) Barnaul, Russian SFSR, Soviet Union
- Party: United Russia
- Parent: Valery Viktorovich Butin (father)
- Education: Altai State University (BA); American University (MIA)
- Criminal information
- Status: Released (25 October 2019)
- Convictions: Conspiracy to Act as an Agent of a Foreign Government (1 count, 26 April 2019)
- Criminal charge: 18 U.S.C. § 951 Conspiracy to Act as an Agent of a Foreign Government (5 counts)
- Penalty: 18 months in prison

Details
- Date apprehended: 15 July 2018

Maria Valerievna Butina (Note: Given name is sometimes transliterated as Mariya or Mariia) (Russian: Мари́я Вале́рьевна Бу́тина; born 10 November 1988) is a Russian politician, political activist, journalist, and former entrepreneur who was convicted in 2018 of acting as an unregistered foreign agent of Russia within the United States.

Butina worked as an assistant for Aleksandr Torshin, a former member of the Federation Council, member of Vladimir Putin's United Russia party, and deputy governor of the Central Bank of Russia. In this role, she tried to infiltrate conservative groups in the US, including the National Rifle Association, as part of an effort to promote Russian interests in the 2016 United States presidential election. The Senate Intelligence Committee later concluded that she attempted to persuade the Trump campaign to establish a secret communications back channel with Russia.

In July 2018, while residing in Washington, D.C., Butina was arrested by the FBI and charged with acting as an agent of the Russian Federation "without prior notification to the Attorney General." In December 2018, she pleaded guilty to felony charges of conspiracy to act as an unregistered foreign agent of the Russian state under 18 U.S.C. §951. In April 2019, a federal judge sentenced her to 18 months in prison. She served around five months at Tallahassee Federal Correctional Institution. Her 9-month pretrial prison term was counted towards her sentence. She was released and deported back to Russia in October 2019. She publicly denied being a Russian spy. In 2021, she was elected to the State Duma as a member of United Russia.

== Early life and education ==
Butina was born on 10 November 1988, in the Siberian city of Barnaul, in Altai Krai, about 210 miles (340 km) east of the present Kazakhstan–Russia border. Her mother was the chief engineer of an energy enterprise and her father Valery Viktorovich Butin was an entrepreneur who established a furniture manufacturing business in Barnaul. She has one sister and one maternal niece, Kira.

She graduated with honors at the age of 17 from Gymnasium Number 22 with in-depth study of the English language, and from school years she strove for active public activity. She studied political science at Altai State University and also received a teaching degree. At age 19, she was elected to the public council of Altai Krai in the last direct election for the council.

== Business and lobbying career ==
At 21, Butina launched a furniture retail business in Altai Krai. In 2011, she moved to Moscow and sold six of her seven furniture stores to start an advertising agency.

Further in 2011, Butina founded Right to Bear Arms (Russian: Право на оружие), described as a Russian gun-rights organization. She began traveling back and forth to the US, initially with Aleksandr Torshin, who was then a Senator in the Federation Council of Russia (and a half-month later became Acting Chairman/Speaker of this Senate of Russian Federation) and a leading member of United Russia. He had hired her as his "special assistant" that year. In 2012, they lobbied the council to expand gun rights. Butina resigned from her position as the head of Right to Bear Arms in late 2014.

According to Russians interviewed by RFE/RL, the organization was notable for avoiding opposition to Putin during the 2011–2013 Russian protests, for its "quixotic" support for a cause with little public support and strong government opposition – Putin himself had told Russians "I am deeply convinced that the free flow of firearms will bring a great harm and represents a great danger for us" – for introducing legislation in the Russian parliament that "never went anywhere", and for receding from public view after Butina stepped down as its head. According to US prosecutors who prosecuted Butina on charges of conspiracy and acting as a foreign agent, her love of guns was a ruse to advance Russia's agenda within the Republican Party. Anders Åslund described Right to Bear Arms as a "front organization with the purpose of infiltrating American groups and forging cooperation with the National Rifle Association of America."

In 2013, she met Republican political operative Paul Erickson in Russia. The two became close, started dating, and eventually moved in together. In 2015, she emailed him a description of a proposed project to influence the Republican Party to be friendlier to Russia, through the NRA. In January 2015, Torshin became deputy governor of the Central Bank of Russia, and Butina worked as his special assistant until May 2017. In 2017, Butina told The Washington Post that she never worked for the Russian government.

In August 2016, she moved to the US on a student visa and enrolled as a graduate student in the School of International Service at American University. While a student at American University, Butina got drunk on at least two separate occasions and bragged to her fellow students about her contacts in the Russian government; on both occasions, her classmates reported her to law enforcement, sources told CNN.

In February 2016, Butina and Erickson began a South Dakota business, Bridges LLC. Erickson later said the company was established in case Butina needed any monetary assistance for her graduate studies. In 2018, she completed a master's degree in international relations.

== Involvement in U.S. politics ==
=== National Rifle Association ===
As part of her work as a foreign agent, Butina worked to infiltrate the National Rifle Association on behalf of Russia.

Torshin and Butina established a cooperative relationship between the NRA and Right to Bear Arms. Torshin has attended NRA annual meetings in the United States since at least 2011. Following the 2011 meeting, then NRA President David Keene expressed his support for Torshin's "endeavors" and extended an invitation to the 2012 meeting. Torshin also attended NRA annual meetings in 2012 and 2013.

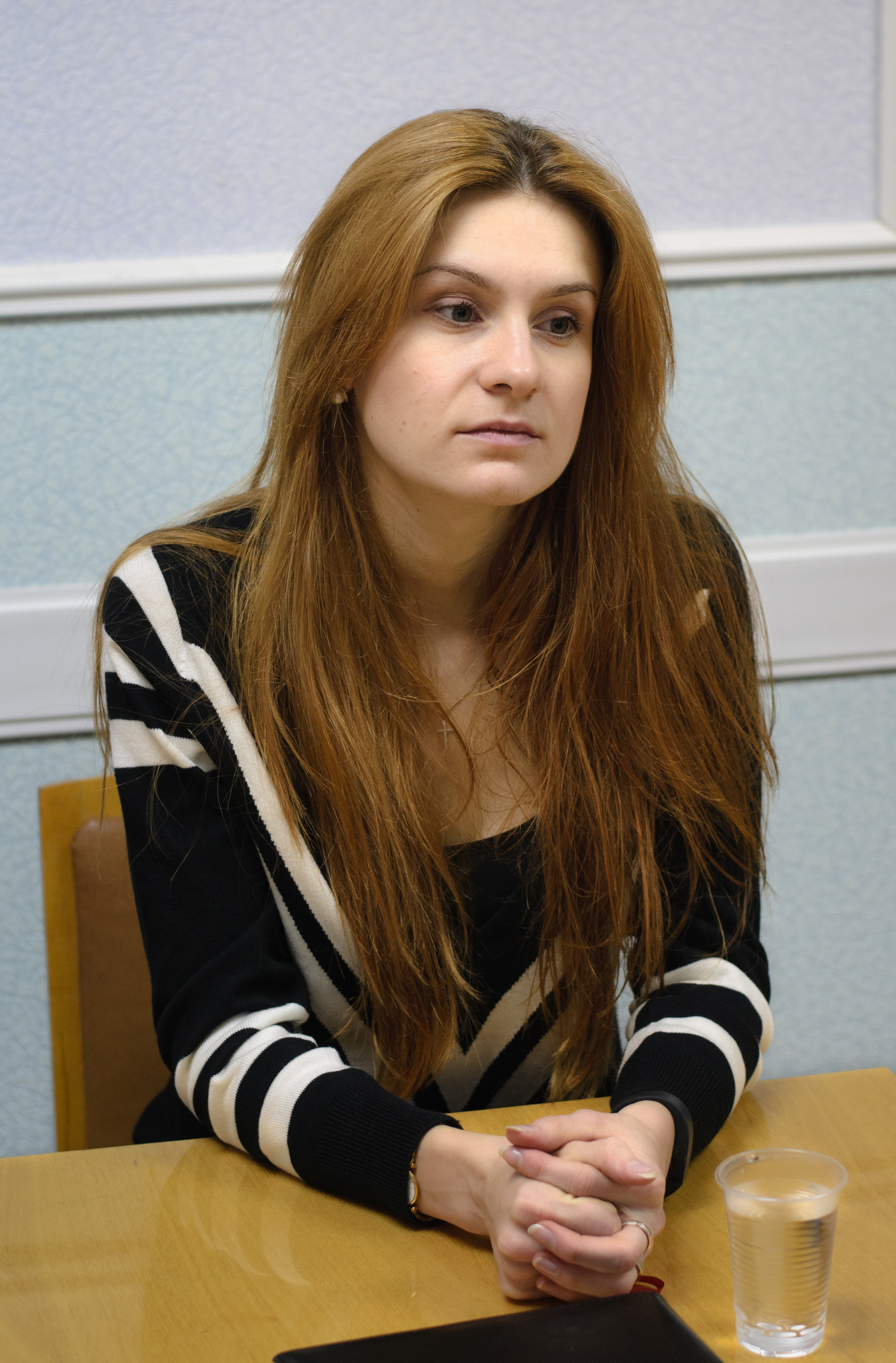
Butina in 2014

Butina and Torshin attended the 2014 NRA annual meeting as special guests of former NRA president Keene. Butina attended the Women's Leadership Luncheon at the 2014 meeting as a guest of former NRA president Sandy Froman. Butina presented to then NRA president Jim Porter a plaque from Right to Bear Arms. Afterwards, she tweeted "Mission accomplished". Butina and Torshin also attended the 2015 NRA annual convention.

In 2015, a number of NRA officials attended Right to Bear Arms's annual gun conference in Russia. Among them were Keene, gun manufacturer and NRA first vice president Pete Brownell, conservative American political operative Paul Erickson, and Milwaukee County sheriff David Clarke. One of their hosts was Russian Deputy Prime Minister Dmitry Rogozin, who in 2014 was sanctioned by the White House following Russia's annexation of Crimea. Clarke's trip cost $40,000, with all expenses paid by the NRA, Pete Brownell (an NRA board member and CEO of a gun-parts supply company) and Right to Bear Arms. According to a disclosure Clarke filed, Right to Bear Arms paid $6,000 to cover his meals, lodging, transportation and other expenses. During the meeting, Clarke met the Russian foreign minister and attended a conference at which Torshin spoke. In November 2016, Torshin tweeted that he and Butina were lifetime NRA members.

=== Republican Party ===
Butina has attempted to develop ties to conservative American politics. In a supporting affidavit to the government's support for pre-trial detention following her indictment in United States of America v. Maria Butina, the FBI stated that she had successfully sought ties to the Republican Party, where it is referred to as "POLITICAL PARTY 1". According to The Daily Beast, she has presented herself as a "Russian central bank staffer, a leading gun rights advocate, a 'representative of the Russian Federation,' a Washington, D.C. graduate student, a journalist, and a connection between Team Trump and Russia" in order to gain access to "high-level contacts" in Washington. At the 2014 NRA annual meeting, Butina took pictures with Louisiana Governor Bobby Jindal and former U.S. Senator and 2012 presidential candidate Rick Santorum.

=== Obama administration officials ===
In 2015, Torshin, then the Russian Central Bank deputy governor, and Butina met the Treasury undersecretary for international affairs, Nathan Sheets, to discuss U.S.-Russian economic relations. Separately, they also met with a Federal Reserve vice chairman, Stanley Fischer, and with a State Department official.

=== Donald Trump campaign ===
In a June 2015 article published in The National Interest, a conservative American international affairs magazine, just before Trump announced his candidacy for president, she urged better relations between the United States and Russia, saying, "It may take the election of a Republican to the White House in 2016 to improve relations between the Russian Federation and the United States." The next month, Butina attended FreedomFest, where Trump gave a speech, and asked him from the audience about ending U.S. sanctions against Russia, to which he replied, "I don't think you'd need the sanctions." Butina hosted a birthday party attended by Erickson and Trump campaign aides shortly after the 2016 election. (Note: Allegedly, during a birthday party on 12 November 2016, Butina claimed that she participated in communications between the Trump campaign and Russia during the 2016 United States presidential campaign and that she was responsible for Russia relations for the Trump campaign.)

== Relationships with Trump associates ==
Butina was in a relationship with Overstock.com CEO and Trump conspiracy theorist Patrick M. Byrne. Byrne claimed the FBI encouraged him to pursue Butina, a claim retired FBI officials denied. In 2019, Byrne divested himself of all shares of Overstock after his relationship with Butina was revealed.

For five years, prosecutors claimed, Butina lived with and maintained an intimate relationship with activist and fraudster Paul Erickson. During Donald Trump's presidential campaign in 2016, Erickson attempted to develop a back-channel between the NRA and the Russian government. Erickson was jailed and convicted of fraud unrelated to his relationship with Butina, then pardoned by Trump in the last week of his first term in office.

== United States of America v. Mariia Butina, aka Maria Butina ==
=== Complaint ===
United States of America v. Mariia Butina, aka Maria Butina
- Court: U.S. District Court for the District of Columbia
- Defendant: Mariia Butina
- Prosecution: Erik M. Kenerson
- Citation: 18 U.S.C. § 951.

Court membership
- Judge sitting: Deborah A. Robinson

On 15 July 2018, Butina was arrested in Washington, D.C., and charged with acting in the United States as an agent of a foreign government; specifically the Russian Federation, without prior notification to the Attorney General, a conspiracy to commit an offense against the United States, to wit, 18 U.S.C. §951 (foreign relations, agents of foreign governments), in violation of 18 U.S.C. §371 (conspiracy).

After her arrest, it was mistakenly reported she was charged with a violation of the Foreign Agents Registration Act (22 U.S.C. §11 foreign agents and propaganda). United States law dictates that all lobbyists representing foreign governments must register as such with the Department of Justice. Her attorney said that "the allegations of the indictment are essentially that her only illegal act was not registering."

On 18 July, Butina pleaded not guilty, and a District Court judge ordered her jailed pending trial. She was also said to be cooperating in a federal fraud investigation in South Dakota. Butina was held in solitary confinement in Alexandria Detention Center.

=== Affidavit ===
According to the affidavit in support of the complaint, from as early as 2015 and continuing through at least February 2017, Butina worked at the direction of a high-level official in the Russian government, who, according to The New York Times, was believed to be Torshin. The court filings detail the Russian official's and Butina's efforts for Butina to act as an agent of Russia inside the United States by developing relationships with U.S. persons and infiltrating organizations having influence in the Republican Party and in conservative politics—such as the National Rifle Association, the National Prayer Breakfast and some religious organizations—for the purpose of advancing the interests of the Russian Federation.

The filings also describe certain actions taken by Butina to further this effort during multiple visits from Russia and, later, when she entered and resided in the United States on a student visa. The filings allege that she undertook her activities "without officially disclosing the fact that she was acting as an agent of Russian government, as required by law."

Butina, Torshin, and Erickson have been subjects of an investigation by the United States Senate Select Committee on Intelligence into Russian interference in the 2016 United States elections. Erickson is referred to in Butina's indictment as "Person 1." In addition, George D. O'Neill Jr., a conservative writer and Rockefeller heir, is "Person 2." Torshin has also been the subject of a probe by the FBI into whether the Russian government attempted to illegally funnel money to the NRA in order to help Trump win the presidency.

The FBI began to monitor Butina in August 2016, after she had moved to the United States on an F-1 student visa. Rather than confront her immediately, the FBI chose to track her movements and gather information on whom she was meeting, and what her end goals were to be.

=== Plea deal ===
Butina's attorneys and federal prosecutors declared in a 16 November 2018, court filing that they had entered into plea negotiations. On 13 December, she pleaded guilty to conspiracy to act as an illegal foreign agent, while the original charge of failing to register as a foreign agent was dropped. She faced a maximum sentence of five years in prison and, according to a CNN report, will "likely be deported after serving any time."

On 26 April 2019, Butina was sentenced to 18 months in prison by Judge Tanya S. Chutkan, in accordance with the recommendations of prosecutors. Butina was released from prison on 25 October and deported back to Russia.

Butina later complained that in the U.S., she was forced to sign a plea-deal. She claimed that she was sentenced for simply being Russian.

=== Russian reaction ===
Russian President Vladimir Putin said he had no prior knowledge of Butina. Russian foreign minister Sergey Lavrov made a statement saying that Butina's arrest was designed to undermine the "positive results" of the Helsinki summit between U.S. President Trump and Russian President Putin. She was arrested a day before Trump met his Russian counterpart. Butina's father has called the accusations against her "a witch-hunt".

Leonid Slutsky, head of the lower house of the Russian parliament's foreign affairs committee, called Butina's case a "modern political inquisition." Russia's Foreign Ministry accused the United States of forcing false confession from Butina. According to the foreign ministry spokesperson, Maria Zakharova, "having created unbearable conditions for her and threatening her with a long jail sentence, she was literally forced to sign up to absolutely ridiculous charges."

== Timeline ==
=== 2011 ===
- Unspecified: Butina founds the "Right to Bear Arms" organization.
- 29 April – 1 May: Nashville lawyer G. Kline Preston IV introduces Russian Senator Aleksandr Torshin to National Rifle Association (NRA) president David Keene at the NRA annual meeting in Pittsburgh. A witness claims financial support for Torshin by the NRA was discussed.
- 7 May: Keene sends Torshin a handwritten letter offering to help in his endeavors.

=== 2012 ===
- 12–15 April: Torshin attends the NRA annual convention in St. Louis, Missouri, with an "all access" pass.
- 8 November: Torshin visits the NRA headquarters in Fair Oaks, Virginia.

=== 2013 ===
- 3–5 May: Butina and Torshin attend the NRA convention in Houston, Texas.
- Early October: Butina makes a presentation on "Right to Bear Arms" to the Association for the Promotion of Weapons Culture in Israel. Her presentation includes a slide claiming her organization has cooperation agreements with similar organizations in Kazakhstan, Ukraine, and Estonia, and she informs the group that it also has a cooperation agreement with the NRA. Another slide states it has a cooperation agreement with the International Defensive Pistol Association, which the Texas-based organization denies when asked in 2018.
- Early November: Keene, Alan Gottlieb, Gottlieb's wife, and Paul Erickson attend the "Right to Bear Arms" conference in Moscow where they meet with Butina and Torshin. Gottlieb and Keene are invited speakers at the event. Gottlieb and his wife dine with Torshin and Butina, and receive "gifts that [display] research into their interests." In 2017, Gottlieb tells the Washington Post, "They wanted to keep communications open and form friendships."
- 10 December: John Bolton promotes gun rights in Russia in a video made for Butina's "Right to Bear Arms" organization.

=== 2014 ===
- Unspecified: Butina tells an American Facebook friend who complained about California's gun restrictions that he should "hold demonstrations" for gun rights.
- 24 April: Butina presents NRA president Jim Porter with an honorary membership in "Right to Bear Arms".
- 25–27 April: Butina and Torshin attend the NRA annual conference in Indianapolis. Butina attends several meetings as a guest of Keene.
- 3 September: Paul Erickson attends a "Right to Bear Arms" forum in Moscow where he is a featured speaker.
- Late 2014: Butina resigns from her position as the head of "Right to Bear Arms".

=== 2015 ===
- February: Dimitri Simes meets with Putin and other Russian officials in Moscow. Simes is the publisher of The National Interest and CEO of the think tank Center for the National Interest (CNI). The Center arranges meetings between Torshin, Butina, and U.S. government officials in April. The following year he would arrange Trump's 27 April 2016, speech at the Mayflower Hotel.
- 26–28 February: Butina attends CPAC.
  - Butina and Torshin meet with Treasury undersecretary for international affairs Nathan Sheets to discuss U.S. Russian economic relations during the Obama administration. The meeting was arranged by the CNI.
  - Torshin and Butina participate in discussions about the "Russian financial situation and its impact on Russian politics" at a private event moderated by Hank Greenberg and organized by the CNI.
- 7 April: Torshin and Butina meet with Federal Reserve vice chairman Stanley Fischer to discuss U.S. Russian economic relations during the Obama administration. The meeting was arranged by the CNI.
- 10 April: Butina, Torshin, and David Keene attend a fundraiser in Tennessee for Wisconsin Governor Scott Walker.
- 11–12 April: Torshin and Butina attend the NRA convention in Nashville, Tennessee. Torshin briefly converses with Trump. Torshin and the Trump family dispute how much was said.
- 12 June: Maria Butina argues in an article she wrote for The National Interest that only a Republican president can improve relations between the U.S. and Russia.
- 11 July: Butina attends FreedomFest in Las Vegas, where Trump is speaking and taking questions. She asks Trump his stance on continuing sanctions; he replies he knows Putin and doesn't think sanctions are needed. Reviewing a video of the encounter, Bannon points out that "Trump had a fully developed answer".
- 13 July: Butina is present at Wisconsin Governor Scott Walker's presidential candidacy announcement.
- 4–6 August: Rohrabacher and Behrends travel to Russia. While there, Rohrabacher meets Butina and Torshin for breakfast. In July 2018, Rohrabacher tells Politico he dined with Butina and another congressman accompanying him on the trip.
- 25 November: In an email to incoming NRA President Pete Brownell, Erickson writes, "most of the FSB agents 'assigned' to her [Butina] want to marry her", saying that is why she was able to arrange a tour of a Russian arms factory for the NRA delegation.
- 8–13 December: Outspoken Trump supporter Milwaukee Sheriff David Clarke, former NRA President David Keene, future NRA President Pete Brownell, NRA Golden Ring of Freedom Chair Joe Gregory, major NRA donors Hilary and Arnold Goldschlager, Outdoor Channel CEO Jim Liberatore, and NRA member Paul Erickson travel to Moscow for the "Right to Bear Arms" convention. They meet Russian government officials, including Deputy Prime Minister of Russia Dmitry Rogozin and Foreign Minister Sergey Lavrov. Rogozin is under U.S. sanctions. Butina accompanies the delegation on a tour of the gun manufacturer ORSIS, where they meet with the company's executives, including Svetlana Nikolaev, president of ORSIS's parent company and wife of billionaire Konstantin Nikolaev. They also meet with Torshin and Sergei Rudov, the head of the Saint Basil the Great Charitable Foundation. They attend a party at a Moscow hunting club hosted by Torshin and Pavel Gusev, the Chairman of the Public Council of the Russian Ministry of Defense. Clarke later files an ethics report showing that Butina's organization, "Right to Bear Arms", covered $6,000 of his expenses. After the Lavrov meeting, Butina emails Torshin, writing, "We should let them express their gratitude now, and put pressure on them quietly later." In May 2018, NRA spokeswoman Dana Loesch denies there was an NRA trip to Moscow, then clarifies in July 2018 that it wasn't an official trip.

=== 2016 ===
- 27 April:
  - Erickson contacts Trump campaign advisor Rick Dearborn. In an email headed "Kremlin Connection", Erickson seeks the advice of Dearborn and Sessions about how to arrange a meeting between Trump and Putin. Erickson suggests making contact at the NRA's annual convention in Kentucky. The communication refers to Torshin, who is under instructions to contact the Trump campaign.
  - At Butina's urging, Christian activist Rick Clay emails Dearborn with the subject "Russian backdoor overture and dinner invite" offering a meeting between Trump and Torshin. Dearborn, then Sessions's Chief of Staff, sends an email mentioning a person from West Virginia seeking to connect Trump campaign members with Putin. Dearborn appears "skeptical" of the meeting request. Jared Kushner rejects the request. Torshin and Trump Jr. later meet and speak at the NRA convention.
- 10 May: Dearborn receives an email about arranging a back-channel meeting between Trump and Putin with the subject line "Kremlin Connection." It is sent from a conservative operative who says Russia wants to use the NRA's convention to make "first contact."
- 16 May: Dearborn receives a similar second proposal, which he forwards to Kushner, Manafort and Rick Gates. Both efforts appear to involve Torshin, who was instructed to make contact with the Trump campaign. Kushner rebuffs the proposal.
- 19–22 May: The NRA annual conference is held in Louisville, Kentucky. Trump and Trump Jr. attend. Trump Jr. meets briefly with Torshin and Butina on 20 May.
- August: Butina arrives in the U.S. on a student visa to attend American University in Washington, D.C.
- 9 August: Bloomberg reports that the Spanish Civil Guard believes Torshin assisted the Taganskaya crime syndicate with money laundering through banks in Spain.
- 29 September: Facilitated by Faith Whittlesey, Butina is introduced by Paul Erickson to J. D. Gordon at a party at the Swiss ambassador's residence. Gordon was the Director of National Security for the Trump campaign from February to August. That night, Erickson emails Butina and Gordon offering to "add an electronic bridge" to their meeting at the party. In his email to Butina, Erickson writes that Gordon is "playing a crucial role in the Trump transition effort and would be an excellent addition to any of the U.S./Russia friendship dinners to occasionally hold." He writes that all the "right" people listen to Gordon on international security. Erickson's email to Gordon describes Butina as a "special friend" of the NRA and the special assistant to the deputy governor of the Bank of Russia.
- October: Whittlesey and Butina attend Gordon's birthday party.
- 18 October: Butina and Gordon attend a Styx concert together.
- 12 November : Butina holds a birthday party at Cafe Deluxe in Washington, D.C., attended by Erickson and Trump campaign aides. She claims to be part of Russian communications with the Trump campaign, something she has bragged about for months.

=== 2017 ===
- 20 January: Maria Butina attends the inaugural Freedom Ball with Paul Erickson. It is one of the three balls Trump attends.
- 27 January: Alexander Torshin, Maria Butina, Paul Erickson, and former Kremlin staffer Andrey Kolyadin dine with Representatives Dana Rohrabacher and Thomas Massie at a private dinner hosted by Rockefeller heir George O'Neill Jr.
- 2 February: Alexander Torshin and Maria Butina attend the National Prayer Breakfast. Torshin is scheduled to meet privately with Trump beforehand, but the meeting is canceled after a national security aide points out that Torshin is under investigation for organized crime and money laundering. A spokesman for Torshin later says Torshin was officially on vacation at the time, adding, "President Trump has never proposed a meeting to Mr. Torshin."
- 11 August: The Senate Intelligence Committee asks Sigal Mandelker, the Under Secretary of the Treasury for Terrorism and Financial Intelligence, to provide any "suspicious" or "derogatory" transaction records reported by banks involving Maria Butina, Alexander Torshin, Paul Erickson, Investing With Dignity, or Bridges LLC. Erickson owns Investing With Dignity and jointly owns Bridges LLC with Butina. The committee sends a follow-up request on 7 December complaining that it hasn't received a response.
- December: Butina declines a request to testify before the Senate Judiciary Committee because of lack of support from Republican members.

=== 2018 ===
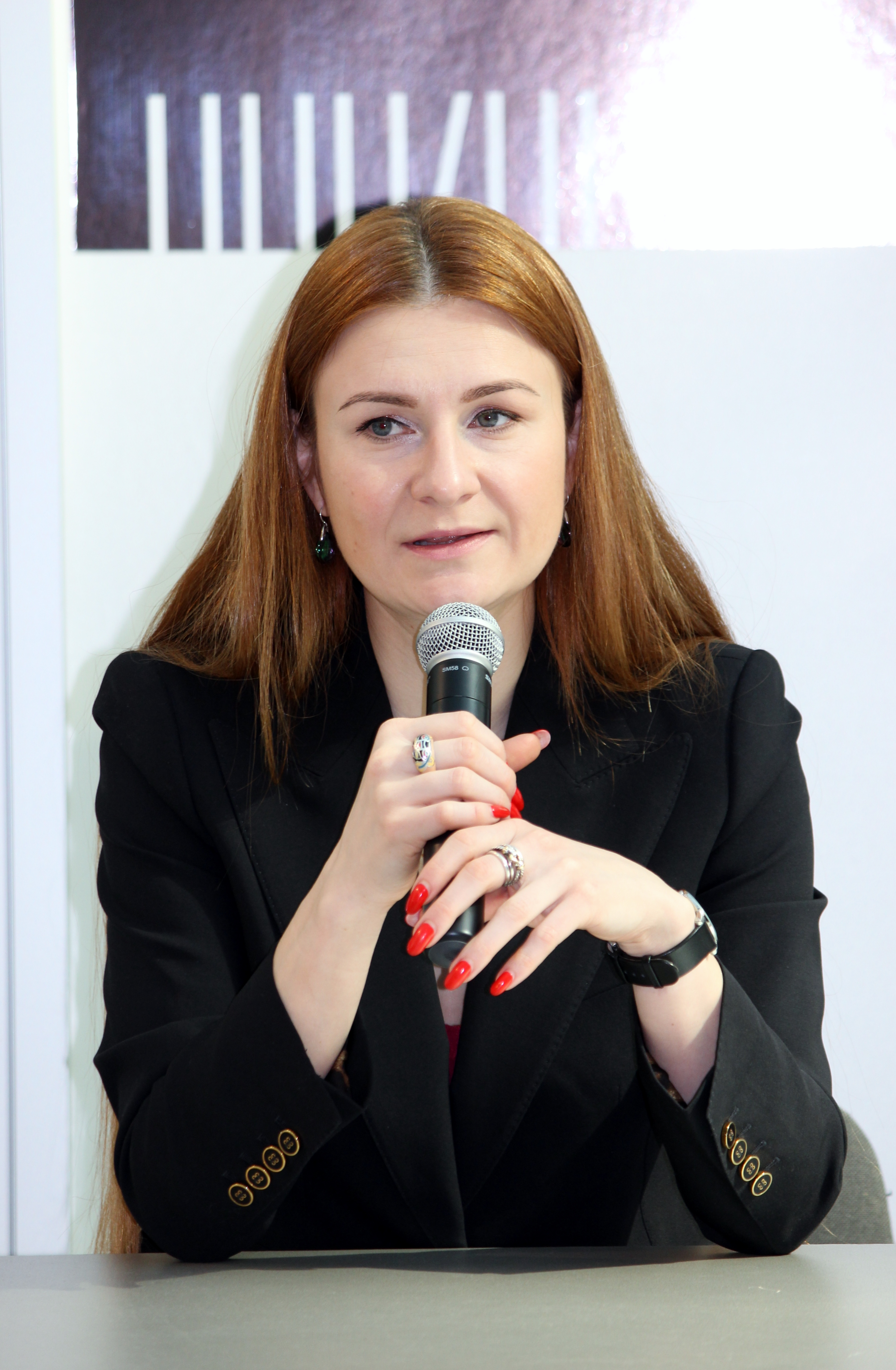
Butina presents her Prison diary at the 22 Moscow International Fair Non/fiction (March 2021)

- January: Federal agents photograph Maria Butina dining with Oleg Zhiganov, the director of the Russian Cultural Center. Zhiganov is expelled from the U.S. in March for being a suspected Russian spy. In a July hearing, prosecutors offer Butina's association with Zhiganov as one reason she should be considered a flight risk and denied bail.
- 12 March: Butina responds to a Federal Election Commission query "about whether or not certain donations had been made to political campaigns."
- April: Butina testifies before the Senate Intelligence Committee in a closed session for eight hours. She tells the committee that Russian billionaire Konstantin Nikolaev funded "Right to Bear Arms" from 2012 to 2014. In July, A spokesperson for Nikolaev confirms the funding support after initial denials.
- 25 April: FBI agents in tactical gear search Butina's apartment. One of the warrants executed is related to a fraud investigation of Paul Erickson.
- May: Butina graduates from American University with a master's degree in international relations.
- 7 May: The NRA announces board member Oliver North will replace Peter Brownell as president of the organization after Brownell announces he will not seek a second term. The selection of North is unusual because the NRA board normally selects someone who has served two terms each as the first and the second vice president, and North has held neither position. In August, David Corn of Mother Jones points out that the move comes two weeks after the FBI raided Butina's apartment and that Brownell is an associate of Butina.
- June: Butina offers to assist prosecutors in an investigation of Paul Erickson.
- 15 July: Butina is arrested in Washington, D.C., on charges of being an unregistered foreign agent of the Russian Federation working to infiltrate politically influential organizations in the U.S. and influence U.S. officials.
- 16 July: The Justice Department announces Butina's arrest and the criminal charges that led to it. NRA spokeswoman Dana Loesch clarifies her 8 May denial of the December 2015 NRA trip to Moscow, telling Mark Follman of Mother Jones that she meant it wasn't an official trip.
- 17 July: Prosecutors file an indictment of Butina in the U.S. District Court for the District of Columbia.
  - Rohrabacher tells Politico he is unsure whether he is the U.S. congressman mentioned in the Butina indictment, though he admits to being in Russia in August 2015 and dining with Butina and another congressman. He calls the charges against Butina "bogus" and a function of the "deep state."
- 18 July: Butina pleads not guilty at a preliminary hearing. The judge orders Butina be held without bail pending trial.
- 19 July: The Russian Foreign Ministry calls on people to show their support for Butina by changing their social media avatars to a photo of her, in 'Free Maria Butina' campaign.
- 23 July: Senators Ron Wyden, Robert Menendez, and Sheldon Whitehouse send Treasury Secretary Steven Mnuchin a letter demanding the "production of any documents relevant to financial links between the NRA, its associated entities and Ms. Butina and any entities or individuals related to her." The letter is a follow-up to a similar letter Wyden sent Mnuchin in February.
- 23 July: After initial denials, a spokesperson for Russian billionaire Konstantin Nikolaev confirms that Nikolaev funded "Right to Bear Arms" from 2012 to 2014.
- 9 August: The Daily Beast reports that Igor Pisarky, the founder and chairman of the Russian public relations firm R.I.M. Porter Novelli, was Butina's point of contact for the funding she received from billionaire Konstantin Nikolaev.
- September: The U.S. Attorney's office in Washington, D.C., sends Paul Erickson a letter informing him that it is considering bringing charges against him for secretly acting as a foreign agent and a possible additional charge for conspiracy. The Daily Beast reports that Erickson is under investigation by the FBI and the U.S. attorney in South Dakota for fraudulently seeking $100,000 investments at conservative political events to fund North Dakota companies allegedly involved in the Bakken oil fields.
- 19 September: NPR reports that beginning in 2014, Maria Butina urged Americans to hold gun rights demonstrations.
- 11 December: CNN reports that Butina agreed to plead guilty to spying and is now cooperating with the prosecutor.
- 12 December: Reuters reports that Putin is unclear about why Butina was arrested. He said, "She risks 15 years in jail. For what? I asked all the heads of our intelligence services what is going on. Nobody knows anything about her."
- 13 December: Butina pleads guilty in a D.C. federal court to trying to infiltrate the U.S. conservative movement as an agent for the Kremlin. She admits to working with Erickson to forge bonds with NRA officials and conservative leaders while under the direction of Torshin. In her plea agreement, prosecutors agreed to drop a charge of failing to register as a foreign agent in exchange for cooperation. In the statement of the offense, Erickson is identified as "U.S. Person 1", Torshin as the "Russian Official", the Republican Party as "Political Party #1", and the NRA as the "Gun Rights Organization".
- 19 December: In a Moscow news briefing, Russian foreign ministry spokeswoman Maria Zakharova says that Butina was coerced into making a false confession: "Butina confirmed that she had done a deal with U.S. investigators and confessed to being a foreign agent. Having created unbearable conditions for her and threatening her with a long jail sentence, she was literally forced to sign up to absolutely ridiculous charges."

=== 2019 ===
- 27 September: U.S. Senate report is released which considers the NRA acted as a 'foreign asset' to Russia ahead of 2016 election.
- 25 October: Butina is released from Tallahassee Federal Correctional Institution, and is deported to Moscow.
- 17 December: Butina got a job on the RT channel as the host of the "Beautiful Russia boo-boo-boo" YouTube channel.

== Life after prison ==
In 2021, she visited Alexei Navalny, who was on a hunger strike in prison, stating that the conditions in the prison are better than in hotels in the Altai Territory, and Navalny himself is eating candy, not starving.

In the September 2021 Russian legislative election Butina ran for the 8th State Duma on the party list of United Russia. Based on the allocation of seats to parties, she initially did not receive a deputy mandate. However, Igor Vasilyev, then governor of Kirov Oblast, declined his seat in the Duma, which then passed to Butina. As a deputy, she sits on the Committee on International Affairs as well as the Commission on Investigation of Foreign Interference in Domestic Affairs of Russia.

=== Response to invasion of Ukraine ===
She expressed support for the Russian invasion of Ukraine, sharing a video on social media displaying the Z symbol on her jacket. She had previously made an appearance the day after the beginning of the invasion on state-controlled TV talk show Time Will Tell condemning the Ukrainian government for arming civilians to repel Russian assaults on cities. In a HARDtalk interview in March, she refused to give credibility to any non-Russian source.

== Sanctions ==
Butina is one of the members of the State Duma the United States Treasury sanctioned on 24 March 2022 in response to the Russian invasion of Ukraine.

She was also sanctioned by Canada under the Special Economic Measures Act (S.C. 1992, c. 17) in relation to the Russian invasion of Ukraine for Grave Breach of International Peace and Security, and by the UK government in 2022 in relation to the Russo-Ukrainian War.

== See also ==
- Anna Chapman
- Patrick M. Byrne
- Criminal charges brought in the Mueller special counsel investigation
- Lobbying in the United States
