= Ron Emerson =

British businessman

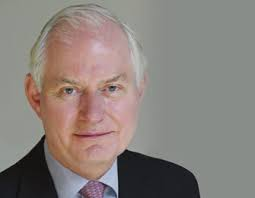
Ron Emerson

Ronald Victor Emerson is a British businessman who was the founding Chairman of the British Business Bank from 2013 to 2016.

He was educated at West Hartlepool Grammar School, the University of Manchester (BSc Engineering), Durham University (MSc), and University of Oxford, (MLitt, MA). He was an Associate Fellow at The Said Business School, University of Oxford for twenty years and Governing Body Fellow, and Chair of the Investment and Finance Committee at Green Templeton College, University of Oxford.

He was Global Head of Wholesale banking at Standard Chartered Bank, following which he was appointed as a Senior Advisor to both the Bank of England and Financial Services Authority from 1997 to 2000, and Chairman of Fairfield Energy from 2010 to 2016. He is a former chairman of Amsterdam Trade Bank, and was Chairman of Bank North.

He was made a Commander of the Order of the British Empire (CBE) in the 2017 New Year Honours for services to international banking and the financing of small and mid sized businesses.
