= Paul Erickson (activist) =

American political operative (born 1962)

- Born: 1962 (age 63–64)
- Education: University of Virginia School of Law; Yale College
- Occupations: Conservative political operative; lawyer; businessperson

Paul Erickson (born 1962) is an American conservative political operative, lawyer, and businessperson. He has been involved in several Republican presidential campaigns. He has strong ties to the National Rifle Association and Russian interests and in 2017 was subject to federal investigation into Russian interference in the 2016 United States elections. In November 2019, Erickson pleaded guilty to federal charges of wire fraud and money laundering in connection with an effort to defraud investors in an oil development scheme. He was sentenced to seven years in federal prison in July 2020, but was granted a full pardon on January 19, 2021, Donald Trump's last full day in office as president of the United States.

Full and Unconditional Pardon signed by Donald Trump on 13 January 2021

== Education ==
Erickson's hometown is Vermillion, South Dakota. He attended the University of South Dakota and then transferred to Yale University, where he graduated with a bachelor's degree in economics and political science in 1984. In 1980, while at USD, Erickson coordinated a youth campaign for Representative Jim Abdnor. For a year between his time at USD and Yale, Erickson served as the national treasurer of the College Republicans in Washington, D.C., whose staff at the time included Grover Norquist, Ralph Reed, and Jack Abramoff. Abramoff later wrote, "To every college Republican who contacted the national office, Paul Erickson was by far the most impressive person they had ever encountered in politics."

Also while in college, Erickson wrote "Fritzbusters", a comedy routine that was critical of Democratic presidential nominee Walter Mondale which had similarities to the then newly released film Ghostbusters (1984). Erickson and some fellow College Republicans performed Fritzbusters at the 1984 Republican National Convention and later as a warm-up act for Ronald Reagan at some rallies during the 1984 United States presidential election. The campaign stopped running Fritzbusters after more than 100 students wearing Fritzbusters shirts heckled Mondale in September 1984. Erickson earned a Juris Doctor degree from the University of Virginia School of Law in 1988.

== Political consulting ==
In addition to his political work while in college, Erickson worked in 1985 as the deputy campaign manager for Richard Viguerie’s unsuccessful campaign for Lieutenant Governor of Virginia.

Frustrated by the tax increase led by President George H. W. Bush, Erickson served as the national political director / campaign manager for the 1992 presidential campaign of Pat Buchanan. A biographer of Buchanan later said Erickson was "the best there was at the price Pat could afford."

Erickson later served as an advisor to Mitt Romney for both of his presidential campaigns. He is also a former board member of the American Conservative Union, the group that organizes the Conservative Political Action Conference (CPAC). He was a friend of Andrew Breitbart.

Stephen Moore, founder of the right-leaning limited-government group Club for Growth often relies on what he calls Erickson's “clever and creative ideas.” However, Lee Schoenbeck, a former Republican Watertown Representative to the South Dakota House of Representatives, has called him "the single biggest phony I’ve ever met in South Dakota politics." Casey Phillips, a South Dakota Republican political consultant, has said of Erickson, "He likes to put people in touch with people. He’s a person that’s at the center of relationships all over the place."

== Business undertakings ==
Erickson worked as an executive producer of Red Scorpion (1988), an anticommunist action film produced by Jack Abramoff.

From 1993 to 1994, Erickson acted as a media adviser, agent, and lawyer for John Wayne Bobbitt, whose wife Lorena had cut off his penis with a kitchen knife. Erickson booked Bobbitt on an international "Love Hurts" tour during which Bobbitt made appearances on television shows such as The Howard Stern Show.

In 1994, Erickson obtained a $30,000 contract with Jack Abramoff to lobby for entrance into the United States by Mobutu Sese Seko, the military dictator of the Democratic Republic of the Congo who had been banned from the entering the United States due to the corrupt and dictatorial nature of his regime. Mobutu sought a visit to the United Nations to claim credit for this offer, but his visa request was ultimately denied due to his past human rights abuses.

=== Senior care and medical technologies ===
In 1997, Erickson founded Compass Care, a senior living company based in South Dakota dedicated to developing non-nursing home care options for seniors in the Midwest. This venture led to senior care consulting spinoffs, independent living communities and the licensing of medical technology. Erickson and his companies have amassed at least seven civil court judgments against them over the years. In two such cases, lawsuits by investors in Compass Care alleged that Erickson had predicted investment returns of 25–100% but that neither investor received any returns and that Erickson had reneged on his promises to refund the original investments. One investor won a judgment for $115,417 in 2003 while another obtained a judgment for $190,000 in 2008. Two of Erickson's lawyers withdrew from the second case, one after Erickson wrote him a bad check.

=== Prison sentence and pardon ===
On February 6, 2019, Erickson was indicted by a grand jury in the US District of South Dakota for wire fraud and money laundering in connection with his activities with Compass Care and for defrauding investors of Investing with Dignity, a start-up wheelchair development and manufacturing venture. He pleaded not guilty and was released on bond.

In November 2019, Erickson pleaded guilty to federal charges of wire fraud and money laundering in connection with an effort to defraud investors in an oil development scheme. He was sentenced to seven years in federal prison on July 6, 2020, and granted a full presidential pardon on January 19, 2021, Donald Trump's last full day in office as president of the United States.

== NRA and Donald Trump's 2016 presidential campaign ==
Erickson has strong ties to both the National Rifle Association and the Russian gun rights community. He has supported Maria Butina, a former assistant to Aleksandr Torshin and the founder of a Russian gun rights group called "The Right to Bear Arms". In 2016, Erickson and Butina set up a South Dakota business named "Bridges, LLC", which Erickson later said was created to provide financial assistance for Butina's graduate studies.

During Donald Trump's presidential campaign in 2016, Erickson attempted to develop a back-channel between the NRA and the Russian government. In May 2016, Erickson sent an e-mail with the subject line "Kremlin Connection" to Trump campaign adviser Rick Dearborn asking Dearborn and then-Senator Jeff Sessions for advice on setting up a meeting between Trump and Russian president Vladimir Putin at an annual NRA convention. After Trump won the presidential election in November 2016, Erickson said he was advising his transition team.

Erickson, Butina, and Torshin have been part of an investigation by the Senate Intelligence Committee into Russian interference in the 2016 United States elections. Torshin has also been the subject of a probe by the Federal Bureau of Investigation into whether the Russian government attempted to illegally funnel money to the NRA in order to help Trump win the presidency. In July 2018 Butina was arrested by the FBI and charged with conspiring to act as an unregistered agent of the Russian Federation. In Butina's indictment, federal prosecutors said an unnamed American political operative, later identified as Erickson, had worked with Butina to arrange introductions to influential people inside the U.S. and to advance Russian interests. Butina pleaded guilty in December 2018, saying that she had engaged in a conspiracy against the United States with Erickson and Torshin. Meanwhile Erickson was under investigation by federal law enforcement agencies for the same offense.

== Religious activities ==
Erickson served a term on the board of directors of the Institute for Lutheran Theology.

In 1997 Erickson helped to organize a religious revival service on the National Mall in Washington, D.C., sponsored by the Promise Keepers, an Evangelical Christian men's organization. Hundreds of thousands of men participated in the day-long service.

== Personal life ==
Erickson has homes in New York, Los Angeles, and Sioux Falls, South Dakota.

According to prosecutor charges against Butina, Erickson and Butina lived together. Butina's defense alleged a long time relationship with Erickson.

== See also ==
- Russian interference in the 2016 United States elections
