= James W. Porter II =

Gun rights advocate

President of the National Rifle Association of America
- In office 2013–2015
- Preceded by: David Keene
- Succeeded by: Allan D. Cors

Personal details
- Born: February 7, 1949 (age 77) Birmingham, Alabama, U.S.
- Education: University of Alabama; Cumberland School of Law
- Occupation: Attorney

James W. Porter II (born February 7, 1949) is an American lawyer who was president of the National Rifle Association of America from 2013 to 2015. Born in Birmingham in 1949, his father, Irvine Porter, has also served as NRA president, serving from 1959 to 1961. He is also a sixth-generation Alabama landowner and is a strong advocate for wildlife management and hunting.

In 2014 Maria Butina presented then-NRA president Porter with an honorary membership in "Right to Bear Arms".

== Controversial positions ==
Porter called President Obama a "fake president" and advocated that civilians should be trained in the use of military weapons for both international and domestic war. He refers to the American Civil War as the War of Northern Aggression.

National Rifle Association of America
Preceded by David Keene	President of the NRA; 2013–2015	Succeeded by Allan D. Cors
