= Amsterdam Trade Bank =

Dutch commercial bank

Amsterdam Trade Bank N.V. (ATB)
- Type: Subsidiary
- Industry: Financial services
- Founded: 1994
- Defunct: 2022
- Headquarters: Amsterdam, North Holland, Netherlands
- Key people: Ron Emerson (Chairman); Oren Bass (CEO)
- Revenue: ▲€103.1 million (2010)
- Operating income: ▲€32.8 million (2010)
- Net income: ▲€8.16 million (2010)
- Number of employees: 200 (2014)
- Website: www.amsterdamtradebank.com

Amsterdam Trade Bank (ATB) was a commercial bank registered in The Netherlands between 1994 and 2022. The bank focused on providing trade financing for companies wishing to do business in former Soviet states.

ATB was supervised by De Nederlandsche Bank.

== History ==
The company was founded in 1994 through Alexander Smolensky as Stolichny Bank International, a subsidiary of the Russian SBS-AGRO Bank (Russian: СБС-Агро) (Note: In 1996 after Stolichny Savings Bank (SBS) (Russian: Столичный банк сбережений, English Capital Savings Bank) bought the state-owned Agroprombank (Russian: Агропромбанк), SBS-AGRO was the new merger of the two banks.) to provide trade financing for companies wishing to do business in former Soviet Union. In addition to the Netherlands branch, Stolichny Bank International had other international branches in Kazakhstan and Macedonia. Following the 1998 Russian financial crisis, SBS-AGRO, which was Russia's largest private bank, went through restructuring.

In 2001 it became a subsidiary of Russian private investment consortium Alfa Group through ABH Holdings S.A. a limited liability company (Luxembourg) and its subsidiary ABH Financial Limited which partially controls Alfa-Bank's assets. (Note: In 2015, ABH Holdings had four subsidiaries: ABH Financial Limited, which partially controls assets and operates mainly through JSC Alfa-Bank; ABH Ukraine Limited; ABH Kazakhstan Limited; and ABH Belarus Limited.) Ukrainian-born Russian businessman Mikhail Fridman later stated that through Alfa-Bank he indirectly owned a minority stake in ATB.

Amsterdam Trade Bank N.V. opened an internet branch in the Netherlands, Germany and Austria in 2003, 2006 and 2011, respectively.

On 22 April 2022 the Amsterdam District Court declared the bankruptcy of Amsterdam Trade Bank N.V.

== Controversies ==
In 2004 and again in 2007, an ATB account of the offshore company Sevenkey Limited, which is owned by Olga Shuvalova (wife of Igor Shuvalov) and supported by the Alexander Mamut-founded ALM Consulting (Russian: «АЛМ-Консалтинг») law firm, was used to transfer large amounts in US dollars to Gallagher Holdings Limited, which is associated with Alisher Usmanov, and a bank account of the company Unicast Technologies Corporation, which is associated with Eugene Shvidler. Usmanov used the money from the 2004 transactions to purchase his stake in the Anglo-Dutch steel firm Corus Group.

In 2017 the international investigative journalist collaboration claimed ATB was involved in an infamous money laundering scheme, something the bank denied. Allegedly, $34.5 million moved through Amsterdam Trade Bank accounts. Paul Radu led the investigations, and ATB offices were searched by the Dutch financial crimes prosecutor (Dutch: Fiscale inlichtingen- en opsporingsdienst (FIOD)). The search did not result in proof of money laundering, although the bank had nonetheless placed a heavier emphasis on its compliance department following the events.

== Corporate governance ==
Acting directors of ATB in 2018 were:

- Harris Antoniou (CEO)
- Eric Steeghs (CFO)
- Peter Ullmann (CRO)

There were also a number of non-acting directors in supervisory board.

== See also ==
- List of banks in the Netherlands
