= David Keene =

American political consultant (1945–2026)

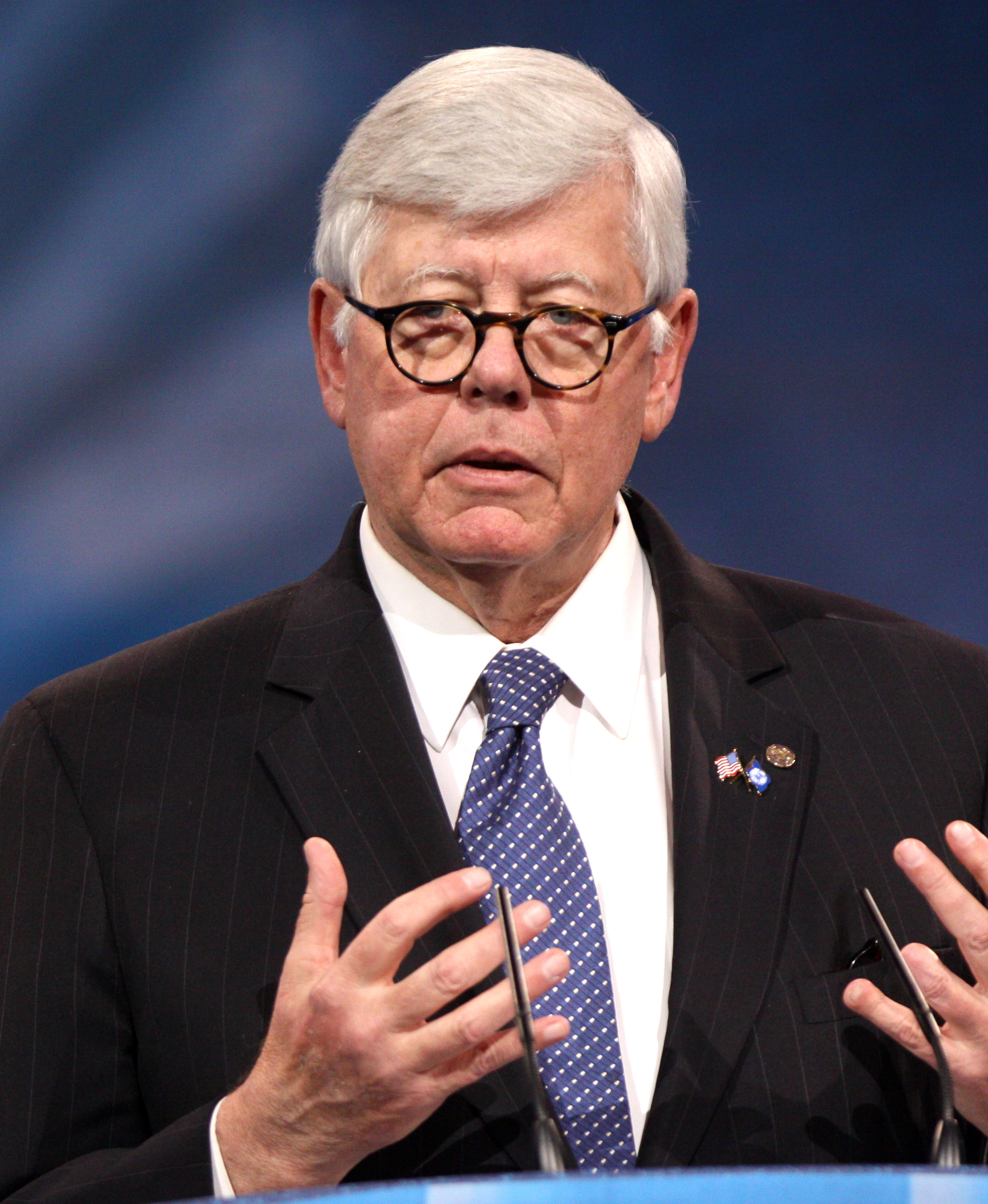
- Keene in 2013

Chair of the American Conservative Union
- In office 1984–2011
- Preceded by: Mickey Edwards
- Succeeded by: Al Cárdenas

President of the National Rifle Association
- In office 2011–2013
- Preceded by: Ron Schmeits
- Succeeded by: James W. Porter II

Personal details
- Born: David Arthur Keene; May 20, 1945 Rockford, Illinois, U.S.
- Died: March 8, 2026 (aged 80) Baltimore, Maryland, U.S.
- Party: Republican
- Spouse(s): Karlyn Herbolsheimer (divorced) Diana Hubbard (divorced) Donna Wiesner (m. 2004)
- Children: 5
- Education: University of Wisconsin–Madison (BA); University of Wisconsin Law School (JD)

David Arthur Keene (May 20, 1945 – March 8, 2026) was an American political consultant, presidential advisor and newspaper editor, as well as the Opinion Editor of The Washington Times. He was chair of the American Conservative Union from 1984 to 2011. Keene was the president of the National Rifle Association (NRA) for the traditional two one-year terms from 2011 to 2013.

== Early life and education ==
David Arthur Keene was born in Rockford, Illinois, on May 20, 1945. He was the middle of five sons of Dorothy Trenholm and Arthur W. Keene Jr., who was a union organizer. He was raised in Fort Atkinson, Wisconsin.

Keene was chapter leader and eventually national chairman of Young Americans for Freedom (YAF) while at the University of Wisconsin–Madison in the 1960s. He supported U.S. efforts to oppose communism and was against radicalism on both sides of the debate, particularly the violent efforts to suppress discourse. He majored in political science at the University of Wisconsin. He later graduated with a Juris Doctor degree from the University of Wisconsin Law School in 1970.

== Career ==
=== Politics ===
After graduating from college, he ran for the Wisconsin State Senate in 1969 at age 24 in a special election to replace Frank E. Panzer, who had died in office in August that year. Keene ran as a conservative and had Richard Nixon's endorsement, but was defeated by Democrat Dale McKenna in a race to fill the traditionally Republican 13th district senate seat. This was the only time that Keene ran for public office.

Keene later worked as a political assistant to Vice President Spiro Agnew during the Nixon administration, and then in the 1970s as executive assistant to Senator James L. Buckley.

Keene went on to become the southern regional coordinator for Ronald Reagan's 1976 bid for the Republican presidential nomination and national political director for George H. W. Bush's 1980 presidential campaign. He advised Senator Bob Dole's 1988 and 1996 presidential campaigns. In 2007 he endorsed Mitt Romney for president and was an advisor to his second run for president in 2012.

A campaign consultant or advisor to countless local and state campaigns, Politico's Andy Barr commented that at the peak of his power he had been "counted as one of the few men with both the ear of Republican presidents and an ability to influence the grassroots".

From 2006 to 2007, Keene represented the Nigerian and Algerian governments while working for Carmen Group, a Washington, D.C. lobbying firm.

=== Civil liberties ===
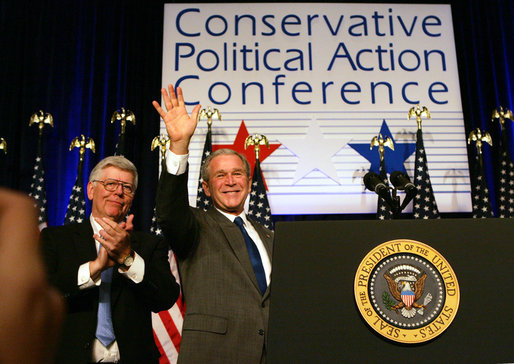
Keene with President George W. Bush at the 2008 CPAC

Keene was best known for his efforts on behalf of gun rights. He was appointed by the Bush White House to serve as public delegate to the United Nations Small Arms and Light Weapons Conference.

In 2007, Keene co-founded the American Freedom Agenda (AFA), which describes itself as "a coalition established to restore checks and balances and civil liberties protections under assault by the executive branch". He also co-chaired the Constitution Project's Liberty and Security Committee, and said, "The right to appeal one's detention to an independent judge is a cornerstone of responsible, conservative governance." He was critical of the Patriot Act, and worked with the American Civil Liberties Union to limit the effects of the act.

Keene was Chairman of the American Conservative Union. Instigated by problems his son David Michael Keene was having in filing complaints while serving a 10-year sentence for firearms offenses during a 2002 road rage incident, Keene also had an unlikely collaboration with the American Civil Liberties Union in a campaign to reform the Prison Litigation Reform Act. Keene was a founding member of Right On Crime, a conservative criminal justice reform group.

He co-chaired the Constitution Project's "Liberty & Security" initiative, which criticized the government security and surveillance measures in terms of their impact on individual privacy and constitutional rights in the aftermath of the September 11 attacks in 2001.

=== Other activities ===
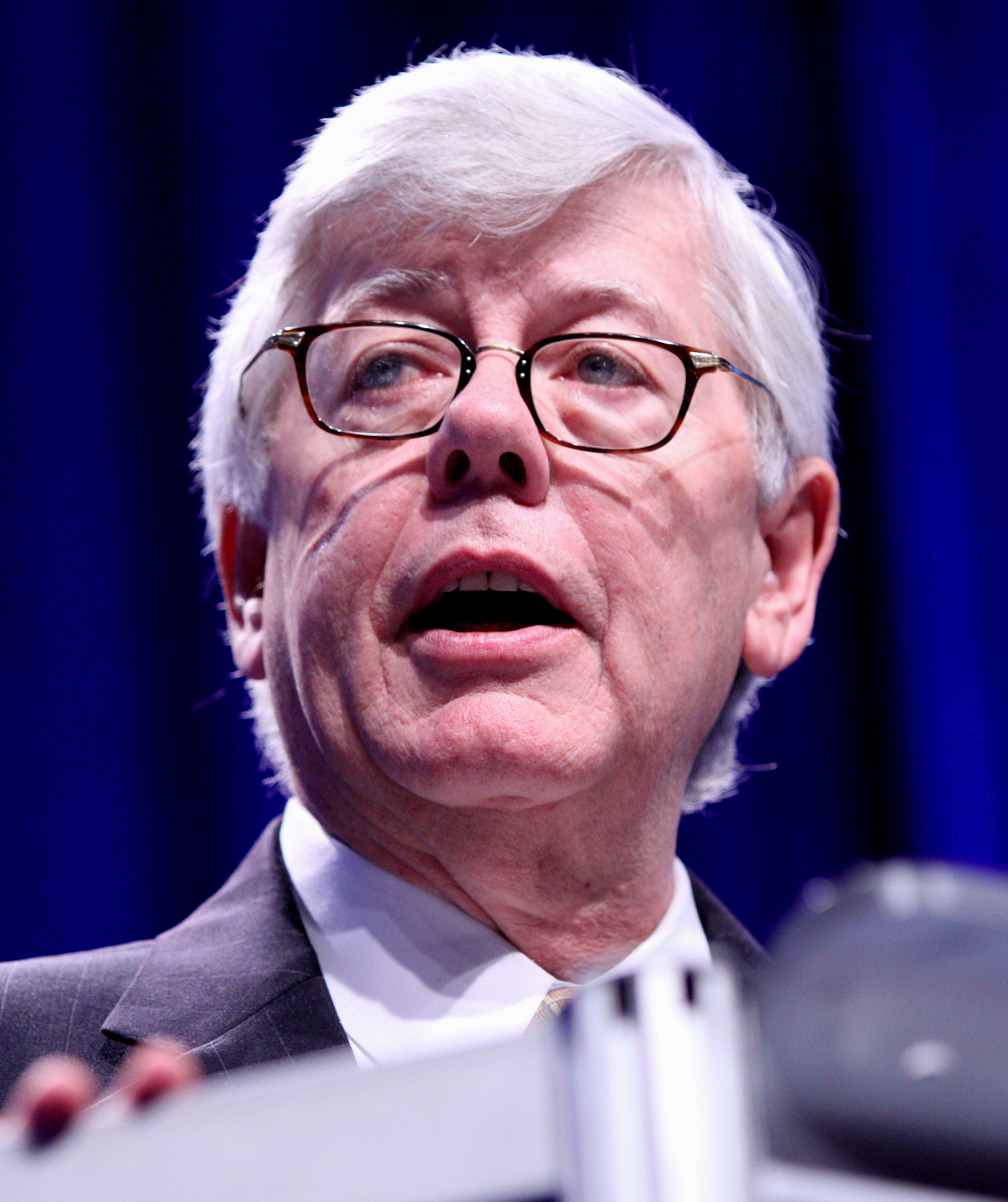
Keene in 2011

Keene's first book, Shall Not Be Infringed: The New Assaults on Your Second Amendment was published by Skyhorse Publishing in October 2016.

On March 25, 2017, Keene was a guest on Against the Current (ATC), a "content series devoted to in-depth topical conversations between [radio host] Dan Proft and distinguished guests that are masters in their field of study". ATC's parent organization Upstream Ideas wrote that Keene and Proft discussed "the fundamental problem of how to roll back the size and scope of government". They also talked about lessons that could be learned from the NRA as a successful political movement. Keene also offered his thoughts on media.

In June 2021, Keene was tricked into giving a high school graduation speech defending gun rights in front of 3,044 empty chairs—one for each student who might have graduated in 2021 had they not been a victim of gun violence. The stunt was organized by gun-safety group Change the Ref, which was founded by the parents of a student killed in the Parkland high school shooting in Florida. The group released a video of the stunt that went viral and ends by asking viewers to sign a petition pushing for universal background checks.

== Personal life and death ==
In 2004 Keene married Donna Wiesner Keene, Senior Fellow at the Independent Women's Forum and an appointee in the presidential administrations of Ronald Reagan, George H. W. Bush, and George W. Bush. Keene was previously married to Karlyn Herbolsheimer and Diana Hubbard, both marriages ended in divorce. With Hubbard, Keene had five children.

Keene died from pancreatic cancer in Baltimore, Maryland, on March 8, 2026, at the age of 80.

National Rifle Association of America
Preceded by Ron Schmeits	President of the NRA; 2011–2013	Succeeded by James W. Porter II
