= Education in Lincolnshire =

Education system in Lincolnshire

Lincolnshire is one of the few counties within the UK that still uses the eleven-plus to decide who may attend grammar school, in common with Buckinghamshire and Kent. As a result, many towns in Lincolnshire have both a grammar school and a secondary modern school.

Lincoln, however, is primarily non-selective, as is the area within a radius of about seven miles. In this area, most children attend comprehensive schools, though it is still possible to opt into the eleven-plus system. This gives rise to the unusual result that those who pass the eleven-plus can attend a grammar school outside the Lincoln comprehensive area, but those who do not pass still attend a (partly non-selective) comprehensive school.

== Grammar schools in Lincolnshire ==
Grammar schools in the county include:

- Queen Elizabeth's Grammar School, Alford is a 550-year-old selective academy located in the rural town of Alford. The school selects pupils based on their eleven-plus attainment and GCSE point score and was ranked "Good" on the latest Ofsted report. The school consistently achieves high GCSE and A level results and boasts the progress and achievement of its pupils.
- Caistor Grammar School is an endowed Foundation School, founded in 1630 by Francis Rawlinson. Caistor Grammar School is a Sports and Humanities College in the market town of Caistor. The Ofsted report in 2008 ranked Caistor Grammar School as "Outstanding" in all areas. The school has consistently been the highest at A-Level in Lincolnshire and is 34th in national Grammar School league tables.
- Skegness Grammar School was founded in 1483 by the notable Lord High Chancellor of England William de Waynflete. Skegness Grammar School was the first British secondary school to be awarded Grant Maintained status by the government in 1988. The school has been classed as a High Performing Specialist School, due to the progress the students have made over the five years of compulsory education in years seven to eleven. Formal evaluation of the recent Sixth Form results has shown that they have established and maintained excellent teaching standards that have led to equally high levels of progress. The school is proud that most of its students have chosen to stay at the school for the on site Sixth Form to complete their studies.
- King Edward VI Grammar School, Louth also uses the eleven-plus to select pupils. The school recently celebrated its 450th Charter Day in 2001 to mark the day, on 21 September 1551, when King Edward VI signed the charter to maintain the school's existence following the dissolution of the religious guilds and the monastery in the town. Former pupils of 'KEVIGS' include Captain John Smith founder of Virginia, Sir John Franklin and Alfred Lord Tennyson.
- Boston Grammar School is another ancient educational institution, having been founded by letters patent of Philip and Mary in 1555, but a school existed for centuries before that; in 1329 the Lincoln Cathedral Chapter "confered the School of St Botolph (Boston) on Robert of Muston". The school was used as the model for Boston Latin School which was the first school of the new colony in what became the United States of America. Boston Grammar School's current library, built in 1567, is believed to be the oldest academic building in continuous use in England.
- The King's School, Grantham traces its history back to 1329 when the first teacher was appointed. In 1528 the school was re-endowed by Bishop Richard Foxe of Winchester who also founded Corpus Christi College, Oxford. The school library, a grade I listed building, was the original School House. Among its many old boys are Lord Burghley, Chancellor to Queen Elizabeth I, and Sir Isaac Newton.
- Kesteven and Grantham Girls' School with specialist science status, opened in 1910 on the present extensive and attractive site overlooking the town of Grantham. The original, fine buildings have been refurbished and, together with new buildings, additions and modifications made over the years, provide excellent accommodation and facilities for today's students. Its most famous old girl is Margaret Thatcher, Britain's first woman prime minister.
- Queen Elizabeth's High School in Gainsborough was founded in 1589 and has been a co-ed school since 1983. It performs excellently in all academic areas as well as having strong sports, public speaking and general knowledge teams. The school also hosts successful music concerts and drama productions throughout the year. The school has maintained the handsome original buildings which add a sense of class when seen from the road. Among its most famous old boys are Sir Halford Mackinder, founder of the School of Geography at Oxford University, and John Robinson, chaplain to the Pilgrim Fathers and Reformed theologian.
- Queen Elizabeth's Grammar School, Horncastle, was royally chartered by Queen Elizabeth I in 1571 but there had been a formal school in Horncastle already for 250 years. The original Charter document, with its Royal Seal, remains in the safe custody of the school's governors. It is a selective, co-educational, foundation status Grammar School and Sixth Form College. The school also attained a dual specialist status as both a Science College and as a Mathematics and Computing College on a joint basis with Banovallum School, which is also in Horncastle. Exam results have remained constantly in the top 5% in the country since results tables have been published.
- Spalding High School was opened in 1920 at Ayscoughfee Hall before moving to its current site on Stonegate. It is an all-girls school that also accepts students from Peterborough as well as other parts of Cambridgeshire and Norfolk.

== Comprehensive and secondary modern schools ==
Despite the bias towards selection, there are non-selective schools in Lincolnshire with good (above average) results, and excellent results. The Priory (formerly the Lincoln School of Science and Technology) is well regarded and achieves results comparable with the selective schools. William Farr School at Welton recently topped the national list for 'A level' results and was described in a recent OFSTED report as "outstanding", achieving A level results well above most comprehensives, especially across the East Midlands. Another good comprehensive is The Deepings School in Market Deeping; the good comprehensives are generally in middle class areas. Amongst the secondary modern schools are some that achieve good results and OFSTED inspections. In the county are 63 state secondary schools and 8 private schools, not including sixth form colleges, although only the two independent schools in Stamford are typical of the 'public schools'. North East Lincolnshire has 12 state schools and one independent school, and North Lincolnshire has 14 state schools. In general, most school results in both these unitary authorities are low for GCSE and A-level, with the exception of the Franklin College in Grimsby.

Schools in Lincolnshire luckily rarely fall victim to arson, however, North East Lincolnshire has had arson problems and to a lesser degree, Scunthorpe. Due to Grimsby's teenage pregnancy levels, it has a Young Mums Unit to support pregnant schoolchildren.

== Bilateral school ==
King Edward VI Academy, is a bi-lateral secondary school and specialist Humanities College in Spilsby. The bilateral status is highly unusual, with less than five similar arrangements in the whole of England and Wales, permitting those who have passed the eleven-plus together with those who fail to study separate curriculums while under the same roof and with the same teaching staff. The school is an amalgamation of two separate institutions, the King Edward VI Grammar School opened in 1550 and the Sir John Franklin Secondary Modern School, which opened in 1954. These schools were combined in 1991 as Spilsby High School, initially retaining both sites, but now studying together in the same building.

== Sixth-form provision ==
=== Lincolnshire ===
All five comprehensive schools in the district of Lincoln have sixth forms, no matter how badly performing the school is. Conversely, outside Lincoln, many high-performing secondary modern schools have no sixth form. In September 2008, Grantham opened its first sixth form at a secondary modern, Stamford opened a sixth form at New College Stamford in 2007 and Spilsby's opened in September 2008. Since September 2008 Spalding has a mixed post-16 centre (The South Holland post 16 centre). Both secondary modern schools in Louth have a sixth form as do such schools in Holbeach, Sleaford, Bourne, Old Leake and Skegness. For secondary modern pupils, there is no sixth form in Gainsborough, Long Sutton, Horncastle (including Coningsby and Tattershall), Alford, Mablethorpe, or Caistor. The nearest main college for those last four towns at present for A levels would be the new Wolds College in Louth. In addition, since 2006, there is the new Skegness Academy, jointly run by Grimsby Institute and Boston College.

=== North Lincolnshire ===
Few comprehensive schools in North Lincolnshire have sixth forms – the only sixth forms are in Brigg, Barton-upon-Humber and none are in Scunthorpe. However, Scunthorpe has the much-praised John Leggott College. There is also the North Lindsey College, an FE college.

=== North East Lincolnshire ===
Like North Lincolnshire, pupils in North East Lincolnshire do well at A level, however few comprehensive schools similarly have a sixth form. Over on the other side of the Humber, all comprehensive schools (except one in Snaith) in the East Riding of Yorkshire have sixth forms. Three schools have sixth forms, one in Grimsby, Cleethorpes and New Waltham. It is only the one in New Waltham that gets reasonable results. The Franklin College acts as Grimby's sixth form, as well as the Grimsby Institute.

== 2007 GCSE results ==
The average percentage for 16-year-olds with grades A-C at GCSE, including Maths and English, across England is 46.7% – for Lincolnshire's 8400 pupils taking GCSE at 16 it is 50.6% – the second highest for education authorities in the East Midlands (Rutland is 58%). Some schools in Lincolnshire are woefully below this level. For the St Clement's College in Skegness, it is 5% – the lowest in Lincolnshire (although it is a secondary modern) and the third lowest result in England, but for the low-performing comprehensive Joseph Ruston College in Lincoln, it is 13% – the government target is 25% for comprehensives. For the St Bede's Catholic Science College in Boston and the Castle Hills Community College in Gainsborough it is 8% – these are secondary moderns. Lincoln has no selective schools, although its Priory School is a surrogate. It is also the largest school in Lincolnshire. The best performing secondary modern is St George's Academy in Sleaford, which achieves results better than twelve comprehensives.

The average score by council district, for the % of pupils gaining 5 grades A-C including English and Maths, is (compare to average house price by district):

1. West Lindsey 57.4
2. South Kesteven 57.3
3. North Kesteven 53.0
4. South Holland 49.0
5. East Lindsey 47.3
6. Lincoln 47.0
7. Boston 46.4
8. (North Lincolnshire Unitary Authority 40.9)
9. (North East Lincolnshire Unitary Authority 39.0)

The proportion of pupils at grammar schools in each district varies – it is 35% for Boston, 31% for South Kesteven, 23% for West Lindsey but only 16% for North Kesteven. East Lindsey, Boston and South Holland do not have any comprehensives. However, for South and North Kesteven, this will include supplementary pupils from Nottinghamshire and beyond.

== 2007 A-level results ==
Caistor Grammar School received the best A-level results for state schools in the East Midlands, followed by Bourne Grammar School, then Queen Elizabeth's High School in Gainsborough. Although North East Lincolnshire performs well under the England average at GCSE, at A-level it performs better - many areas in the Yorkshire & Humber region do not. North Lincolnshire also performs well under average at GCSE, but performs as well as Lincolnshire overall at A-level, being well above average. These two anomalies are due to the John Leggott College in Scunthorpe and the Franklin College in Grimsby – both excellent sixth form colleges. Lincolnshire gets the best results at A-level, on average, in the East Midlands (and some of the best in England for a traditional county). As found in other areas that have selective schools (e.g. Buckinghamshire and Warwickshire), the grammar schools significantly outclass the local independent schools at A-level.

== School reorganisation ==
=== Closures ===
The Lafford High School secondary modern in Billinghay is closing in 2010 due to falling pupil numbers. However, many primary schools in Boston and South Holland are struggling to cope with vast increases in numbers due to mass migration from Eastern Europe agricultural workers.

=== Academies ===
The two poorly performing comprehensives in Lincoln (Joseph Ruston and the City of Lincoln) are being replaced in September 2008 by two academies to be named under the Priory title, called the Priory Witham Academy and Priory City of Lincoln Academy, and costing £40 million to build. Boston Grammar School and Boston High School plan to merge, to local opposition.

=== Stamford ===
In Stamford, the place of grammar schools was long filled by a form of the Assisted Places Scheme that provided state funding to send children to one of the two independent schools in the town, Stamford School (boys) and Stamford High School (girls), that were formerly direct-grant grammars. The national scheme was abolished by the 1997 Labour government. The Stamford arrangements remained in place as an increasingly protracted transitional arrangement. In 2008, the council decided no new places could be funded and the arrangement finally ended in 2012. The town has one comprehensive school, Stamford Welland Academy (formerly Stamford Queen Eleanor School). This was formed in the late 1980s after the dissolution of the town's two comprehensive schools – Fane and Exeter.

=== Louth ===
Louth had a new FE college built in September 2008, called the Wolds College, next door to the Cordeaux School.

=== Scunthorpe and Grimsby ===
Most secondary schools in Scunthorpe have been renamed or replaced in the past few years. Grimsby has falling school numbers.

== Community education ==
A variety of community education programmes operate in partnership with Lincolnshire County Council, including ones at local further education colleges and others run by charitable trusts, such as Pelican Trust, or operating as community interest companies such as Community Learning in Partnership (CLIP) which provides lifelong training as well a work-based learning scheme for young people in the UK aged 16–18 who are not engaged in any kind of employment, education or training.
