= Hubbard's Hills =

Coordinates: 53°21.61′N 0°1.46′W

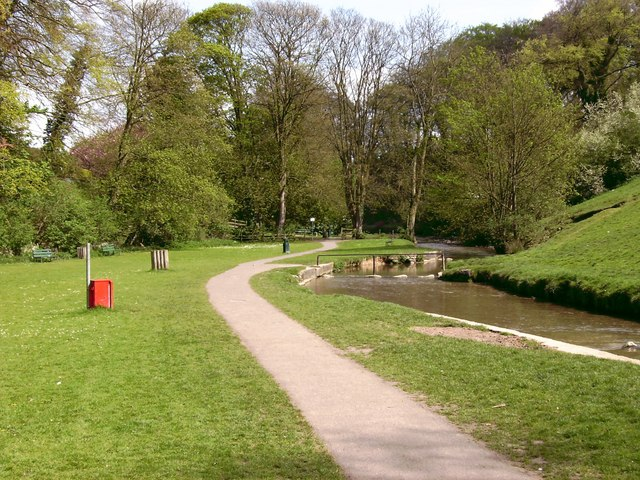

Hubbard's Hills is an area of natural beauty directly to the west of Louth, Lincolnshire, England and is popular for family picnics, school field trips and dog walking. The park is dedicated to the memory of Annie Pahud.

== Topographical geomorphology ==
Hubbard's Hills is a glacial overspill channel formed as the last ice age ended about 40,000 years ago. A marginal lake of meltwater trapped between glacial ice sheet and the Lincolnshire Wolds poured over a chalk ridge and gouged a 125-foot-deep (38 m), steep-sided valley. The river Lud, far too small to create such a valley, now meanders through it.

== History ==
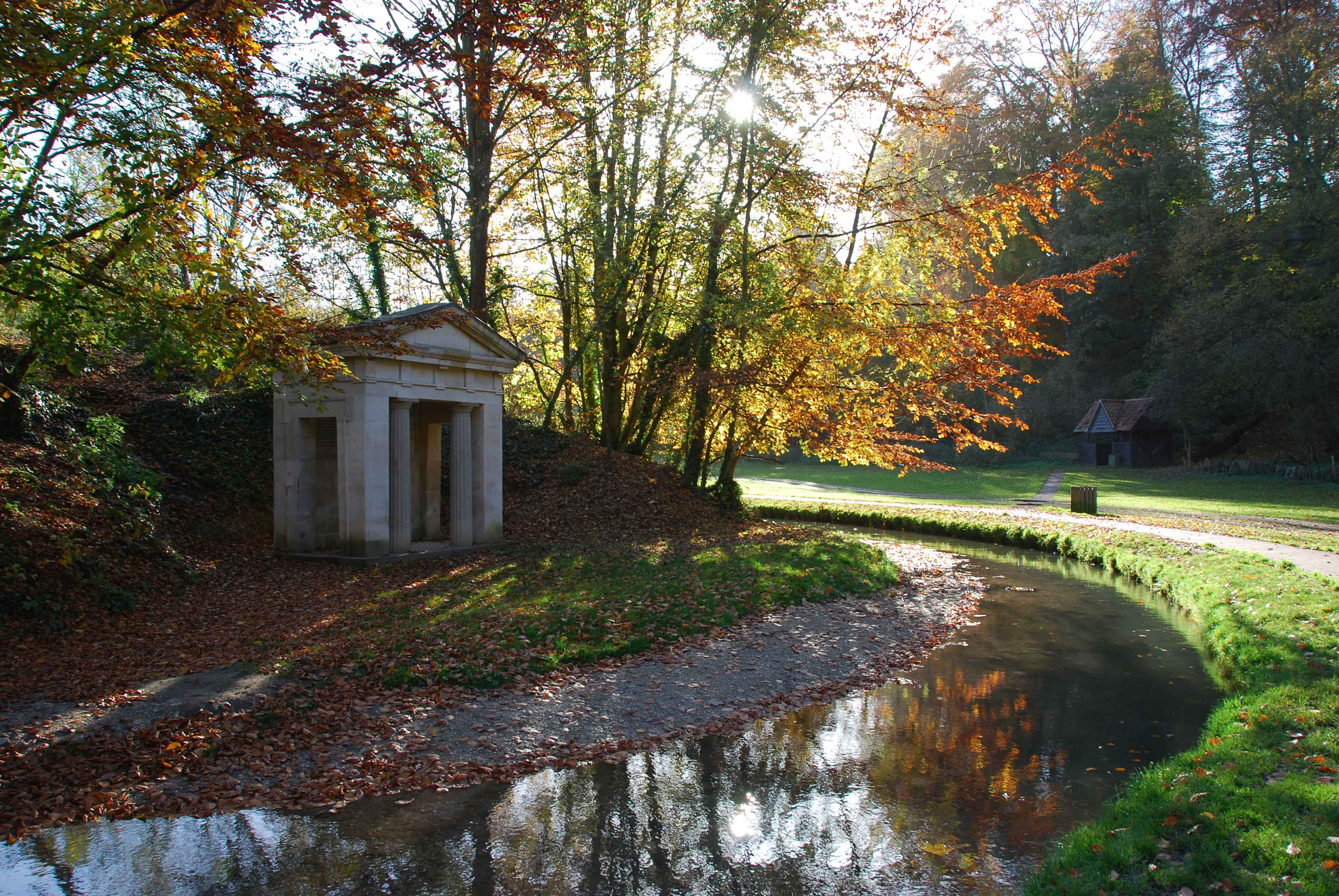
Memorial to Annie Pahud at Hubbard's Hills

Hubbard's Hills was donated to the town of Louth by the trustees of Auguste Alphonse Pahud, and opened to the public on 1 August 1907. Auguste Pahud, who was Swiss, moved to Louth in 1875 to take up duties as a German and French teacher at King Edward VI Grammar School. He married a local girl, Annie, daughter of William and Maria Grant. They were wealthy farmers living at the manor in Withern about six miles south east of Louth.

Annie Pahud died in 1889 and Auguste never got over this, committing suicide in 1902. They were buried at Withern Church, but their gravestones were removed after it was declared redundant in July 1980. The church was sold as a private residence in 1983. Annie and Auguste's gravestones are still visible on the pathway beside what used to be the church.

The trustees of Auguste Pahud bought Hubbard's Hills to honour his wish to create a memorial for Annie. They established an Edwardian pleasure garden with a lake, a country park and a memorial. The conveyance required "the natural beauty of the property and its rural character is to be forever maintained".

Following initial discussions in 2008, on 1 April 2009, East Lindsey District Council passed the responsibility to maintain the park to Hubbard's Hills Trust Limited. The Hills will however still “belong” to the people of Louth and the Town Council will continue as official custodians. The Trust's role will be to deliver on a conservation plan to safeguard the next 100 years of the Hills, replanting trees, enhancing the chalk stream and dredging the ornamental lake. Volunteers assisted with clean-up efforts in August, 2009.

== Gallery ==
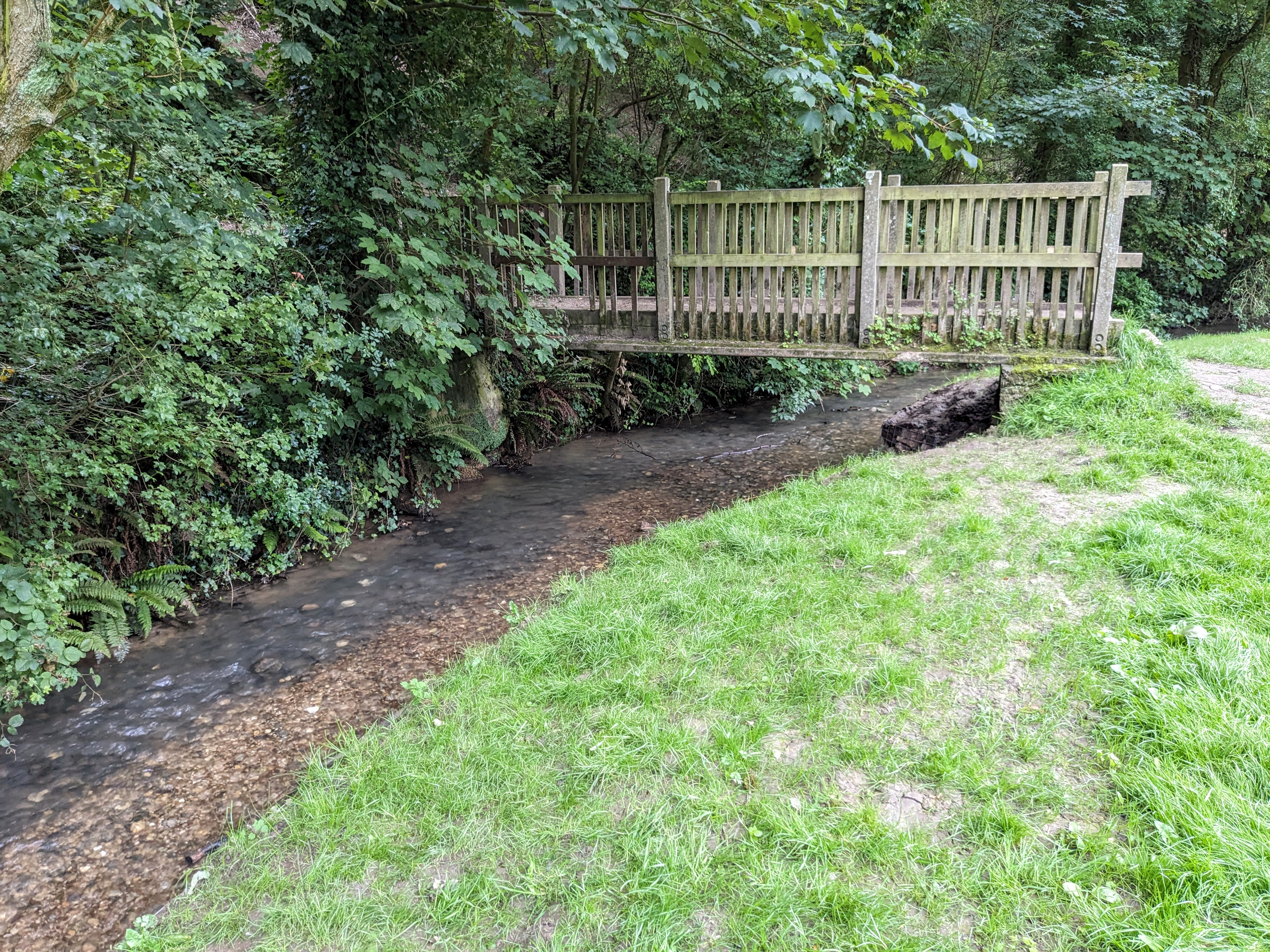
Footbridge over the River Lud.

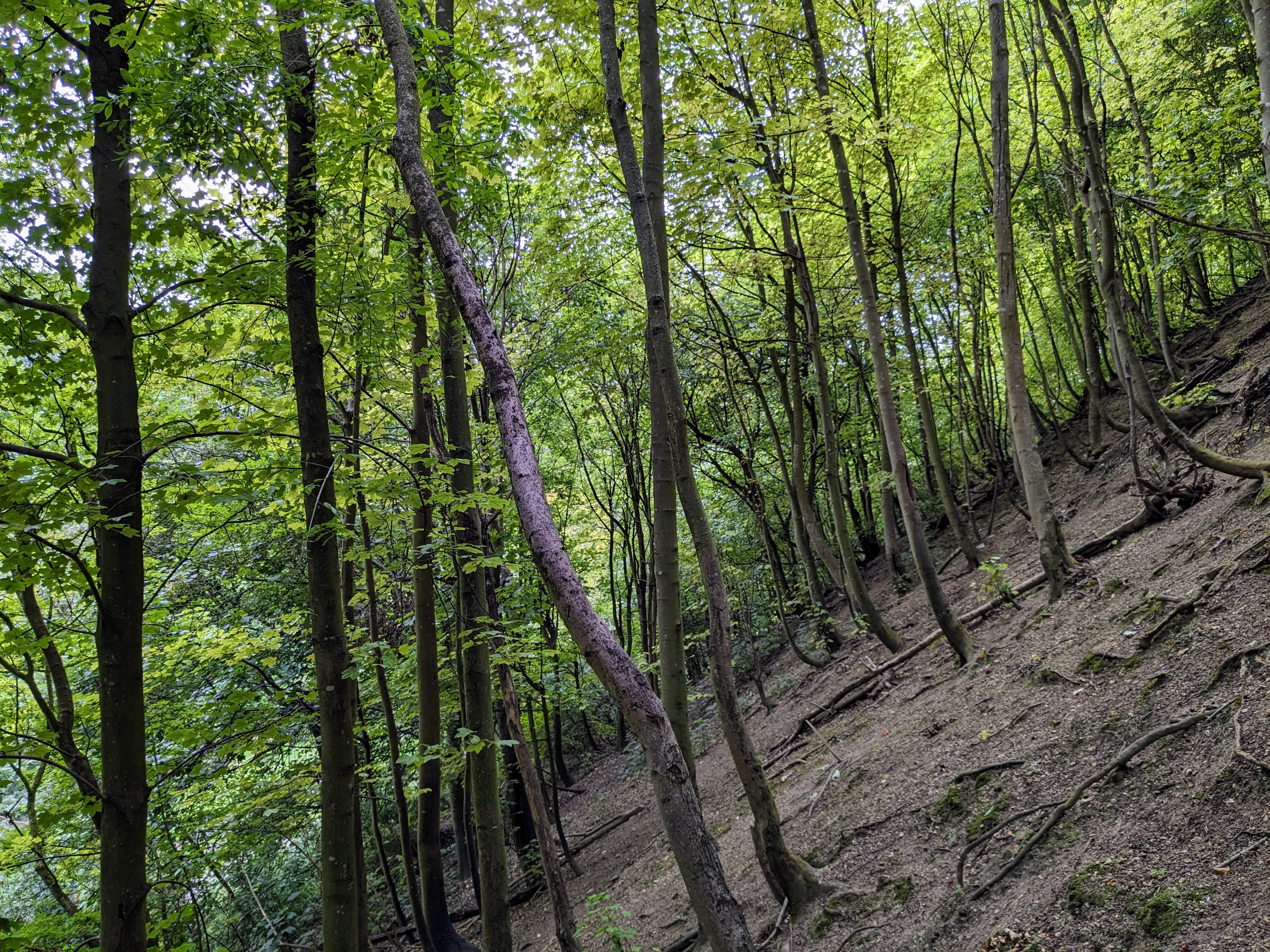
Trees on a hill in Hubbards Hills.

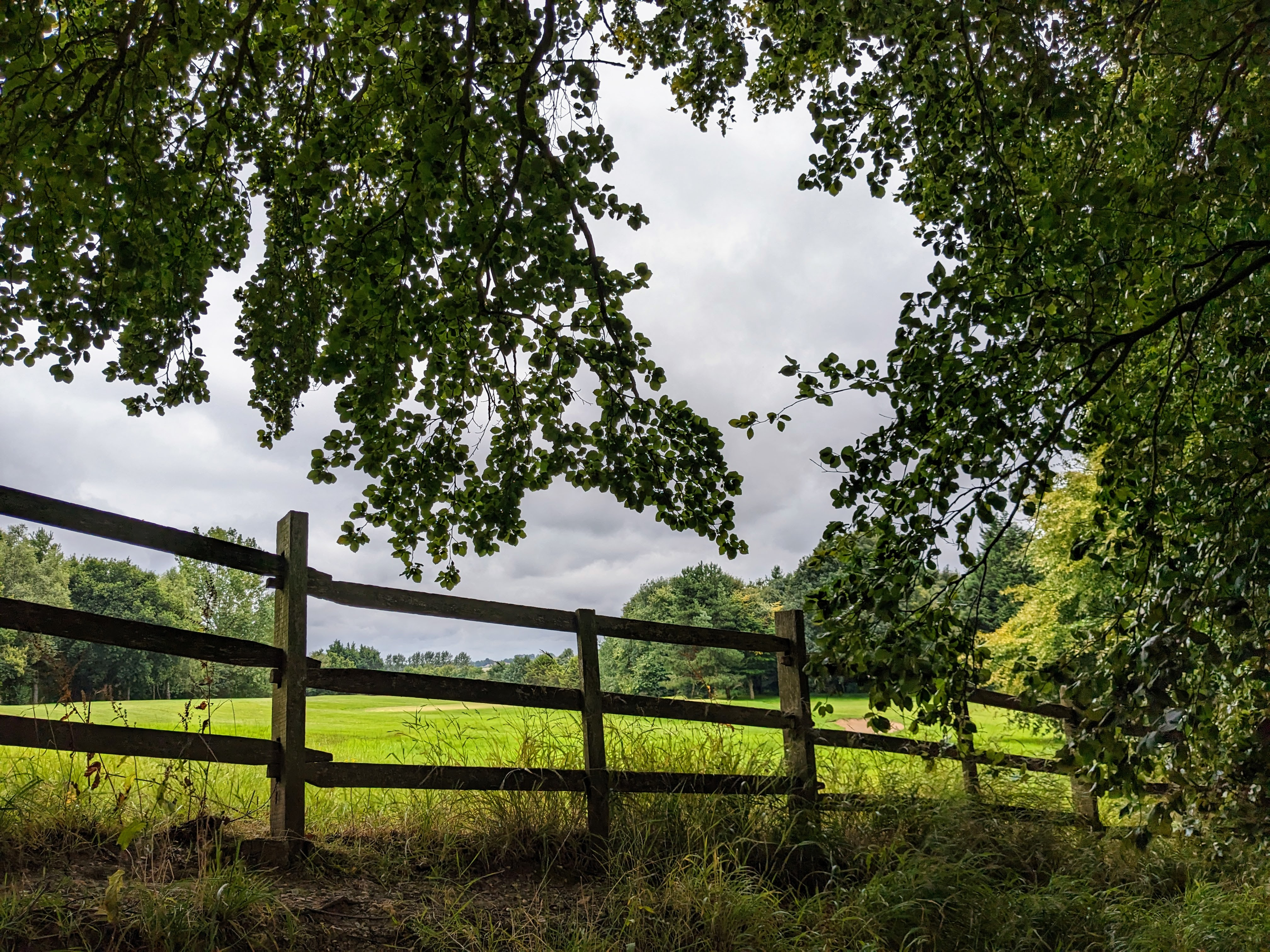
Looking towards the Louth golf course from the path.

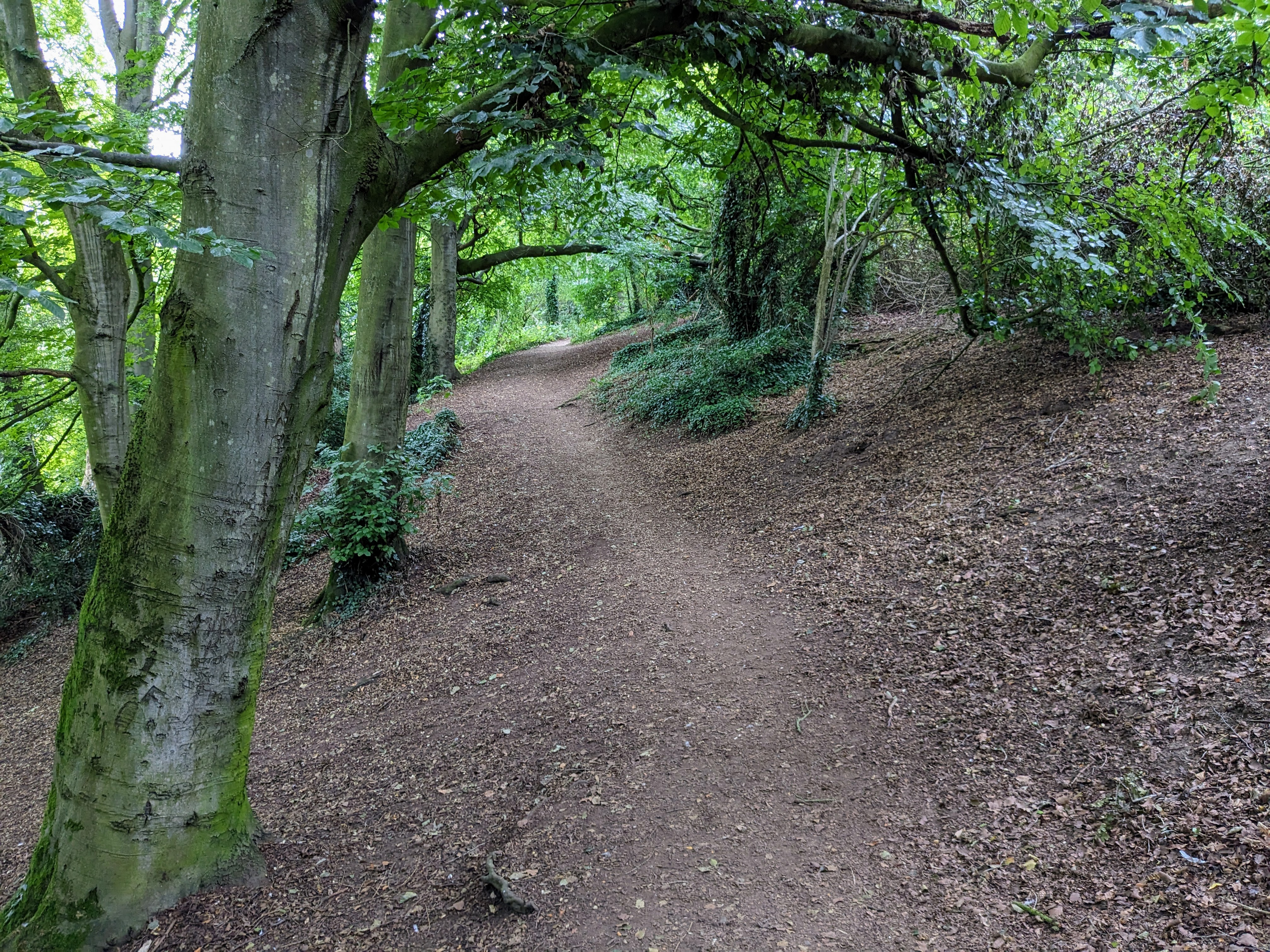
Walking along the path in Hubbards Hills.

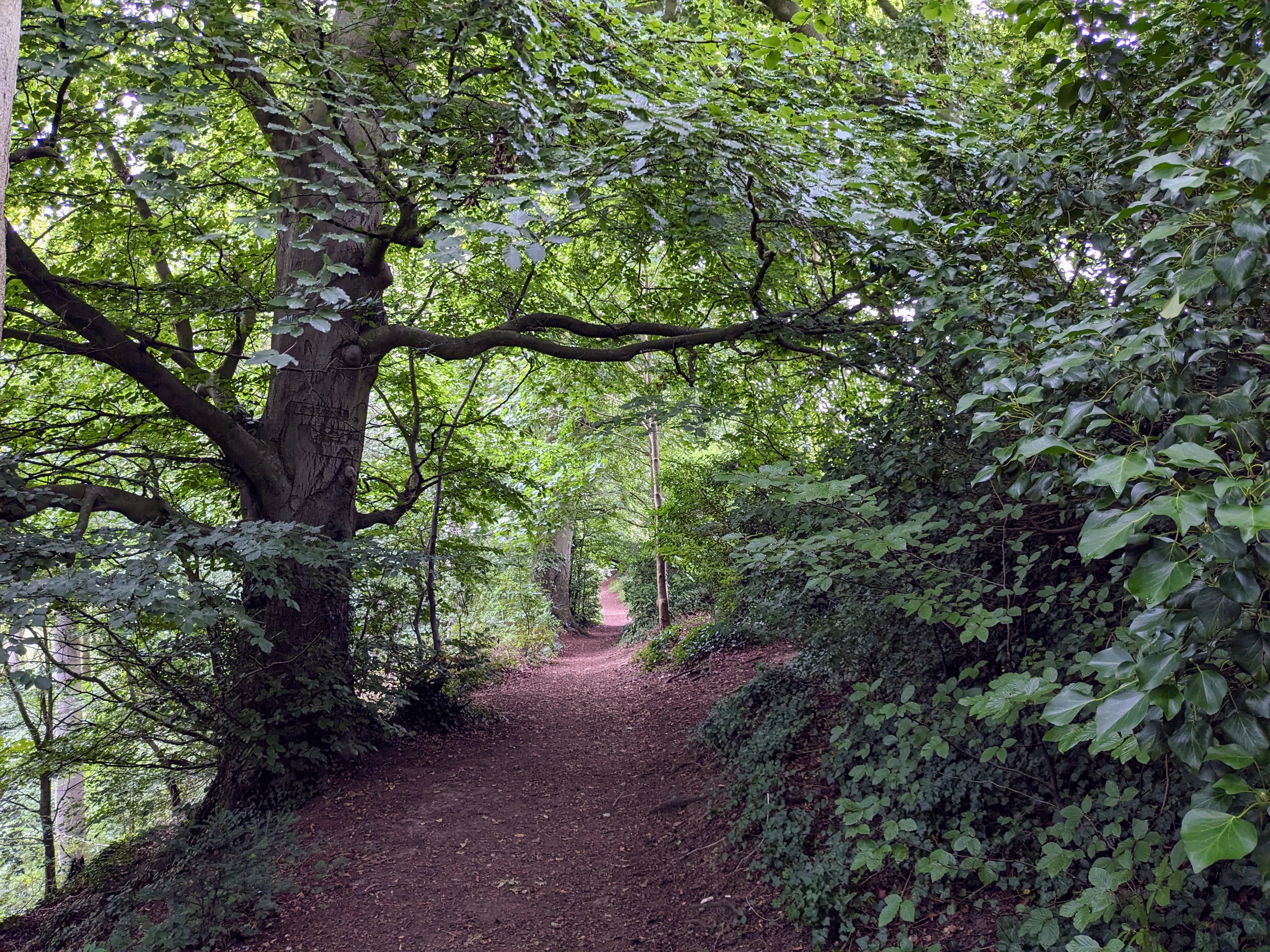
Walking along a tree-covered path in Hubbards Hills.
