= Withern =

Village in Lincolnshire, England

Coordinates: 53.312739°N 0.147445°E

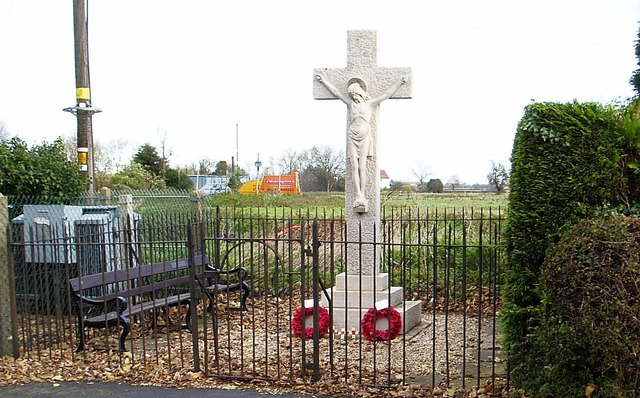
- War memorial, Withern

- Location within Lincolnshire
- Population: 380 (2011)
- OS grid reference: TF429820
  - London: 125 mi (201 km) SSW
- Civil parish: Withern with Stain
- District: East Lindsey
- Shire county: Lincolnshire
- Region: East Midlands
- Country: England
- Sovereign state: United Kingdom
- Post town: Alford
- Postcode district: LN13
- Police: Lincolnshire
- Fire: Lincolnshire
- Ambulance: East Midlands
- UK Parliament: Louth and Horncastle (UK Parliament constituency)

Withern is a village in the civil parish of Withern with Stain, in the East Lindsey district of Lincolnshire, England. It is situated on the A157 road, and 7 miles (11 km) south-east from Louth. Stain was once an independent parish but was combined with Withern when the old church of St John the Baptist was destroyed some centuries ago.

According to A Dictionary of British Place Names, the Withern name is derived from the Old English Widu or wudu, with oern, meaning "house in the Wood". Another source gives the name as deriving from Old Norse vithr "wood" + OE aerne "house", meaning "the house in the wood", giving 'Witheren' in the 14th century. In the 1086 Domesday Book, the village name is given as Widerne.

The parish was in the ancient Calceworth Wapentake in the East Lindsey district in the parts of Lindsey. After the Poor Law Amendment Act reforms of 1834, the parish became part of the Louth Poor Law Union. The common lands, some 600 acres (2.4 km^{2}), were enclosed in 1839.

The now redundant church of St Margaret's is the burial place of Auguste Pahud and Annie Pahud, whose love story is the raison d'être for the local Hubbard's Hills park. St Margaret's was rebuilt in 1812.

A Wesleyan Methodist chapel was built in 1875, though the congregation dates from about 1811.

A Public Elementary School was built in the hamlet of Stain in 1850 and enlarged in 1858 to hold 100 children. The Wesleyans built a school in 1875.

The manor house was the seat of the Fitzwilliam family. It was occupied as a farmhouse in 1900, but the moat still exists. The Grant family lived in the house at one time, their daughter being Annie Pahud.

== Population ==
Year	Population
1801	295
1831	390
1871	452
1881	457
1891	447
1911	407
2001	426
2011	380

== Governance ==
An electoral ward in the name of the Civil Parish exists. This ward stretches south east to Saleby with a total population taken at the Census of 2011 of 1,826.
