= Tom Bryant (harpist) =

Welsh harpist (1882 -1946)

Tom Bryant (1882–1946) was a Welsh harpist. He was born in Efail Isaf, nr. Pontypridd, Glamorganshire. He was given lessons on the harp by his uncle, John Bryant, and entered Eisteddfodau competitions from a young age, and often won prizes. He won the first prize at the National Eisteddfod between 1891 and 1896. He travelled extensively throughout south Wales with his friend singer Robert Rees, and with Watkin Hezekiah Williams lecturing on folk-songs.

In 1906 he was awarded the A.R.C.M., and also received King Edward VII's command to play the harp at the opening of a new dock in Cardiff.

His works include variations for the harp on the tunes ‘Merch y Felin’ and ‘Merch Megan’.

He died in 1946, and was buried in the cemetery at Tabernacl, Efail Isaf.

His son Denis became an Australian bishop.
