= Cecil Muschamp =

Bishop of Kalgoorlie

Cecil Emerson Barron Muschamp (16 June 1902 – 28 September 1984) was an Anglican bishop during the third quarter of the 20th century.

He was born in Wing, Buckinghamshire on 16 June 1902 and educated at Launceston Church Grammar School and the University of Tasmania. Ordained in 1928, in Winchester Cathedral, after an earlier career as a schoolmaster he was initially a Curate at St. Luke's Church, Bournemouth and then in All Saints Exmouth, Devon, and then in 1937, Vicar of St Michael and All Angels in Christchurch, New Zealand (during which time he served in the Solomon Islands). He was ordained to the episcopate on 21 December 1950 at St George's Cathedral, Perth to serve as Bishop of Kalgoorlie. He resigned as Bishop of Kalgoorlie in 1967. He was then Dean of Brisbane and retired in 1972. He died on 28 September 1984.

Anglican Communion titles
Preceded by William Elsey	Bishop of Kalgoorlie; 1950 – 1967	Succeeded by Denis Bryant
Preceded by Bill Baddeley	Dean of Brisbane; 1967 – 1972	Succeeded by Ian George
