= Louth, Lincolnshire =

Market town in Lincolnshire, England

Coordinates: 53.3669°N 0.0061°W

Louth
- town
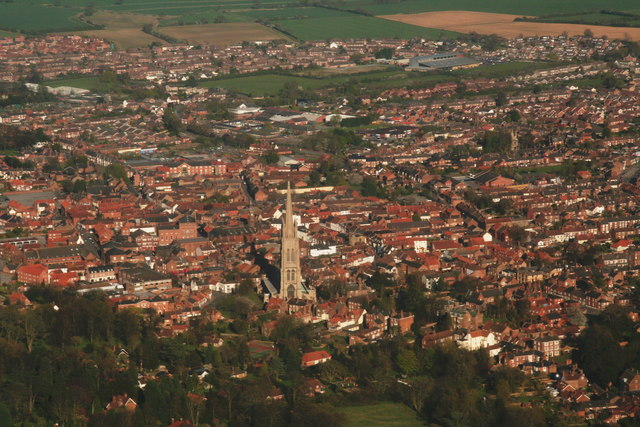
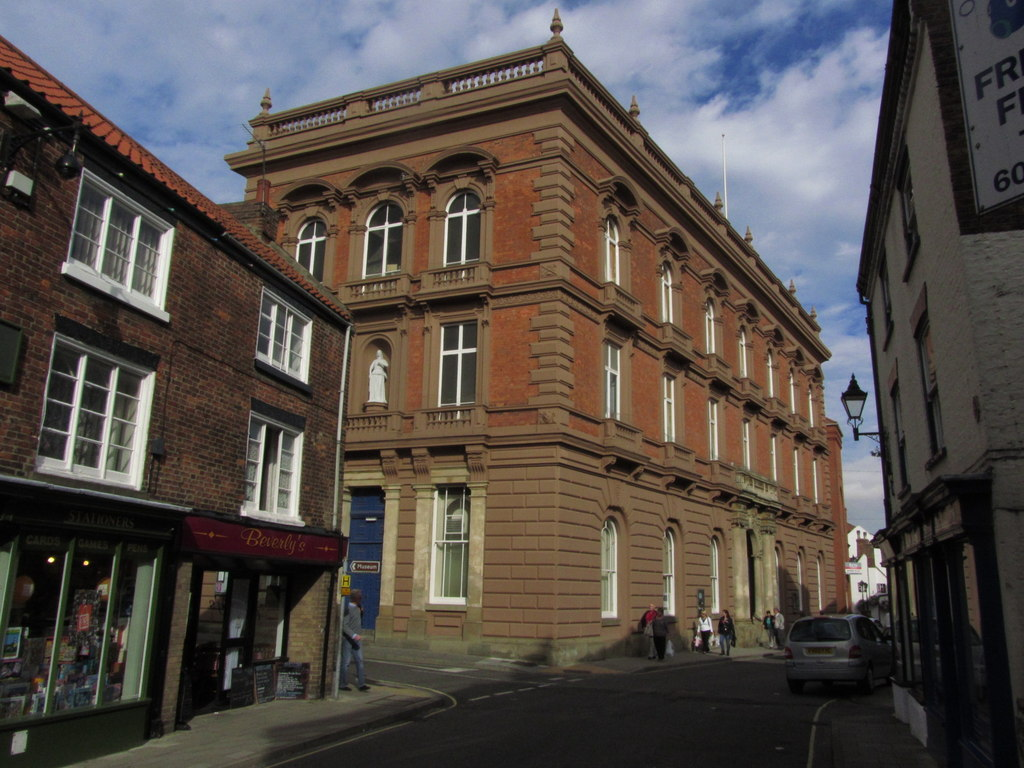
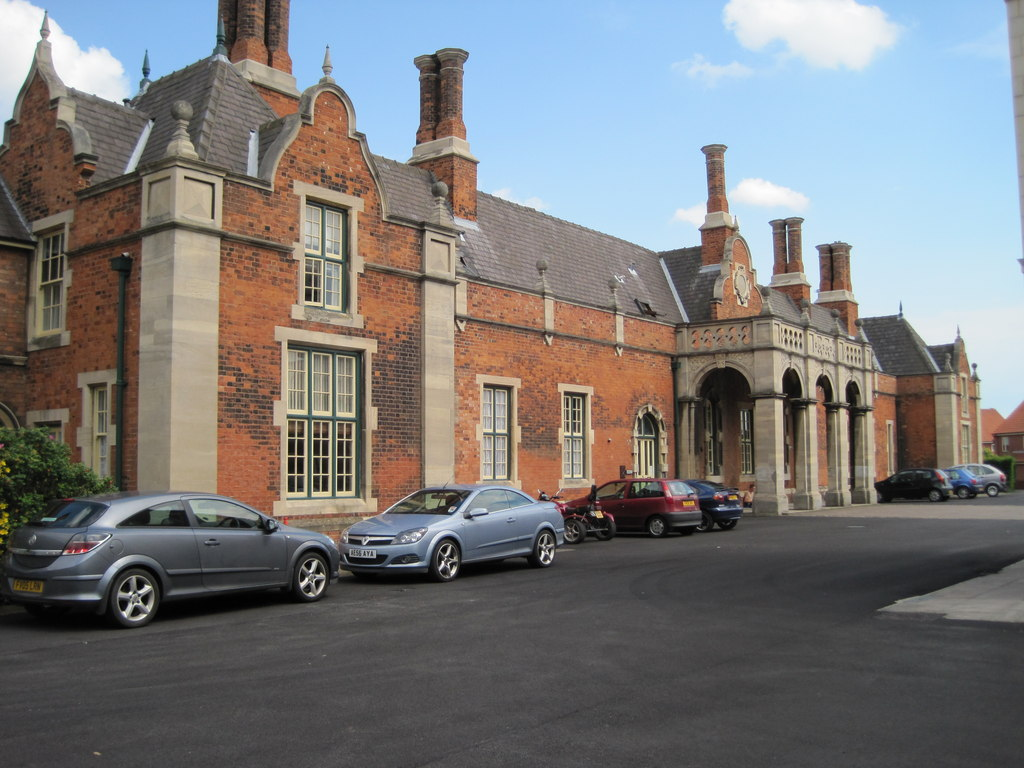
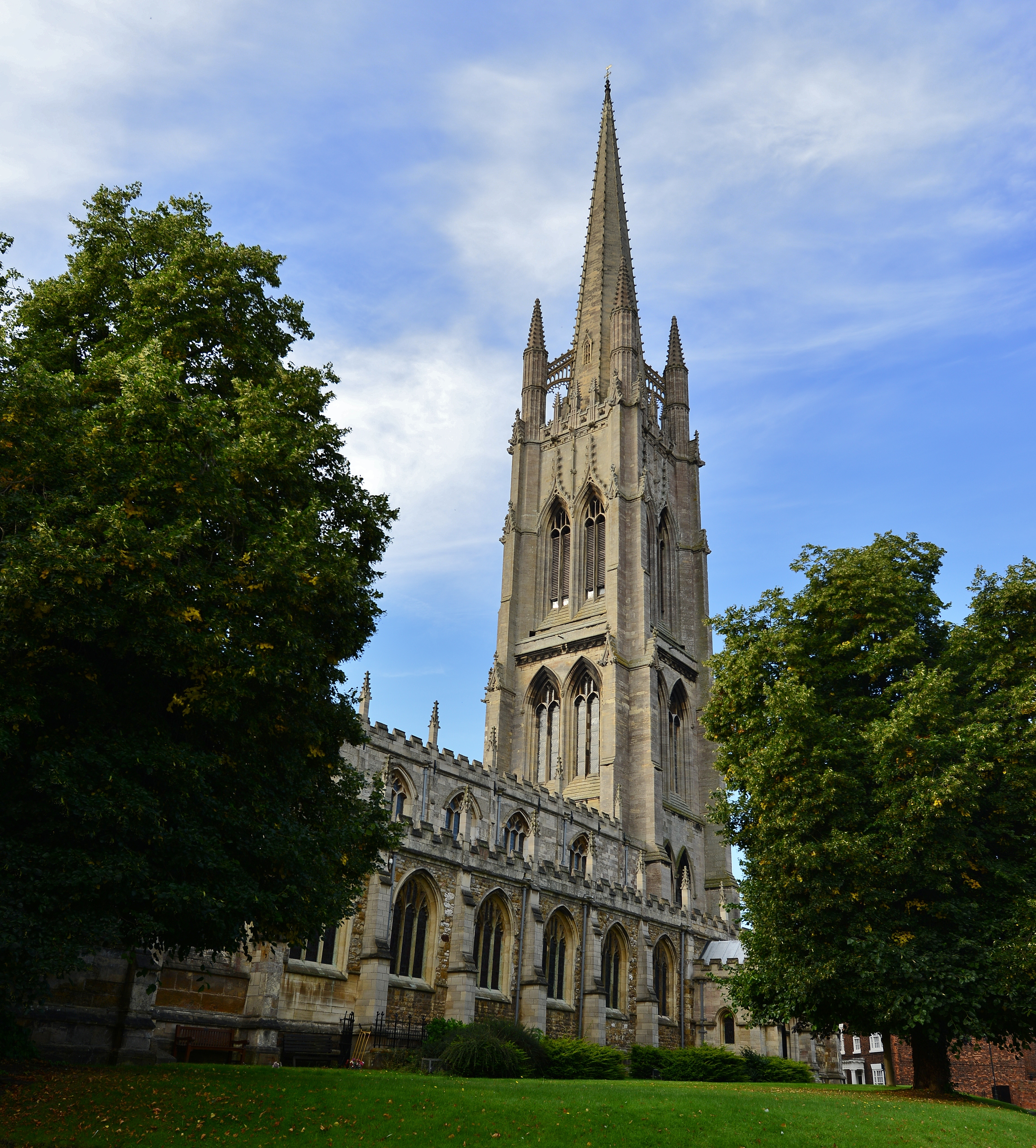
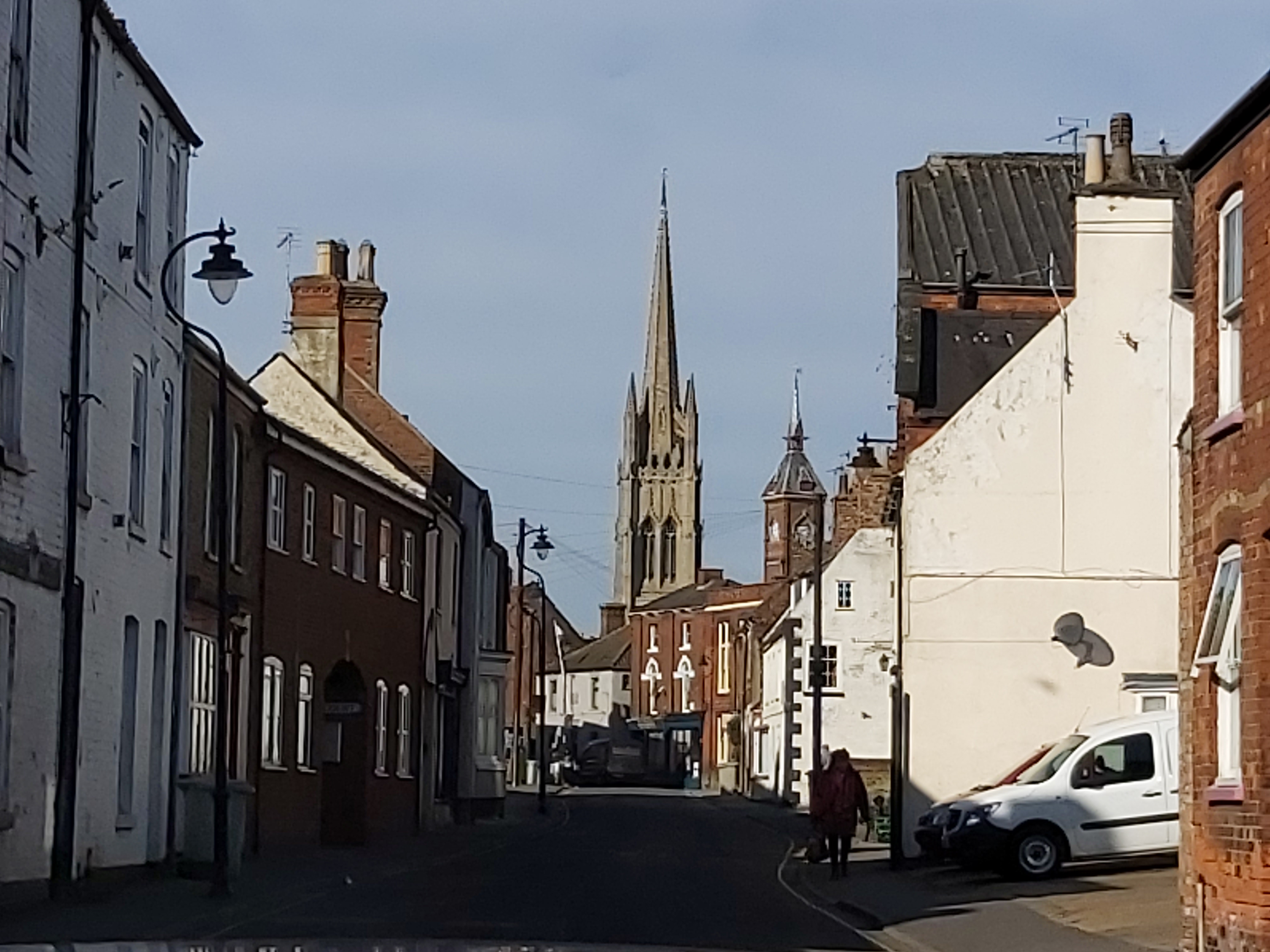
- Clockwise from top: Aerial view of Louth, Old Station Building, Queen Street, Parish Church and Town Hall

- Location within Lincolnshire
- Population: 17,382 (2021 Census)
- OS grid reference: TF326874
  - London: 130 mi (210 km) S
- Civil parish: Louth
- District: East Lindsey
- Shire county: Lincolnshire
- Region: East Midlands
- Country: England
- Sovereign state: United Kingdom
- Areas and villages of the town (2011 census BUASD): List: Acthorpe; Brackenborough; Fotherby; Hallington; Keddington; Legbourne; Little Cawthorpe; Little Grimsby; Maltby; North Holme (Ward); Priory (Ward); St James' (Ward); St Margaret's (Ward); St Mary's (Ward); St Michael's (Ward); Stewton; South Elkington; Tathwell; Trinity (Ward)
- Post town: LOUTH
- Postcode district: LN11
- Dialling code: 01507
- Police: Lincolnshire
- Fire: Lincolnshire
- Ambulance: East Midlands
- UK Parliament: Louth and Horncastle

Louth (/laʊθ/) is a market town and civil parish in the East Lindsey district of Lincolnshire, England. Louth serves as an important town for a large rural area of eastern Lincolnshire. Visitor attractions include St James' Church, Hubbard's Hills, the market, many independent retailers, and Lincolnshire's last remaining cattle market.

== Geography ==
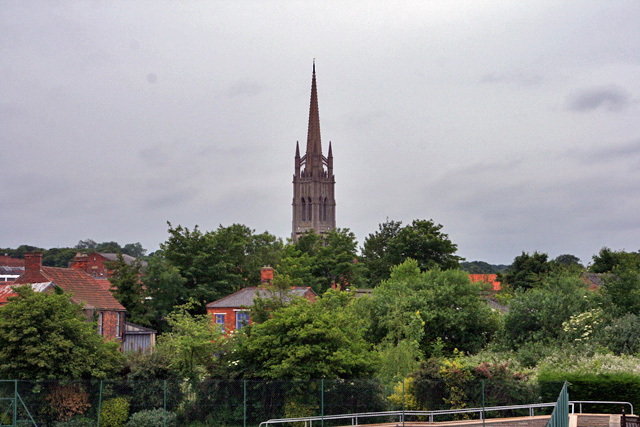
Skyline of Louth

Louth is at the foot of the Lincolnshire Wolds where they meet the Lincolnshire Marsh. It developed where the ancient trackway along the Wolds, known as the Barton Street, crossed the River Lud. The town is east of a gorge carved into the Wolds that forms the Hubbard's Hills. This area was formed from a glacial overspill channel in the last glacial period. The River Lud meanders through the gorge before entering the town.

Directly to the southeast of Louth is the village of Legbourne, to the northeast is the village of Keddington, to the northwest is the village of South Elkington, and to the southwest is the village of Hallington. The towns of Wragby, Market Rasen, Horncastle, Mablethorpe, Grimsby and Alford also are close to Louth.

The Greenwich Meridian passes through the town and is marked on Eastgate with plaques on the north and south sides of the street, just east of the junction with Northgate, although this location is known to be incorrect as the line actually passes through a point just west of Eastgate's junction with Church Street. A three-mile (5 km) £6.6 million A16 Louth Bypass opened in 1991. The former route through the town is now designated as the B1520.

== History ==
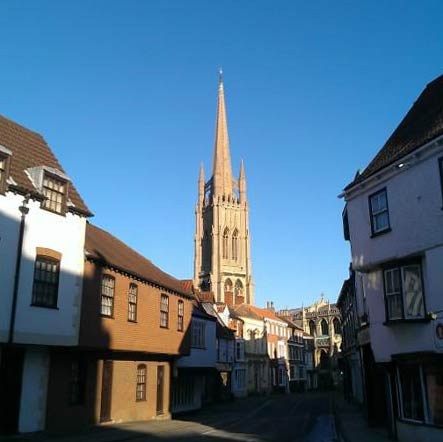
St James' Church, Louth

Three handaxes have been found on the Wolds surrounding Louth, dating from between 424,000 and 191,000 years ago, indicating inhabitation in the Paleolithic era. Bronze Age archeological finds include a 'barbed and tanged' arrowhead found in the grounds of Monks' Dyke Tennyson College.

St Helen's Spring, at the Gatherums, off Aswell Street, is dedicated to a popular medieval saint, the mother of Constantine the Great, the first Roman Emperor to become a Christian, but is thought to be a Christianised Romano-British site for veneration of the pagan water-goddess Alauna.

The Anglo-Saxon pagan burial ground northwest of Louth dates from the fifth-to-sixth centuries, and was first excavated in 1946. With an estimated 1200 urn burials, it is one of the largest Anglo-Saxon cremation cemeteries in England.

Æthelhard, a Bishop of Winchester who was made Archbishop of Canterbury in 793, was an abbot of Louth in his early life.

Louth is listed in the 1086 Domesday Book as a town of 124 households.

Louth Park Abbey was founded in 1139 by the Bishop Alexander of Lincoln as a daughter-house of the Cistercian Fountains Abbey in Yorkshire. Following its dissolution in 1536 it fell into ruin and, today, only earthworks survive, on private land, between Louth and Keddington. Some of the ruins were incorporated into The Priory (now a hotel) by Thomas Espin. Monks' Dyke, now a ditch, was originally dug to supply the abbey with water from the springs of Ashwell and St. Helen's at Louth.

In 1643, Sir Charles Bolles, a resident of Louth, raised a 'hastily-got-up soldiery' for the Royalist cause in the English Civil War. Fighting took place in, and around the town and, at one point, Bolles was forced to take refuge under the Ramsgate bridge. By the battle's end 'Three strangers, being souldgeres, was slain at a skirmish at Lowth, and was buryed'. Human remains, found during archaeological visits to Louth Park Abbey during the 1800s, in 'a little space surrounded by a ditch', were believed to date from the Civil War as two cannonballs, from that era, were found with the bodies.

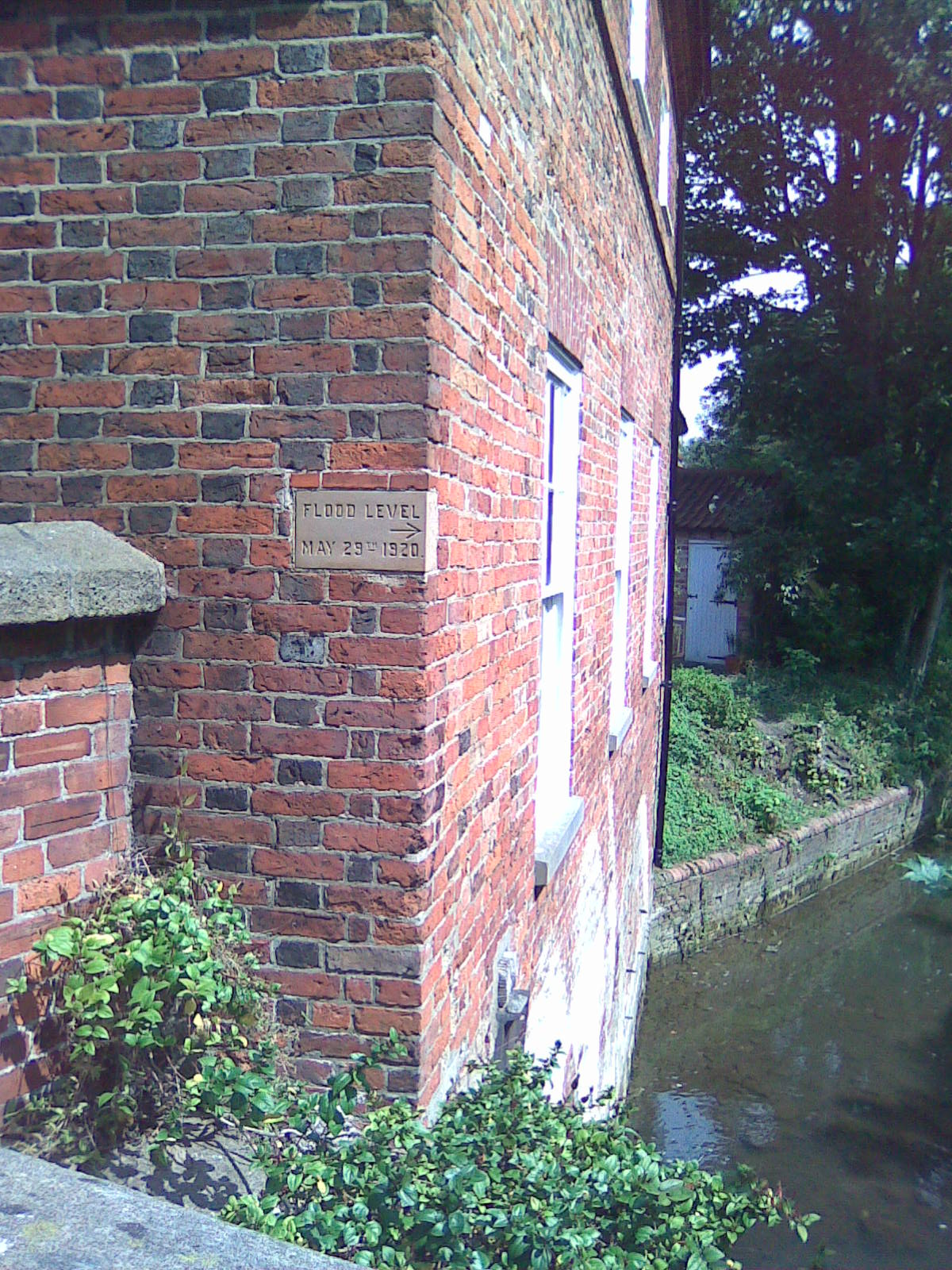
A stone plaque on Bridge Street showing the flood water level.

The Louth flood of 1920 occurred in the town on 29 May 1920, causing 23 deaths. One woman climbed a chimney to survive, another was the only survivor from a row of twelve terrace houses, which were destroyed by the flood waters. Four stone plaques exist in the town to show how high the water level reached. Other, less devastating floods occurred in July 1968 and on 25 June and 20 July in 2007.

Margaret Wintringham succeeded her husband Thomas at the Louth by-election in September 1921, to become the Liberals' first female MP, and Britain's third female MP.

Between December 1969 and October 1974, Jeffrey Archer was Louth's MP.

=== St Herefrith of Louth ===
St Herefrith, or Herefrid, is Louth's 'forgotten saint', whose feast day is 27 February. He was a bishop, who died around 873, possibly killed by the Danes. An 11th-century text describes Herefrith as Bishop of Lincoln, but as the bishopric there dates to 1072, Lincoln more probably refers to Lindsey, the early name for Lincolnshire. Similar confusion exists in an inventory of Louth's St. James Church, written in 1486 and transcribed in 1512, where he is referred to as a Bishop of Auxerre, France.

At some point, following his death, a shrine venerating him was established at Louth. Æthelwold, the Bishop of Winchester from 963 to 984, was actively seeking relics for his newly rebuilt Thorney Abbey in Cambridgeshire and sent his monks to Louth to raid Herefrith's shrine. From an 11th-century account, Æthelwold had:

...heard of the merits of the blessed Herefrid bishop of Lincoln resting in Louth a chief town of the same church. When all those dwelling there had been put to sleep by a cunning ruse, a trusty servant took him out of the ground, wrapped him in fine line cloth, and with all his fellows rejoicing brought him to the monastery of Thorney and re-interred him.

A church dedicated to St. Herefrith, at Louth, appears in accounts from the 13th to 15th centuries, and one of his relics, an ivory comb, is recorded among the possessions of Louth's St. James Church in 1486. Suggestions that the shrine, and later church, of St. Herefrith, were earlier incarnations of St. James have "no supportive evidence", but St James' is the site of two earlier churches of which little is known, although the possession of relics of Herefrith within the parish church of St James and the continued celebration of his feast-day until the reformation period are suggestive of this possibility.

== Transport ==
There are regular bus services connecting Louth with nearby Grimsby, Skegness, Mablethorpe and Lincoln. Different companies provide these, the main one being Stagecoach. However, Louth is not served by late-night services; the last bus leaves the town at 7:30pm and buses do not run on Sundays, except to Grimsby.

The nearest active railway stations are now at Market Rasen, Grimsby Town and Skegness.

Louth is on two National Express coach routes. One is from Grimsby to Birmingham via Lincoln and Leicester, and the other is from Grimsby to London via Lincoln and Nottingham.

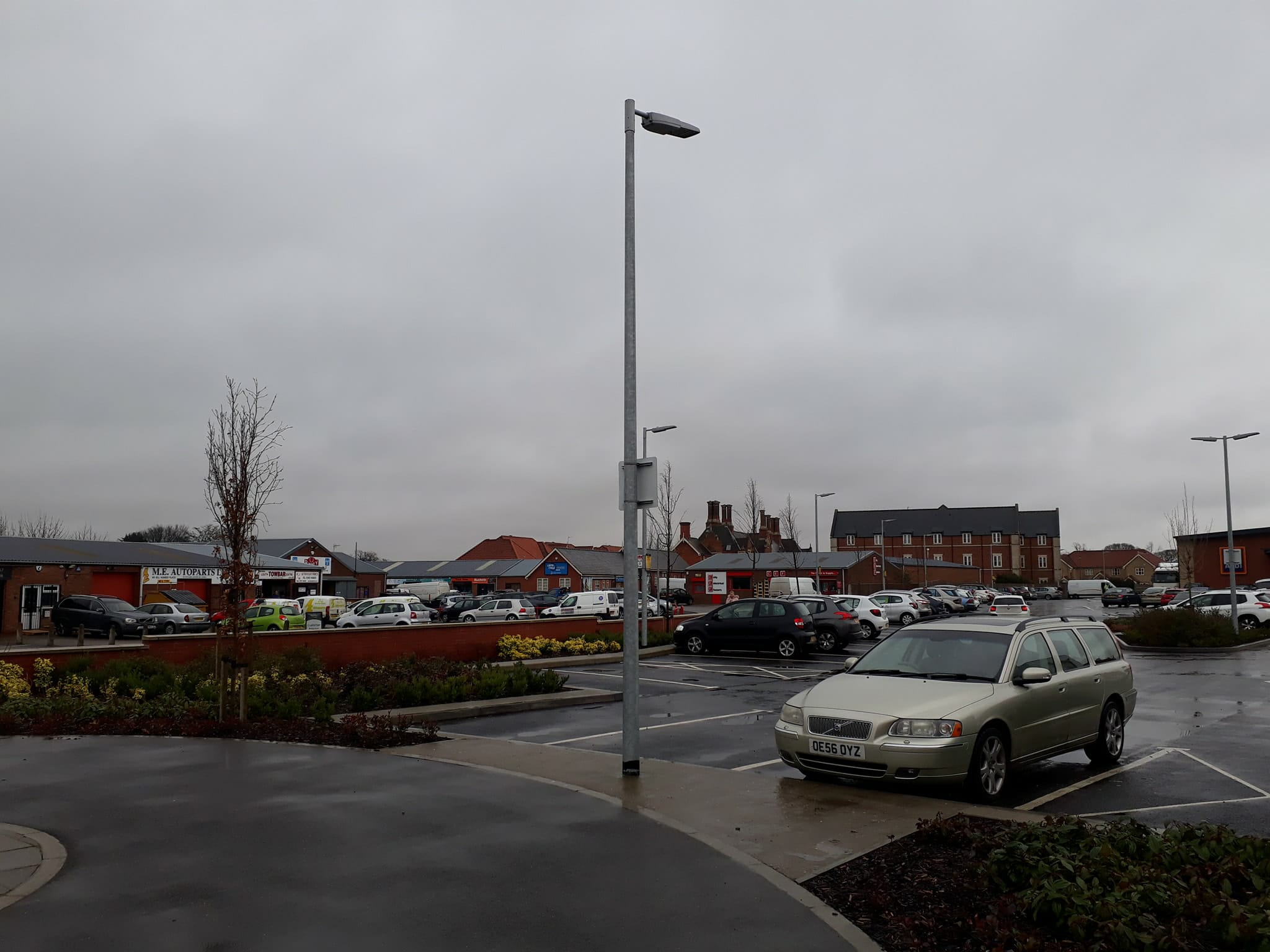
The site of Louth station, goods yard and the former kilns. The last trains here were in 1980 before complete closure. The entire area is now a mix of housing, retail and industrial outlets. The station building can be seen in the distance with the chimneys.

Louth railway station was a major intermediate station on the East Lincolnshire Railway which ran from Boston to Grimsby from 1848 and was also once served by rail motor services. The station had an extensive good yards which served the malt kilns.

Louth was the northern terminus of the Mablethorpe Loop, which ran through the nearby villages and seaside towns of Mablethorpe, Sutton-on-Sea, Grimoldby, Saltfleetby, Theddlethorpe, Mumby and Willoughby. The station was the terminus on the Louth to Bardney Line, which opened in 1876 but closed in 1951 to passengers and to freight traffic in 1960. Bardney was the connection of the branch line and the Lincolnshire Loop Line

The station closed to passengers in 1970 along with the Mablethorpe Loop Line and the section from Firsby to Louth of the East Lincolnshire Railway. The section to Grimsby remained in use for freight traffic until December 1980 when it closed and was later removed. The station building and Louth North Signal Box remain as private dwellings. All of the station site has been built on by residential and commercial outlets.

There are plans to have Louth as the southern terminus of the Lincolnshire Wolds Railway using the trackbed from Holton-Le-Clay, although the station will be north of Louth because the existing station building is occupied and the site around it built over. This would mean Louth would have a rail connection for the first time in almost 50 years.

Louth Canal was built between 1765 and 1770 to connect Louth to the sea at Tetney. It was formally abandoned in 1924.

== St James' Church ==
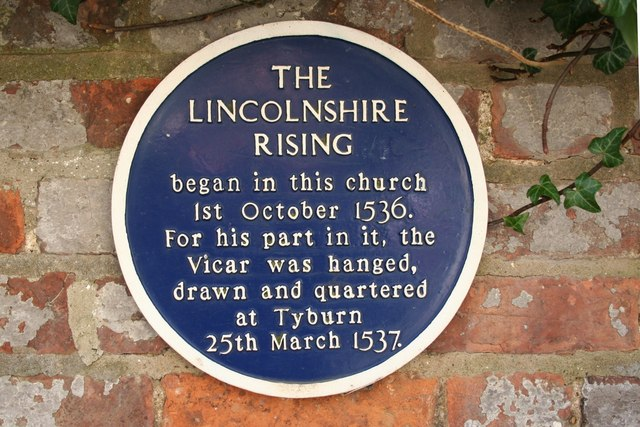
Lincolnshire Rising plaque in Louth

The town was the origin of the Lincolnshire Rising, which started on 1 October 1536 in St James Church. The rising began after Rev. Thomas Kendall, the incumbent, gave an 'emotive sermon', the evening before the King's Commissioners were due to arrive and assess the church's wealth. Some of the townspeople, fearful that the church treasury would be seized by the men of the Crown, demanded the building's keys. The townspeople kept vigil that night, and, the following day, rang the church bells, 'an ancient call to rebellion', to gather a crowd. Having begun marching from Louth, 50,000 supporters converged to camp at Hembleton Hill, the following evening, before they continued to Lincoln to confront the King's Commissioners.

The town's skyline is dominated by the spire of St James' Church. A recent survey has confirmed the height of the stonework as 287 feet 6 inches (87.63 m) and to the top of the cockerel weather vane as 293 feet 1 inch (89.33 m). It also confirms it as one of the very finest medieval steeples in the country. Though shorter than both Norwich Cathedral (315 feet/96 m) and Salisbury Cathedral (404 feet/123 m), it is the tallest medieval parish church spire in the United Kingdom. The building of the spire started in 1501 and was finally completed in 1515.

In 2015 two pieces of a pre-Conquest standing stone cross dating to c. 950 were found in the adjoining rectory garden. The cross is of the 'ring' or 'wheel head' type, the central design being of Christ crucified, a form more commonly seen today in Ireland. The cross and its implications for the archaeology, history and the early church in Louth are discussed in an article in the journal Medieval Archaeology. The Louth Cross is on display within the church and a small booklet is available from the gift shop.

In 2017 funding was raised to fit a viewing door to the cell just below the spire floor that holds the original medieval treadwheel that was used to haul up the stone and mortar for the building of the spire (1501–1515). Substantial records exist in the churchwardens' accounts from 1501 onward for the construction and use of the wheel which was to become known as The Wild Mare. A small booklet about this rare survival is available from the church gift shop.

== Governance ==
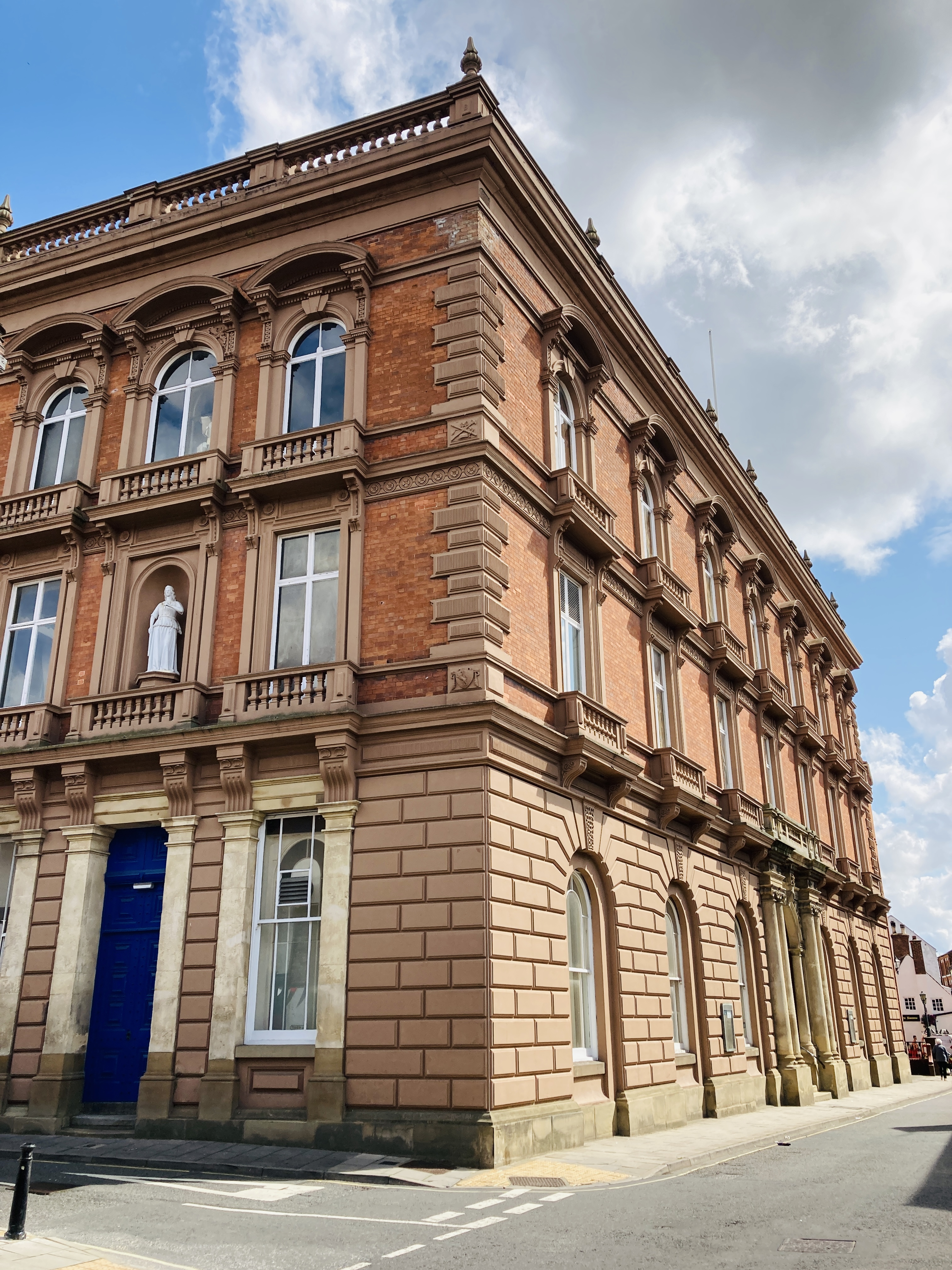
Louth Town Hall

Louth Town Council undertakes local administration. The council met at Louth Town Hall until 2012 when it relocated to the Sessions House. It consists of 21 councillors elected from seven town wards; North Holme, Priory, St James', St Margaret's, St Mary's, St Michael's, and Trinity.

== Landmarks and places of interest ==
Much of the town centre is lined with brick buildings from the 17th and 18th centuries. Louth Museum was designed by John James Cresswell in 1910. It has a Panorama Gallery, which features two back-lit replicas of William Brown's Panorama of Louth viewed from the top of St James' spire in 1844. The two original paintings that together form the panorama hang side-by-side in the Louth Town Council building – the Sessions House – on Eastgate. The panorama gives a unique and vivid representation of the streets, businesses, homes and people of the town and the landscape as far as the North Sea to the east and northwards to the Humber Estuary and beyond.

ABM Pauls (now ForFarmers) used to have a large malt kiln, which was the first of its kind built in Europe to an American design out of reinforced concrete in 1949. The site had been the location of a maltings since 1870 which was destroyed by German bombs in 1940, and had to be built on the old site to qualify for war compensation. At its height the maltings processed 50,000 tonnes of barley per year, with exports handled through the nearby port of Immingham. The maltings closed in 1998 and the 120 feet (37 m) tall structure was left derelict for many years. The German supermarket chain Aldi was granted permission to build a new store on the site, and it was demolished in 2014/15.

Hubbard's Hills is one of the town's main attractions. It was opened to the public in 1907. The park is in a glacial overspill channel that forged the course for a small river, the Lud. It meanders along the deep, flat valley bottom between steep, wooded slopes on either side.

The Louth Panorama, located in the Old Courtroom of Louth Town Council, is a 360-degree depiction of the town painted on two large canvases. It was created in 1844 by artist William Brown, who sketched the view from scaffolding erected for repairs to St James' Church spire.

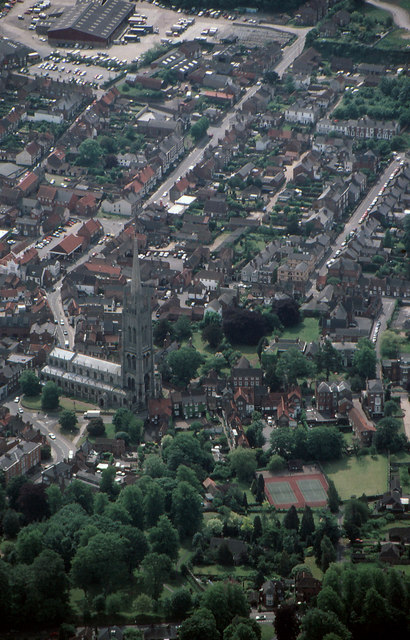
Aerial view of part of Louth

The Belmont television and radio mast, once one of the tallest structures in the European Union (until its height was reduced in 2010), is in the nearby village of Donington on Bain, 5 miles (8 km) west of the town.

Louth will be the eventual southern terminus of the Lincolnshire Wolds Railway, based at nearby Ludborough. The town was formerly on the East Lincolnshire Railway from Peterborough to Grimsby, an important north–south route especially for holidaymakers in the summer. It opened in 1848. The line to Mablethorpe started in the town from 1877, closing in 1960. The section to Wainfleet closed in 1961, with the Louth to Grimsby section later continuing for passengers until October 1970, with freight stopping in 1980. The former station is now residential flats; there are other reminders still standing.

Louth Town Hall, which was designed in the Palazzo style, was completed in 1854. Louth Cemetery, with its distinctive gate lodge, opened in 1855.

Alfred Lord Tennyson was educated at King Edward VI Grammar School. A stone inscription to commemorate this forms part of a wall on Schoolhouse Lane in Louth.

St James' Church has the tallest church spire in Lincolnshire and is one of the tallest spires on a church in England. It is the tallest building in Louth and can be seen for miles on a clear day.

== Shopping and local economy ==
Louth is noted for the wide selection of independent retailers, with around 70% of businesses independently owned. In 2012, it was named 'Britain's Favourite market town' by the BBC's Countryfile.

The town's long retail history is represented by a number of longstanding businesses, including the department store Eve and Ranshaw which closed down on 4 February 2023 after 240 years. Dales & Sons, poulterers since 1896, and the century-old butchers, Lakings of Louth.

The first building society branch office was opened by the Peterborough Building Society (now Norwich & Peterborough) in 1973 in Mercer Row. The town was also the headquarters of the former Louth, Mablethorpe and Sutton Building Society, a local society with several branches and agents in Lincolnshire, which was taken over by the Bradford & Bingley in 1990.

Louth is also known for its specialist grocers, and local butchers, Meridian Meats, have won numerous awards. It is also home to The Cheese Shop, which has gained nationwide recognition, including in The Daily Telegraph, The Guardian, and on The Hairy Bikers' Food Tour of Britain.

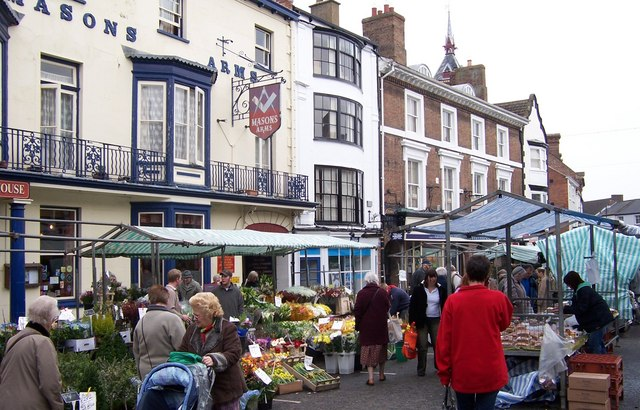
Street market in Louth

Louth holds market days on Wednesdays, Fridays and Saturdays. There is a farmers' market on the fourth Wednesday of each month. A cattle market is held each Thursday at the Louth Livestock Centre on Newmarket.

There is a small Morrisons, formerly a Somerfield store, which opened in 1985, and a Co-operative supermarket, which opened in 1989. The Co-op was given approval for an additional smaller store in 2013.

In 2008, a local pressure group, Keep Louth Special, was formed by residents, shoppers and business owners, to lobby against a proposal for a major supermarket on the former cattle market site. The group was criticised by a town councillor, the following year, as 'outsiders' who wanted to live in a 'museum town', but a 2012 council report, while recommending a 'large retail development' as ‘necessary’, acknowledged that 'a majority 50 per cent' of surveyed residents opposed it. An initial 2009 planning application by Sainsbury's for a new 30,000 square feet (2,800 m^{2}) store, was rejected by the council, after appeal, in 2012. Keep Louth Special described a 2013 proposal for an Aldi store as 'not bad news' because it was intended for an 'eyesore' site, and as Aldi stocks 'own brands and a limited fresh-food offering', it would not be 'going head-to-head' with the town market or independent retailers.

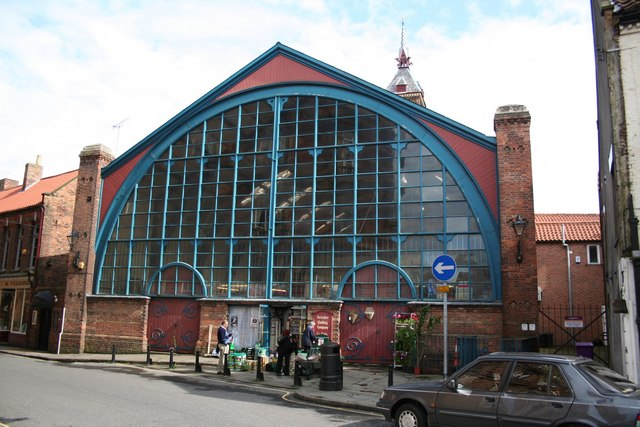
Old Market Hall, Louth

Many national food campaigning organisations are based on Eastgate under the umbrella organisation the Processed Vegetable Growers Association, notably:

- The Asparagus Growers Association
- The Brassica Growers Association
- The British Herb Trade Association
- The British Onion Producers Association
- The Leek Growers Association
- The Radish Growers Association
- The Turfgrass Association

== Demographics ==
At the 2021 census, Louth's built up area had a population of 17,429. Of the findings, the ethnicity and religious composition of the ward was:

North Hykeham: Ethnicity: 2021 Census
Ethnic group	Population	%
White	17,003	97.6%
Mixed	203	1.2%
Asian or Asian British	147	0.8%
Black or Black British	35	0.2%
Other Ethnic Group	28	0.2%
Arab	8	0.1%
Total	17,429	100%

The religious composition of the ward at the 2021 Census was recorded as:

North Hykeham: Religion: 2021 Census
Religious	Population	%
Christian	8,351	51.3%
Irreligious	7,697	47.3%
Other religion	79	0.5%
Muslim	62	0.4%
Buddhist	48	0.3%
Hindu	34	0.2%
Jewish	5	0.1%
Total	17,429	100%

== Community and culture ==
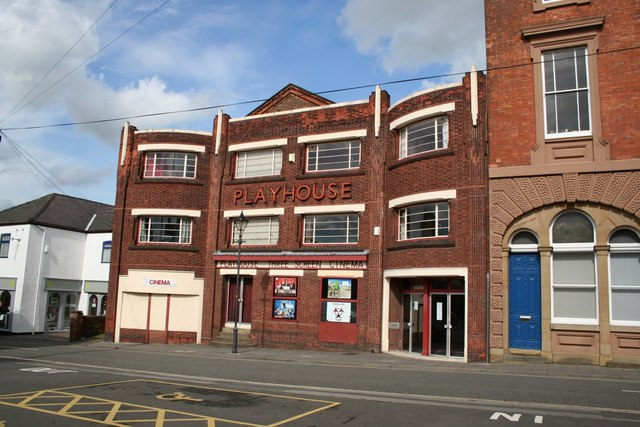
Playhouse Cinema, Louth

The town's Playhouse Cinema is on Cannon Street, and is home to Louth Film Club, which won the British Federation of Film Societies' Film Society of the Year Award in 2008. Louth Playgoers Society's Riverhead Theatre is on Victoria Road, to the east of the town.

Louth is home to The New Orleans Club, a not-for-profit members' club dedicated to keeping alive the music of jazz.

Corinne Drewery, of British pop band Swing Out Sister, grew up in the area and retired English rock drummer Robert Wyatt is a resident.

Transition Town Louth is a community project, which organizes various events in and around the town aimed at promoting awareness of climate change and unsustainable resources. Part of a large social movement, many Transition Towns are now developing. A sub-group, the Community Food Gardens are encouraging a shift towards sustainable communities.

== Sport and leisure ==
The Meridian Leisure Centre opened on 6 February 2010. By 2013 had received almost one million visits and was home to over 20 clubs. It cost £12 million and consists of an 8-lane, 25-metre swimming pool and a two-level gym with over 80 pieces of equipment, along with a sports hall and other facilities. Louth Technology Hub, which is using 3D display technology, with a focus on sports groups and clubs, opened on the centre's upper floor in October 2013.

Louth Tennis Centre is situated on Fairfield Industrial Estate to the north of the town and has indoor and outdoor tennis facilities.

There is a multiuse sports pavilion on London Road, which includes football pitches, a cricket pitch and a multi-use astroturf pitch.

Louth Cricket Club was formed in 1822 and play their home games at the London Road sports pavilion.

Louth is home to Louth Town Football Club which plays in the Lincolnshire Football League.

In the Wolds to the south-west of the town, around 4 miles (6.4 km) away, is Cadwell Park motor racing circuit between the villages of Scamblesby and Tathwell.

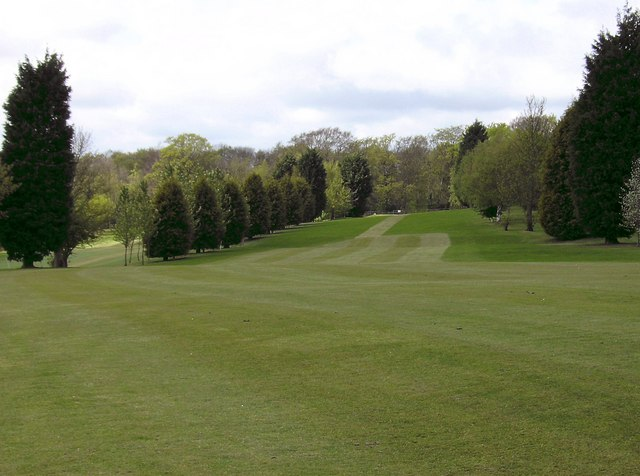
Louth Golf Course, Crowtree Lane

Louth also hosts Louth Cycle Club, Louth Swimming Club, Louth Old Boys (Football), Yom Chi Taekwondo, Kendojo Martial Arts, Louth Storm Basketball, Louth Chess Club, Louth Golf Course (Crowtree Lane) and Kenwick Park Golf Course (on the outskirts of the town) as well as archery, a model aircraft club which uses Strubby and Manby Airfields and a model radio controlled car club which uses Louth Tennis Centre.

== Media ==
Local news and television programmes is provided by BBC Yorkshire and Lincolnshire and ITV Yorkshire. Television signals are received from the Belmont TV transmitter. The town's local radio stations are BBC Radio Lincolnshire on 94.9 FM, Greatest Hits Radio Lincolnshire on 102.2 FM, DAB radio station, Hits Radio Lincolnshire and County Linx Radio, a community online station. Louth's local newspapers are the Louth Leader and Lincolnshire Echo.

== Education ==
=== Primary schools ===
- Kidgate Primary School
- Lacey Gardens Junior School
- St. Michael's C of E Primary School
- Eastfield Infants and Nursery School

=== Secondary schools ===
- King Edward VI Grammar School
- Cordeaux Academy (closed in 2017)
- Monks' Dyke Tennyson College (closed in 2017)

Both of the above merged to become:

- Louth Academy

=== Further education ===
A £3 million further education college, called Wolds College, was next to the Cordeaux School. Construction by the Lindum Group started in November 2007, and the college officially opened in October 2008. Unlike many Lincolnshire secondary modern schools, both Cordeaux and Monks' Dyke have their own sixth forms; East Lindsey's only other secondary modern with a sixth form is at Skegness. Although the town is well served for A-level provision, vocational courses were less well served until the college opened in this part of East Lindsey in September 2008, although there is the Grimsby Institute some fifteen miles (24 km) away.

== Twin town ==
Louth's twin town is La Ferté-Bernard, close to Le Mans in Pays de la Loire, France.

== Ludensians ==
Inhabitants of Louth are known as Ludensians, taken from the Latin name of the town (Lude, Luda).

- Ronni Ancona, comedian and actress, was born in the town.
- Jeffrey Archer was elected the town's Member of Parliament in a by-election in 1969. He stood down at the October 1974 general election.
- Jim Broadbent, actor, lives in a small village just outside Louth.
- Brigid Brophy, writer, lived in Louth for many years.
- Roy 'Chubby' Brown, adult comedian (whose real name is Royston Vasey), lives in nearby Fulstow.
- Ros Canter, Olympic equestrian, attended Kidgate Primary School and King Edward VI Grammar School in Louth.
- Leanda Cave, triathlete, was born in Louth
- Julie Christie, actress, has a home in Louth, and sometimes works with the local Film Club.
- George Davenport, Anglo/American frontiersman, US Army officer, was born in Louth.
- Barbara Dickson, singer and actress, lived in Louth.
- Corinne Drewery, lead singer of the band Swing Out Sister, attended schools in the town whilst growing up in the village of Authorpe, between Louth and Alford.
- Graham Fellows, also known as John Shuttleworth and Jilted John, singer-songwriter and comedian, lives in the town.
- Michael Foale, astronaut from the International Space Station, was born at Crowtree Lane Hospital, now the Humanities block of King Edward VI Grammar School. His father was stationed at a nearby Royal Air Force base at Manby.
- Dave Formula, member of New Wave pioneers Magazine, lives in Louth and often plays locally with other band The Finks.
- James Gillick, figurative artist, works from his studio in Louth and lives nearby.
- Ron Grant, former motorcycle road racer and tuner.
- Dan Haigh, bass guitarist in rock band Fightstar, born in Grimsby, was brought up near Louth.
- Simon Hanson, drummer with the band Squeeze, lived in Louth and attended King Edward VI school.
- Graham Higman (1917–2008), mathematician, was born in Louth.
- Augustus Charles Hobart-Hampden (1 April 1822 – 19 June 1886), English naval captain and Turkish admiral, was educated at King Edward VI Grammar School.
- Andreas Kalvos (1792 – 3 November 1869), Greek writer, lived in Louth from 1852 until his death. He was the first national Greek poet. In 1960, Greece's ambassador to the UK and Nobel Prize-winner for poetry, George Seferis, arranged for his remains to be reburied in Calvos' native Zakinthos.
- Rev. Thomas Kendall, incumbent of St. James Church, Louth and leader of the Lincolnshire Rising, 1 October 1536.
- Cate Kennedy, author
- Sir Michael Levey, art historian and director of the National Gallery from 1973 to 1986, lived in Louth from the late 1980s until his death in 2008.
- Thomas Louth, Lord Chief Justice of Ireland in the 1330s, was born in the town and took his surname from it.
- Matthew Macfadyen, actor, spent his childhood in the town.
- Harry Mallett, cricketer, was born in Louth.
- Patrick Mower, actor, currently seen in TV soap opera Emmerdale, lives in the area in Little Carlton.
- Philip Norton, Baron Norton of Louth (born 5 March 1951), leading expert on the British Parliament, Conservative politician, author and Professor of Politics at the University of Hull
- Jim Payne, professional golfer who won two European Tour tournaments.
- Adrian Royle, retired long-distance runner, lives in Louth.
- Ted Savage, footballer, was born in Louth.
- Edith Sharpley, Classical Lecturer at Newnham College, Cambridge, was born in Louth.
- Captain John Smith, English, soldier, sailor and founder of the Commonwealth of Virginia, although born in Willoughby, attended the King Edward VI Grammar School, where his name is adorned upon a tablet in the school's 'Edward Street Hall'. A cast-iron bust of him also stands within the school's canteen.
- Chris Staniland (1905–1942), racing driver and pilot, attended King Edward VI Grammar School. He raced cars successfully at Brooklands pre-war and by 1930 was chief test pilot for Fairey Aviation. He was killed in a crash on 26 June 1942 while testing a new aircraft and is buried in Keddington churchyard.
- Jessie Stephenson, Suffragette, organiser of 1911 census boycott.
- Stuart Storey, BBC sports commentator.
- Alfred, Lord Tennyson, was born in Somersby, between Louth and Horncastle, and was educated at King Edward VI Grammar School.
- Lieutenant Colonel Thomas Watson, recipient of the Victoria Cross, also educated at the King Edward VI Grammar
- Thomas Wilkinson Wallis, wood-carver, sculptor and artist, established his business in Louth.
- Graham Winteringham, architect, was born in Louth.
- Margaret Wintringham, first English woman to sit as an MP, lived most of her life just outside the town at Little Grimsby Hall, and was elected MP for Louth in 1920.
- Chris Wright, music industry executive, co-founder of Chrysalis Records, and television producer. Born in Louth and was educated at King Edward VI Grammar School.
- Robert Wyatt, English musician and former member of Soft Machine, now lives in Louth.

== Freedom ==
The following have received the Freedom of Louth.

- The College of Air Warfare Manby: 21 October 1965.

== Arms ==
Coat of arms of Louth Town Council

Notes
Granted to Louth Borough Council on 8 June 1954, transferred to the successor parish on 19 May 1976.
Escutcheon
Sable a wolf rampant Or on a chief of the last a plough turned to the sinister Azure between two garbs Gules.
Motto
Deo Adjuvante Non Timendum (With God's Assistance There Is Nothing To Fear)
