= Jonathan Hutton =

Jonathan Michael Hutton (born 1956) is a British-born Zimbabwean ecologist with broad interests in nature conservation and environmental policy whose views on the future of wildlife conservation in Africa have frequently been controversial.

Hutton was educated at Louth Grammar School and Jesus College, Cambridge, where he received an MA in Applied Biology in 1978. After graduation, he emigrated to Africa where, in 1984, his comprehensive study of the Nile crocodile and its ecology earned a DPhil degree from the University of Zimbabwe. For the next 10 years Hutton held various positions in the government of Zimbabwe including as Curator of Mammals at the National Museum and Senior Ecologist in the Department of National Parks and Wildlife Management. In 1994 he became a founder of the Africa Resources Trust (ART), an NGO that he directed from Harare, Zimbabwe, for the next decade. ART sought to strengthen the role of local communities in nature conservation by generating economic benefits from sustainable wildlife management – an approach to conservation that was not widely accepted at the time.

In 1998 Hutton was appointed Chair of the IUCN Sustainable Use Specialist Group which won a reputation for promoting innovative conservation strategies based on a cocktail of human rights and economic incentives. In 1999, following political difficulties in Zimbabwe, Hutton moved to the Department of Geography at the University of Cambridge where he contributed to a number of research topics including the management of global wildlife trade, the application of the Precautionary Principle in wildlife management and changing narratives in conservation. In 2003, he was asked by Fauna & Flora International (FFI) to expand its wildlife conservation activities in Africa, the success of which brought him to the attention of Klaus Toepfer, then Executive Director of United Nations Environment Programme (UNEP) based in Nairobi. Kenya. As a result, Hutton joined UNEP as Director of its World Conservation Monitoring Centre (UNEP-WCMC) which in recent years has achieved significant acclaim for the authoritative nature and impact of its work on biodiversity analysis and assessment. Since 2016, Hutton has been Director of the Luc Hoffmann Institute.

Hutton has received awards in recognition of his contribution to conservation. In 2005 he was elected a member of Hughes Hall at the University of Cambridge and in 2007 he was appointed Honorary Professor of Sustainable Resource Management at the University of Kent. He is married with 3 daughters.
