= Hugh Otter-Barry =

Ordinary of the Anglican Church (1887–1971)

Hugh Van Lynden Otter-Barry CBE (7 March 1887 – 9 May 1971), was the son of Isabel Louisa née Wolryche-Whitmore (1847–1905) and Robert Melvil Barry Otter, later Otter-Barry (1845–1917), and great-grandson of William Otter, Bishop of Chichester. He was Bishop of Mauritius from 1931 to 1959.

He was educated at Marlborough and Trinity College, Cambridge. Ordained in 1910 he was initially a Curate at St Luke's Church, Chelsea and then a missionary priest in Queensland. From 1919 until 1926 he was Vicar of Brill and then began a long period of service to Mauritius — firstly as its Archdeacon; and then from 1931 as its diocesan bishop. He was consecrated a bishop on St Barnabas' Day 1931 (11 June), by Cosmo Lang, Archbishop of Canterbury, at St Paul's Cathedral. He returned to England in 1959 where he continued to serve the Church as an Assistant Bishop within the Diocese of Peterborough until his death.

A primary school in Mauritius, in the town of Curepipe, close to Farquhar Street, is named after Otter-Barry.

Anglican Communion titles
Preceded by Cyril Golding-Bird	Bishop of Mauritius; 1931–1959	Succeeded by Alan Rogers
