= Denis Bryant =

Australian bishop (1918–2005)

Denis William Bryant DFC (31 January 1918 – 9 August 2005) was a Royal Air Force Officer and then an Anglican bishop in Australia in the third quarter of the 20th century.

== Early life ==
He was born on 31 January 1918, and educated at Cardiff University. His father Tom was a well-known harpist and kept the Carpenters' Arms public house in Efail Isaf.

== Air Force ==
Bryant served in the RAF both during the War and afterwards. In 1942 he was awarded the Distinguished Flying Cross. He was appointed Pilot Officer in 1943, Flying Officer in 1946 and Flight Lieutenant in 1948. He had a conversion experience whilst flying a plane, and proceeded to ordination.

== Church ==
After training for ordination at Queen’s College, Birmingham, Bryant was ordained in the Diocese of Guildford, as deacon in 1958 and priest in 1959. He served curacies at St Thomas-on-the-Bourne, Farnham, (1958-1960) and St Mary the Virgin, Cuddington, Worcester Park (1960-1961).

Having seen an advertisement in the church press for priests to serve in the remote and sparsely populated Australian Diocese of Kalgoorlie he became Rector of St Andrew's, Esperance (1961-1967). His new parish extended 200 miles north to south, and 65 east to west. During his incumbency, he replaced the galvanised iron church with a new building, which was opened in 1964. In 1966 he was additionally appointed as Archdeacon of the Goldfields.

He was consecrated a bishop on 30 November 1967 at St George's Cathedral, Perth, to become the 4th Bishop of Kalgoorlie. With closure of the goldfields, however, he realised that his diocese was no longer viable as a separate entity, and asked the Archbishop of Perth to reabsorb it, which occurred in 1973.

After merger, he then served in parish ministry in Perth as Rector of St John the Evangelist, Northam (1973–1975) and St Lawrence's, Dalkeith (1975–1985), as well as being an Assistant Bishop of Perth.

== Personal life ==
He was married to Linda, and had a daughter. They both predeceased him. He died in 2005, aged 87.

Anglican Communion titles
Preceded by Cecil Muschamp	Bishop of Kalgoorlie; 1967– 1972	See dissolved
