= Louth Academy =

Location
- Monks' Dyke Road; Louth, Lincolnshire, LN11 9AW; England; 53.3662°N 0.0043°E

Information
- Type: Academy
- Motto: Aspirational Education
- Established: September 1927
- Local authority: Lincolnshire
- Trust: Lincolnshire Gateway Academies Trust
- Department for Education URN: 144968 Tables
- Ofsted: Reports
- Principal: Philip Dickinson
- Gender: Co-educational
- Age: 11 to 16
- Houses: Perseus, Aquilla, Lyra, Vela
- Colours: Green and Blue
- Website: https://www.louthacademy.co.uk/

Louth Academy is a co-educational secondary school located in Louth in the English county of Lincolnshire.

== History ==
=== Formation ===
Monks' Dyke High School opened on Monks' Dyke Road in Louth in 1929. In September 2012 the school merged with Tennyson High School in Mablethorpe to form Monks' Dyke Tennyson College. The school continued to operate over both sites until August 2016 when the Mablethorpe site closed.

=== Tennyson Secondary School in Mablethorpe ===
In 1955, the new secondary modern school in Mablethorpe was to cost £88,000. Fuller plans were made in 1960. Construction started from May 1963.

The new headmaster from January 1965 would be Mr George Tebbutt, who was an English teacher at a Scunthorpe secondary modern school, since 1955, originally from Nottinghamshire. The school governors decided in March 1965 that the school should be called the Tennyson Secondary School.

The school opened in April 1965, with ten classrooms, and 4.5 acres of playing fields. It cost £141,000. There were 150 children at first, to be increased to 250. The poet John Betjeman would be asked to open the school. Lindsey Education Committee approved the name of the Tennyson Secondary School, later in 1965, and the Lord Tennyson would be asked to open the school.

The school would officially open on 18 November 1965. Tennyson's great grandson, Harold Tennyson, 4th Baron Tennyson, opened the school.

In the late 1960s there were plans for comprehensive schools. With the John Spendluffe school in Alford, it would become a three-form entry middle school. The Queen Elizabeth Alford school would be the comprehensive secondary school. People complained that it would mean the end of secondary education in Mablethorpe. Comprehensive education in nearby Grimsby would subsequently not work; the sixth forms had to be removed in 1990.

From the 1970s it known as Tennyson County Secondary. From 1992 it was known as the Tennyson High School.

In 2005 the school had the fifth-lowest GCSE results in England, with 10% gaining 5 good GCSEs. In 2006, neighbouring St Clement's College in Skegness had the third-lowest in England, with 4% gaining 5 good GCSEs. The Tennyson school had 8%.

The headteachers were –

- George Handley Tebbutt, died suddenly on 1 May 1980 aged 63, he lived in Sutton on Sea
- 1990s Mr Roger Kitching

=== Academy ===
Previously a foundation school administered by Lincolnshire County Council, in September 2017 Monks' Dyke Tennyson College converted to academy status and was renamed Louth Academy. The school is now sponsored by the Lincolnshire Gateway Academies Trust (formerly Tollbar Multi Academy Trust). At the same time Cordeaux Academy (located on North Holme Road in Louth) merged with the new Louth Academy. The school is now based over both sites.

As of 2022, Louth Academy has received a 'Good' rating from Ofsted after previously being 'Inadequate'.

Current principal is Mr Joe Hermiston.

== Notable former pupils ==
=== Monks’ Dyke ===
- Corinne Drewery
- Donald Pleasence
