= Brackenborough =

Village in Lincolnshire

Coordinates: 53.390484°N 0.006352°E

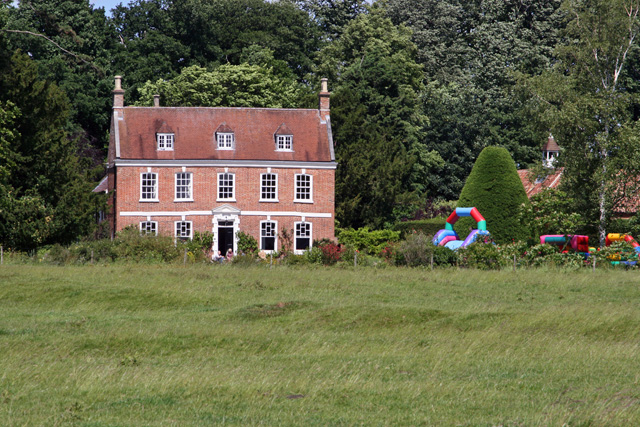
- Brackenborough Hall

- Location within Lincolnshire
- OS grid reference: TF335900
  - London: 130 mi (210 km) S
- Civil parish: Brackenborough with Little Grimsby
- District: East Lindsey
- Shire county: Lincolnshire
- Region: East Midlands
- Country: England
- Sovereign state: United Kingdom
- Post town: Louth
- Postcode district: LN11
- Police: Lincolnshire
- Fire: Lincolnshire
- Ambulance: East Midlands
- UK Parliament: Louth and Horncastle

Brackenborough is a hamlet in the civil parish of Brackenborough with Little Grimsby, in the East Lindsey district of Lincolnshire, England. It is situated approximately 2 miles (3 km) north from the town of Louth, and lies in the Lincolnshire Wolds, a designated Area of Outstanding Natural Beauty. In 1971 the parish had a population of 48. On 1 April 1987 the parish was abolished and merged with Little Grimsby to form "Brackenborough with Little Grimsby".

Listed in the 1086 Domesday Book with 15 households, Brackenborough is now a deserted medieval village with earthworks visible to the north and south-east of Brackenborough Hall.

Brackenborough Hall is a Grade II* listed building dating from the 17th century, with later alterations and additions, and built of red brick. It is likely that it replaced an older building, and according to Lincolnshire Archives it was referred to in 1856 as "an ancient moated farmhouse". The Coach House has been converted into holiday apartments. In the grounds of the Hall is a Grade II listed Folly dating from 1863, built for James Robson, using building material from nearby Fotherby church, which was demolished the same year. Restoration of the folly was completed in 2022.
