= William Elsey =

British Anglican bishop (1880–1966)

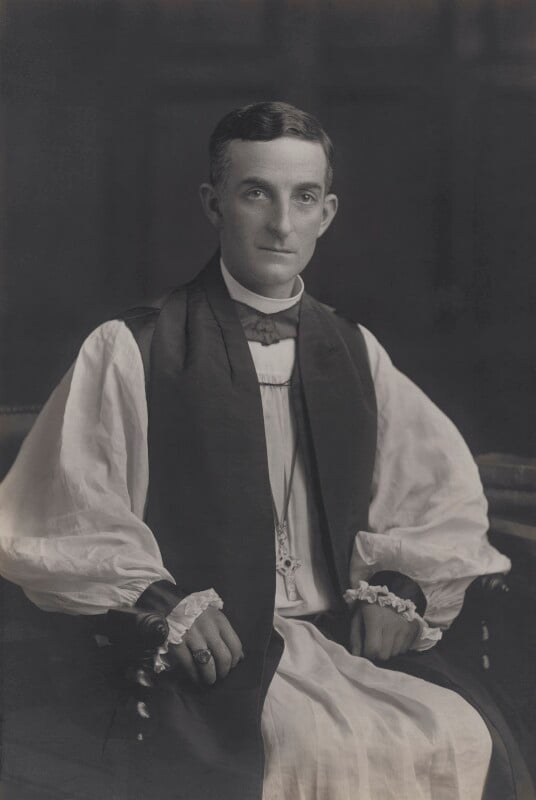
Elsey, c. 1920

William Edward Elsey (4 July 1880 – 25 September 1966) was a British Anglican priest who served as Bishop of Kalgoorlie from 1919 to 1950.

== Early life ==
Elsey was born into a sporting family on 4 July 1880 in Horncastle, Lincolnshire, England, and educated at King Edward VI Grammar School, Louth and Lincoln College, Oxford.

== Religious life ==
Ordained in 1905 Elsey was initially a curate at St Faith's Stepney and then its Priest in charge. In 1914 he began a long period of service overseas, firstly as a member of the Bush Brotherhood of St Boniface in the Anglican Diocese of Bunbury, Western Australia, then its Warden, following which he was elevated to the episcopate as Bishop of Kalgoorlie. During World War II, he was a chaplain to the Australian Armed Forces.

== Later life ==
Elsey retired in 1950 and died in Perth, Western Australia on 25 September 1966.

Church of England titles
Preceded by Cyril Henry Golding-Bird	Bishop of Kalgoorlie; 1919–1950	Succeeded by Cecil Emerson Barron Muschamp
