= Cyril Golding-Bird =

British-born Anglican bishop

The Right Reverend Cyril Golding-Bird
- Bishop of Mauritius
- Church: Anglican
- Diocese: Mauritius
- In office: 1919–1930
- Predecessor: Francis Gregory
- Successor: Hugh Otter-Barry
- Other posts: Bishop of Kalgoorlie, Australia (1914–1919); Assistant Bishop of Guildford (1930–d.); Archdeacon of Dorking (1930–1936); Archdeacon of Surrey (1936–1949)

Personal details
- Born: 18 September 1876 London
- Died: 9 April 1955 (aged 78)

Cyril Henry Golding-Bird (18 September 1876 – 9 April 1955) was an Anglican bishop in the early decades of the 20th century.

He was born on 18 September 1876 and educated at Merchant Taylors' and Lincoln College, Oxford. Ordained in 1897 he was initially a curate at All Saints, Margaret Street in London and then a missionary priest in South Africa.

After time as vicar of St Barnabas', Dover, he began a long period of service overseas: first as dean of the Falkland Islands; then a similar post in Newcastle, New South Wales following which he was ordained to the episcopate as Bishop of Kalgoorlie.

Translated to Mauritius in 1919, he returned to England eleven years later to become an Assistant Bishop of Guildford and Archdeacon of Dorking, then of Surrey, until his final resignation in 1949, before his death on 9 April 1955.

Anglican Communion titles
New title	Bishop of Kalgoorlie; 1914–1919	Succeeded by William Elsey
Preceded by Francis Gregory	Bishop of Mauritius; 1919–1930	Succeeded by Hugh Otter-Barry
