= Francis Gregory (bishop) =

British-born Anglican bishop (1848–1927)

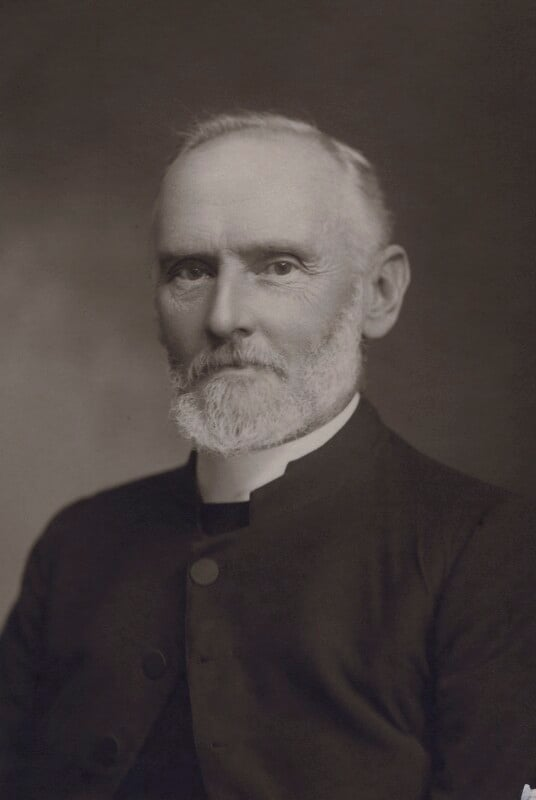
Gregory, c. 1905

The Rt Rev Francis Ambrose Gregory (1848 - 31 January 1927) was the Bishop of Mauritius from 1904 to 1919.

Born into an ecclesiastical family in 1848 and educated at Trinity College, Glenalmond and Corpus Christi College, Oxford, he was ordained in 1873 and began his career as a Curate in Cheam. After that he was a SPG Missionary in Madagascar. In time he became the Principal of St Paul’s College, Ambatoharanana and Chaplain to the Bishop. He was Bishop of Mauritius from 1904 to 1919.

He died on 31 January 1927 and is buried at Northiam Cemetery, East Sussex.

== Notes ==
Church of England titles
Preceded by Walter Ruthven Pym	Bishop of Mauritius; 1904 – 1919	Succeeded by Cyril Henry Golding-Bird
