= Wolds College =

Location
- North Holme Road; Louth, Lincolnshire, LN11 0HG; England; 53.37347°N 0.00292°W

Information
- Type: FE college
- Established: 2008
- Closed: September 2012
- Local authority: Lincolnshire
- Gender: Coeducation
- Age: 16+
- Website: http://www.woldscollege.ac.uk

The Wolds College was a further education college based in Louth, Lincolnshire.

== History ==
It was built from November 2007 next door to Cordeaux School. The East Lindsey district, which has a larger geographic area than Buckinghamshire and Surrey, previously had no dedicated further education colleges for vocational courses. Certainly the Louth part of the district had nothing of that nature, however both secondary modern schools (Cordeaux and Monks Dyke) have sixth forms. The Skegness area has had a small facility (the Skegness Academy) that runs FE courses, although with a restricted choice. It filled a large educational gap. It opened in October 2008. It cost £3m. It was designed by Mouchel and built by Lindum Construction.

It was officially opened by Princess Anne on 2 December 2008. It was named after the Lincolnshire Wolds.

== Closure ==
In September 2012 The Wolds College merged with Cordeaux School and in January 2013 became part of Cordeaux Academy under The Academies Enterprise Trust. Cordeaux Academy's Sixth Form was moved into the space vacated by the area used for hair and beauty. Cordeaux Academy was taken over by Tollbar MAT in September 2017 and Renamed Louth Academy North. At this point all post 16 education was removed from the former college. The building is now used as an extension of the main Louth Academy North building.

== Range of courses ==
As well as more general range of courses, such as travel/tourism and computing, involving written work, there are three main areas of practical study.

=== Construction ===
This covers bricklaying, painting and decorating, plastering and plumbing. Teaching is provided by Build A Future.

=== Motor Vehicle engineering ===
Courses in how to service and repair motor vehicles are provided by staff from Cordeaux Academy.

=== Hair and Beauty ===
Until September 2012 the college provided courses covering hairdressing (in collaboration with Wella), beauty therapy, nail care services and holistic therapy. Teaching was provided by Grimsby Institute.

== See also ==
- Grimsby Institute of Further & Higher Education
