= Cordeaux Academy =

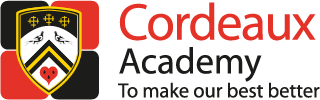
- School Logo

Location
- North Holme Road; Louth, Lincolnshire, LN11 0HG; England; 53°22′24″N 0°00′10″W

Information
- Type: Academy
- Motto: To Make Our Best Better
- Established: 1956
- Closed: 2017
- Department for Education URN: 139055 Tables
- Ofsted: Reports
- Headteacher: Patrick Daley
- Gender: Coeducational
- Age: 11 to 18
- Enrolment: 584
- Colour
- Website: http://www.cordeauxacademy.org/ (No Longer In Service)

Cordeaux Academy (formerly Cordeaux School) was a coeducational secondary school and sixth form with academy status, located on North Holme Road in Louth, Lincolnshire, England.

Cordeaux educated pupils aged 11 to 18. Its size was a smaller than average, in an area where there are selective grammar schools. It had 550 pupils of whom 70 where in the Sixth form. It employed 39 teachers, and support, technical and administrative staff. The school had 26 feeder schools from the surrounding area, and its partner secondary school was King Edward VI Grammar School, the local Grammar School. Over 50% of Cordeaux's pupils traveled to school by bus from outlying areas.

On 20 June 2017, it was announced that Cordeaux Academy would transfer academy sponsorship from The Academies Enterprise Trust to The Tollbar Multi Academy Trust (Tollbar MAT) from September 2017 at a request from the Regional Schools Commissioner. Cordeaux Academy joined with the former Monks Dyke Tennyson College under Tollbar MAT during the 2017/2018 to create a single Louth Academy split across two sites. The former Cordeaux site is now known as Louth Academy Lower Campus for the lower school (years 7 & 8) with the former MTDC site known as Louth Academy Upper Campus for the upper years (9,10,11,6 form). Tollbar MAT currently is the sponsor of Tollbar Academy in New Waltham, Grimsby along with several other Secondary and Primary Academies in the Lincolnshire area.

== History ==
The school is named after Captain Edward Cawdron Cordeaux, D.S.O., O.B.E., R.N., (born 24 July 1894, Caistor), a surgeon who lived at Goulceby House, Goulceby. He reached the rank of Commander in the Royal Navy in 1934, when he left the Navy, then the rank of Captain in 1940 in the Second World War. He became High Sheriff of Lincolnshire in 1963 but died on 8 June 1963.

Cordeaux School first opened to the public in September 1956, being officially opened on 10 October 1957 as High Holme Road Secondary School. This name remained until 1965 when it became Cordeaux High School, then later, Cordeaux School.

The School gained Special Engineering College status in 2004 and is currently in a partnership with Siemens.

In September 2011 it was announced that Cordeaux School and the adjacent Wolds College would join with Monks' Dyke Technology College and Tennyson High School in Mablethorpe to form one single organisation under the Local Authority. The option of becoming an Academy was rejected. However the school converted to academy status in January 2013, and was renamed Cordeaux Academy. It is now part of the Academies Enterprise Trust.

== Facilities ==
The school site had a range of facilities that includes playing fields, sports hall, gym, music and practice rooms, Design and Technology areas, 6 science laboratories, a Learning Support Department, and a temporary sixth form block. Improvements to facilities included a refurbished science laboratory, food technology and art rooms, and the installation of modern CAD/CAM and engineering equipment. There had been investment in, and school-wide access to, ICT, the school having two specialist ITC classrooms.
