= Brackenborough with Little Grimsby =

Civil parish in the East Lindsey district of Lincolnshire, England

Coordinates: 53.40°N 0.00°E

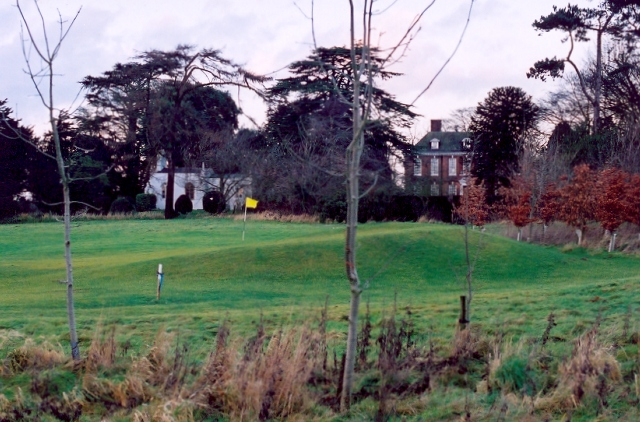
- Little Grimsby

- Location within Lincolnshire
- Population: 78 (2001 census)
- Civil parish: Brackenborough with Little Grimsby
- District: East Lindsey
- Shire county: Lincolnshire
- Region: East Midlands
- Country: England
- Sovereign state: United Kingdom

Brackenborough with Little Grimsby is a civil parish in the East Lindsey district of Lincolnshire, England.

According to the 2001 census, the parish had a population of 78. The parish was formed on 1 April 1987 from "Brackenborough" and "Little Grimsby".
