= Grimsby Institute of Further & Higher Education =

Grimsby Institute and University Centre Grimsby
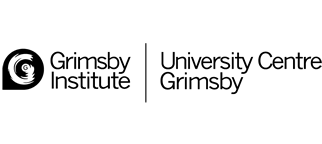

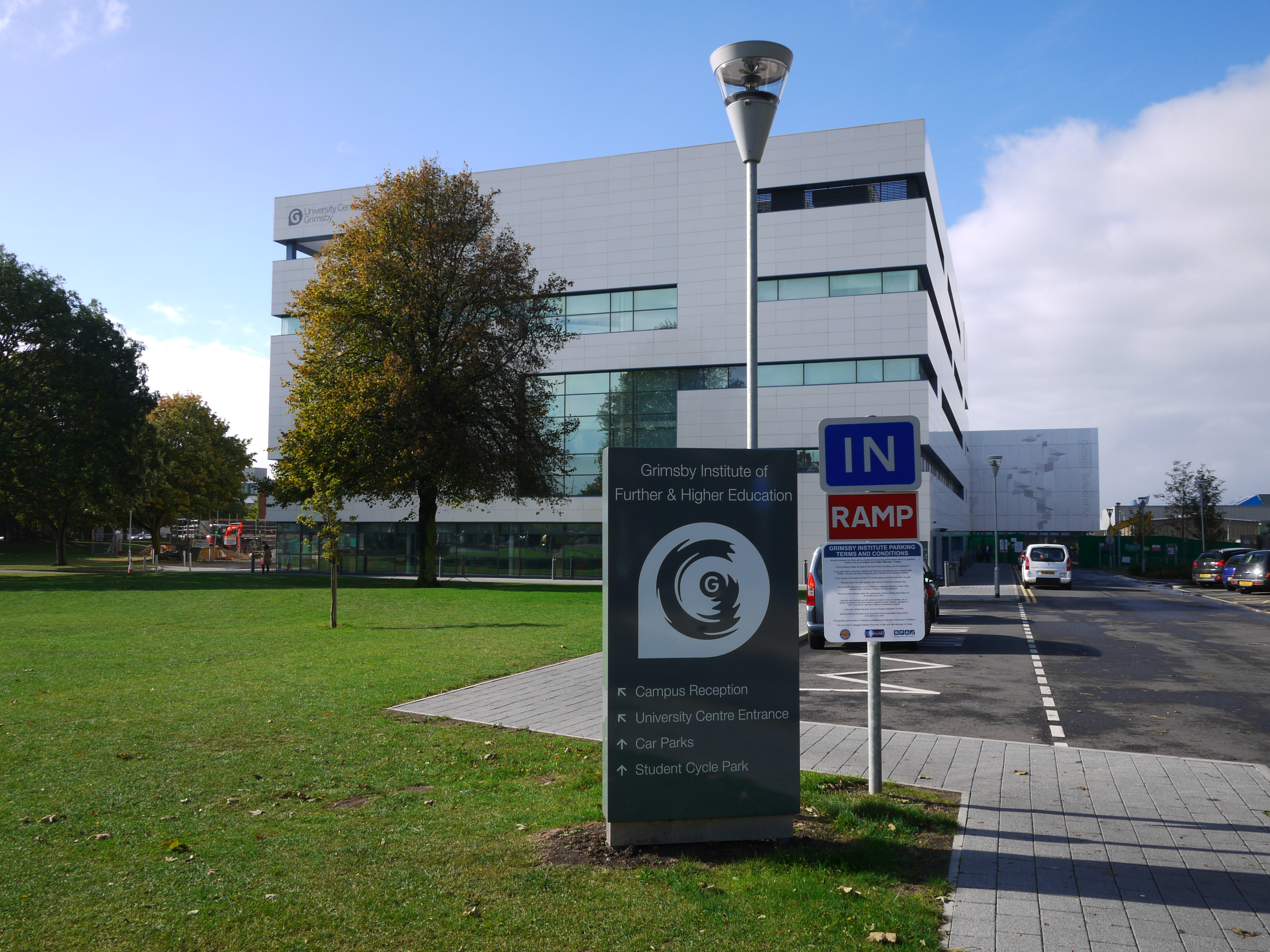

Location
- Nuns Corner; Grimsby, Lincolnshire, DN34 5BQ; England; 53°33′10″N 0°05′38″W

Information
- Type: Further Education and University Centre
- Established: 1944; 82 years ago
- Local authority: North East Lincolnshire
- Department for Education URN: 130585 Tables
- Ofsted: Reports
- Principal: Ann Hardy
- Gender: Co-educational
- Age: 14+
- Enrolment: c. 17,000 students (2019/20)
- Website: grimsby.ac.uk

Grimsby Institute of Further & Higher Education and University Centre Grimsby (often Grimsby Institute or GIFHE or Grimsby College or UCG) is a further education and higher education college in Grimsby in North East Lincolnshire in England.

Grimsby Institute of Further & Higher Education is one of England’s largest providers of further and higher education. The college specialises in vocational education and provides a range of training course in further education, higher education, apprenticeships and adult training courses across multiple campuses and consists of multiple brands including The Academy Grimsby (TAG), Career 6, Workforce Skills, Skegness TEC, and National Employer Training (NET).

Grimsby Institute of Further & Higher Education is part of the TEC Partnership, one of the largest education, training and employability organisations in the UK. On 4 May 2017, Ofsted graded the college as 'Outstanding'.

On 14th August 2026 the TEC Partnership was issued a "Notice to improve" by the Department for Education.

== History ==
=== Grimsby College of Further Education ===
It was known as Grimsby Technical College in the 1950s, administered by the County Borough of Grimsby Education Committee, becoming Grimsby College of Further Education in the 1960s, offering three-year HNDs (a higher education qualification) in food science, and also applied chemistry. It was based at Nuns Corner. The food science course involved six months of teaching and six months in industry per year. In 1966 it became Grimsby College of Technology, and was heavily involved with training people for food science careers; which was of considerable importance to the economy of Grimsby.

=== Grimsby College of Technology ===
By 1967 it was also offering HNDs in Refrigeration Engineering, Analytical Chemistry and Chemical Engineering. Refrigeration was taught on a site on Weelsby Street. It also offered courses in training for the British Merchant Navy. It hosted food science conferences. By 1968 it was also offering HNDs in Business Studies and Mechanical Engineering (refrigeration or environmental). Its departments included:

- Food and Fashion
- Science and Mathematics
- Engineering
- Management and Business Studies.
- School of Art
- Maritime Studies and Fisheries
- Building
- General Studies (the humanities)
- Grimsby School of Nursing

By the early 1970s it was offering four HNDs – Business, Refrigeration Engineering, Food Technology, and Food Science (Applied Chemistry). Its HNC courses also were food or chemical industry based, to train technicians. By 1972 it had a department of Science and Food Technology, as well as Food and Fashion (which looked at catering qualifications, not the chemistry involved). In 1973 it was offering an Applied Biology HND (with options of Nutrition and Biochemistry). In April 1974 administration transferred to Humberside Education Committee, and more HNDs (briefly) included Data Processing and Marketing and Advertising.

By 1989 more arts courses were being offered than science, so the college name became Grimsby College of Technology & Arts (GCTA), then just Grimsby College in 1993. In 2004 in its 60th anniversary year, it became Grimsby Institute.

=== Connections with Humberside University ===
By September 1982 it was offering its same set of four food-industry-related HND through Hull College of HE on Inglemore Avenue in Hull. On 1 January 1983, the Humberside College of HE came into existence, through integrating Grimsby's HND courses with the Hull College of HE. At this point, it was becoming a full-fledged HE college. On 11 June 1990, the HE College, at Hull, became Humberside Polytechnic. Three of its thirteen sites were in Grimsby (its food and fisheries site), one being the College of Technology's food-industry-related HE courses. The plan was to reduce the number of sites to four by the mid-1990s: three in Hull and one in Grimsby. The grand plans and vision for expansion of the polytechnic extended as far as Lincoln, York and Scarborough. This would almost actually happen: except (conversely) Lincoln would be the centre, extending as far north as Hull; Grimsby would be jettisoned.

The former Humberside Polytechnic, which became the University of Humberside in 1992 (and essentially closed down in Hull when it became the University of Lincoln in 2002), had its Food, Fisheries and Environmental Studies site adjacent to Grimsby College on Bargate, which became the School of Applied Science and Technology with around 500 students. It offered BSc courses in Food Science. It offered a similar range of courses to that of the University of Lincoln's current site in Holbeach.

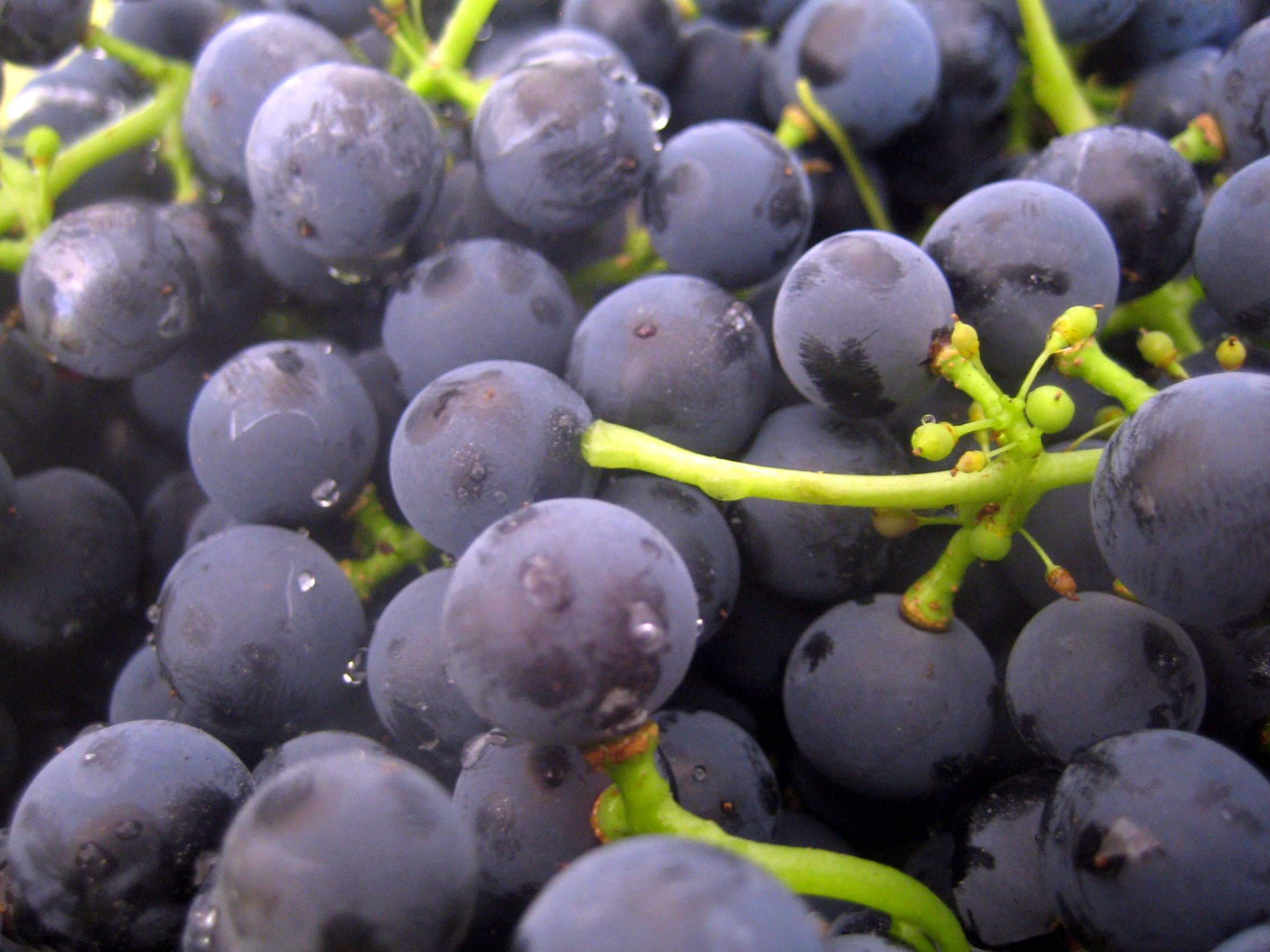
In the 1990s it offered HNDs in wine-making (oenology)

Grimsby College, as it was known from 1993, was known as an 'Associate College' of the University of Humberside, and offered a wide range of HNDs, not its former range of food-industry courses, although it even offered an HND in Viticulture and Vinification, which became the UK's first degree course in Oenology (wine-making) in 1994, run by Mike Grubb. It offered a Sports Science HND through Nottingham Trent University. The type of degree courses it offered were social science, business, humanities, and marketing & tourism. The former food department was not part of the college.

In 1999 it began to offer Broadcast Journalism and Media Production courses, and in 2000 it branched out to ECE Television, which became East Coast Media, which worked with GTV (owned by Granada).

In 2015, The Media Production Course was renamed from East Coast Media to Estuary Student TV. This was to reflect on the Estuary TV brand which is the Local Television Channel owned by the Grimsby Institute.

=== Higher education college ===
In 2004 it became the Grimsby Institute of Further & Higher Education. Its connection (associate college status) with the former University of Lincolnshire and Humberside (formed in 1996) finished when this changed its name to the University of Lincoln in 2002, which rapidly closed most of its main Hull site down (now occupied by the Hull York Medical School), concentrating it all in Lincoln. Grimsby Institute was now separate from any partner university.

In 2006 it sponsored the Pyewipe roundabout on the A180.

The Humber Food School was moved from Grimsby to Lincoln. The Food Refrigeration and Process Engineering Research Centre (FRPERC) moved to the College in August 2009. Ray Ellis took over as acting principal from Professor Daniel Khan OBE in February 2010, who had been there for nine years. In July 2010 the Institute announced that Sue Middlehurst had accepted the post of Principal.

== Campuses ==
The main site is situated at the junction of the A1243 and A46, just north of the Diana, Princess of Wales Hospital.

=== Main campus ===
The Institute's main campus is at Nuns Corner in Grimsby, and it has 8 branch sites. In 2019 the Institute had around 16,000 students. The site has its own nursery, theatre, campus shop, multi-use games area, and fitness suite.

=== Other sites ===
- The Academy Grimsby or TAG (formerly East Coast School of Art and Design and Grimsby Art College) is a school for 14-16 year-olds on Westward Ho, next to Ormiston Maritime Academy and Franklin College.
- The Nunsthorpe Community Campus is in Nunsthorpe and offers animal care and horticulture further education and training courses.
- Skegness TEC (formerly Lincolnshire Regional College) on Heath Road in Skegness offers a range of vocational and employability further education and training courses.
- Grimsby Learning Centre on Osborne Street, Grimsby offers a range of adult training courses and employability training.
- Doncaster Learning Centre on Frances Street, Doncaster offers a range of adult training courses and employability training.
- Humber Maritime College on Middleplatt Road, Immingham offers sea cadets and maritime education and training.
- Louth Learning Centre on Mercer Row, Louth offers a range of adult training courses and employability training.
- Immingham Learning Centre on Pelham Road, Immingham offers a range of adult training courses and employability training.

== Higher education ==
The Grimsby Institute has a long tradition of delivering higher education courses. It is one of the largest college-based higher education providers in England. The college has held Foundation Degree Awarding Powers since 2013, and Bachelors Degree Awarding Powers since 2021. The college was rated Silver in TEF 2023.

The Grimsby Institute's higher education degrees are validated using its own Degree Awarding Powers (TEC Partnership), or by the University of Hull.

== Notable alumni ==
- Maxine Carr, partner and accomplice of child murderer Ian Huntley
- Keeley Donovan, journalist and broadcaster
- Thomas Turgoose, actor
- Martin Vickers, politician and MP
- Tom Marsters, the King's Representative to the Cook Islands

=== Grimsby School of Art ===
- Jane Andrews, murderer and former aide to the Duchess of York.
- Richard Barnbrook, artist, filmmaker and former BNP member of the London Assembly
- John Hurt, actor
- Reham Khan, journalist
- Susanne Osbourne, artist and designer, wife of singer Stuart A. Staples.
