= King Edward VI Grammar School, Louth =

King Edward VI Grammar School

Location
- Edward Street; Louth, Lincolnshire, LN11 9LL; England
- 53°21′49″N 0°00′35″W

Information
- Type: Grammar school; Academy
- Motto: "Dieu Et Mon Droit"
- Established: 1276; 750 years ago
- Founder: Edward VI
- Local authority: Lincolnshire
- Department for Education URN: 142262 Tables
- Ofsted: Reports
- Head teacher: Samantha Cassidy
- Gender: Coeducational
- Age: 11 to 18 (Sixth Form)
- Enrolment: 1036
- Houses: Tennyson, Hobart, Franklin, Masson, Baron (previously Smith)
- Colours: Red and Blue
- Alumni: Old Ludensians
- Website: http://www.kevigs.org

King Edward VI Grammar School (sometimes abbreviated to KEVIGS) is a grammar school located in Louth, Lincolnshire, England.

== History ==
As early as the 8th century schooling was available at Louth, but the oldest reference to a school is in a passage by Simon de Luda, the town's schoolmaster, in 1276.

The dissolution of the monasteries in 1548 placed the future of education in Louth at risk. Leading figures in the local community petitioned the King, Edward VI, to secure the school's future, and on 21 September 1551 the school was given a plot of land and money raised from three fairs by the king, which was administered by a Foundation which still exists today. In 1564, Elizabeth I granted the manor of Louth and some additional property to support the school.

Until 1964 King Edward's was a boys' school. In 1903 a girls' boarding school for 400 pupils was established nearby in Westgate House on Westgate, which became King Edward VI Girls' Grammar School. Both schools amalgamated in 1965 when administered by the Lindsey County Council Education Committee. Between 1968 and 1997, the school was for 14-18 year old pupils only, with the majority of entrants transferring from 3 local high schools. Although the school was selective for 14-16 year olds during this time, the school was called "King Edward VI School" (sometimes abbreviated to "KEVIS").

School male boarders lived at The Lodge on Edward Street until 1971, afterwards at The Sycamores on Westgate, and later at an old maternity hospital on Crowtree Lane next to the main school building. Girls boarded at Masson House and The Limes houses on Westgate.

In 2007 the school made the news after agreeing to pay a former teacher £625,000 - the largest ever teacher compensation package - following a 3-year battle by teachers' union NASUWT, after he was permanently crippled by an electric shock caused by faulty wiring in a science lab.

In February 2024, the school was back in the news when teachers went on strike over adverse management practices, which they claimed were leaving them "exhausted and stressed". A resolution was reached after one day of industrial action.

Previously a foundation school administered by Lincolnshire County Council, King Edward VI Grammar School converted to academy status in September 2015. However the school continues to coordinate with Lincolnshire County Council for admissions.

In 2022, completion of the new sports hall was done. The new facility provides 4 changing rooms, a fitness suite and a dance studio. There is the main hall as well.

At the start of the academic year 2025–2026, the school renovated the library building with funding from the will and last testament of former headteacher of the Girls' school, Christine Wilkinson.

== Admissions ==
Pupils pass the 11-plus examination to attend the school, and many come from satellite villages surrounding it.

== Notable former pupils ==
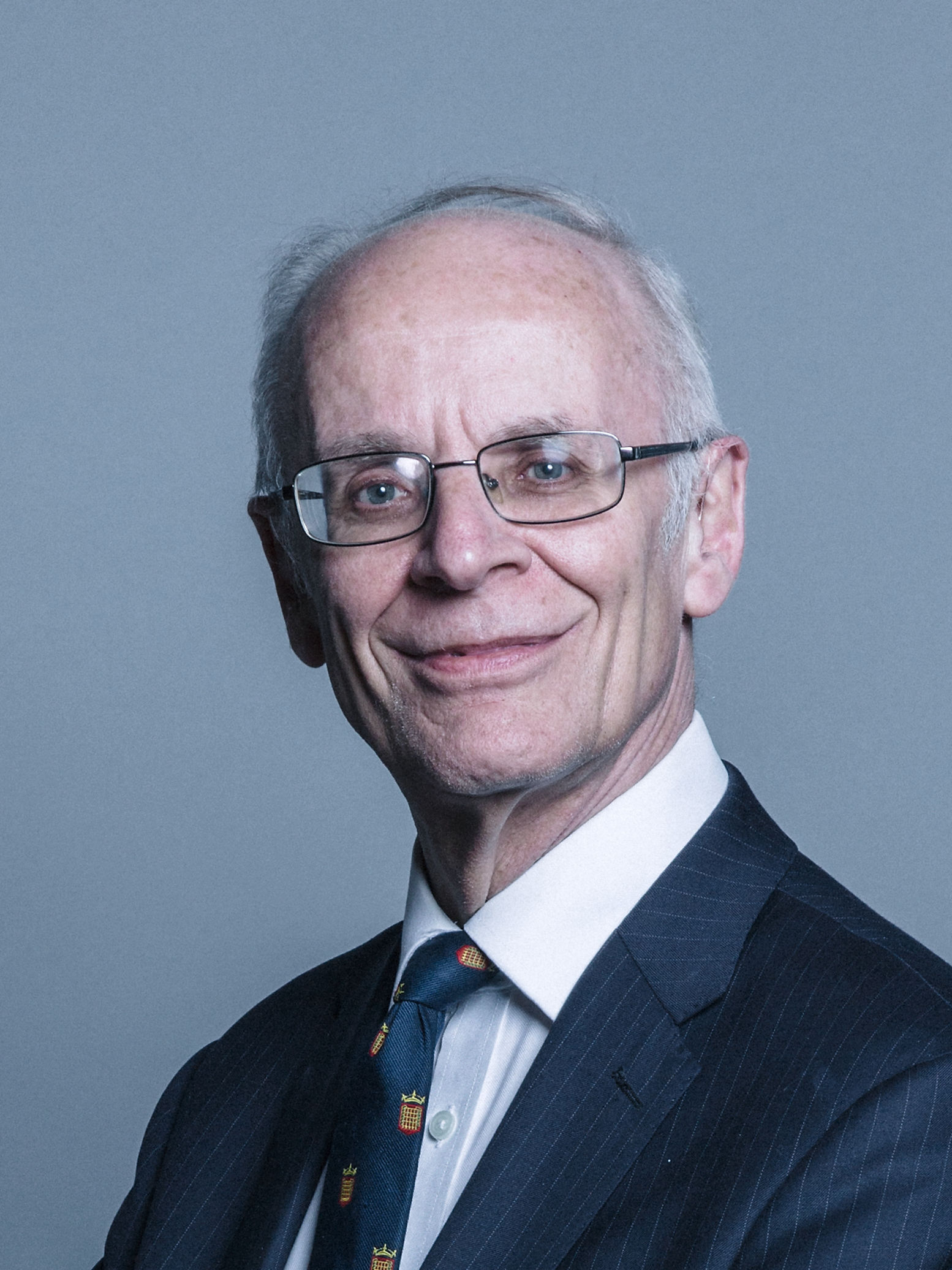
Philip Norton in March 2018

- Rt Rev William Elsey, Bishop of Kalgoorlie from 1919 to 50
- Edward John Eyre (5 August 1815 – 30 November 1901), explorer of the Australian continent and Governor of Jamaica
- Andrew Faulds, Labour MP from 1966 to 1974 for Smethwick, and from 1974 to 1997 for Warley East
- Frederick Flowers
- Sir John Franklin, author and explorer, who attended from 1797 to 1800
- Rt Rev Field Flowers Goe, Bishop of Melbourne from 1887 to 1901
- Simon Hanson, drummer with the band Squeeze
- Tom Hood, playwright
- Francis Hopwood, 1st Baron Southborough CMG CB
- Jonathan Hutton, ecologist, executive director of WWF International Global Conservation
- Christopher Maltman, opera singer
- Robert Mapletoft, master from 1664 to 1677 of Pembroke College, Cambridge
- Nathan McCree, music producer and composer of the original Tomb Raider game music
- Philip Norton, Baron Norton of Louth, Professor of Government since 1986 at the University of Hull
- Rowland Parker, historian
- Captain John Smith, a mercenary and the first elected president of Virginia, famous for his supposed relations with Pocahontas, attended from 1592 to 1595
- George Storer, Conservative MP from 1874 to 1885 for South Nottinghamshire
- Charles Heathcote Tatham, (1772–1842) architect
- Alfred, Lord Tennyson, poet, who attended from 1816 to 1820
- Lieutenant Colonel Thomas Watson VC

== Previous Headteachers ==
- Rev. John Waite (1814–1851)
- Rev. Charles Badham (1851–1853)
- Rev. Arthur Macleane (1853–1858)
- Herbert Branston Gray (1878–1880)
- Mungo Travers Park (1880–1884)
- William Walter Hopwood (1885–1900)
- Arthur H. Worrell (1900–1911)
- S.R. Unwin (1911–1917)
- E.A. Gardiner (1917–1941)
- Hedley Warr (1941–1958)
- Donald Witney (1958–1981)
- John Haden (1982–1992)
- James Wheeldon (1992–2006)
- Claire Hewitt (2006–2008)
- James Lascelles (2009–2024)
- Samantha Cassidy (2024–Present)

== See also ==
- List of the oldest schools in the United Kingdom
