= Anglican Diocese of Kalgoorlie =

Anglican diocese in Western Australia

Diocese of Kalgoorlie
- Coat of arms

Location
- Country: Australia
- Territory: Goldfields-Esperance; (Southern part)
- Ecclesiastical province: Western Australia
- Metropolitan: Archbishop of Perth
- Coordinates: 30°44′40.9″S 121°28′23.0″E

Information
- Denomination: Anglicanism
- Established: 1914
- Dissolved: 1973
- Cathedral: St John the Baptist, Kalgoorlie
- Parent church: Church of England in Australia

The Diocese of Kalgoorlie was a diocese of the Church of England in Australia (now the Anglican Church of Australia). It covered much of the Goldfields-Esperance region in Western Australia, and existed from the consecration of its first bishop in 1914 until its re-absorption back into the Anglican Diocese of Perth in 1973. At that point the Kalgoorlie diocese was reported to contain only eight parishes, and was financially unviable as a separate entity.

The cathedral was St John the Baptist, Kalgoorlie, which before and after the separate existence of the diocese was the parish church of Kalgoorlie.

== Bishops ==
Tenure	Name	Notes
1914–1919	Cyril Golding-Bird	First diocesan bishop.
1919–1950	William Elsey	
1950–1967	Cecil Muschamp	
1967–1973	Denis Bryant	Fourth and final diocesan bishop; later Assistant Bishop of Perth.
