= Alvingham Priory =

Priory in Lincolnshire, England

The Priory of Saint Mary the Virgin Alvingham
- Location within Lincolnshire
- Interactive map of The Priory of Saint Mary the Virgin Alvingham

Monastery information
- Order: Gilbertine
- Established: 1141
- Disestablished: 29 September 1538
- Mother house: Sempringham Priory
- Dedication: Saint Mary
- Diocese: Lincoln

People
- Founders: Hugh de Scotney, William Friston, Hamelin Alvingham

Architecture
- Functional status: Dissolved
- Groundbreaking: 1148
- Completion date: 1154

Site
- Location: Alvingham, Lincolnshire, England
- Coordinates: 53.40175°N 0.05614°E
- Visible remains: some ruins and a chapel

Alvingham Priory was a Gilbertine priory in St. Mary, Alvingham, Lincolnshire, England. The Priory, established between 1148 and 1154, was a "double house", where religious of both sexes lived in two separate monasteries. They did not commonly communicate with one another, and there was an internal wall dividing their priory church. The superior of every Gilbertine house was the prioress, the prior being really an official of her house.

The priory has left few visible remains. However, although the priory church has not survived, there are two churches within the priory's former precinct, both of which are pre-Reformation structures and appear to have been founded by the Anglo-Saxons. St Adelwold's church (the parish church of Alvingham) is the only church in England which is dedicated to St. Adelwold. St Mary's Church was originally a chapel belonging to the priory. It became the parish church of North Cockerington at the dissolution and is now under the care of the Churches Conservation Trust.

The cartulary of the priory is preserved at the Bodleian Library. The priory was active until most of its inhabitants died from the Black Death. Men and women continued to join the house until the sixteenth century when all the monasteries of the Gilbertine Order were dissolved. Following the surrender of the house on 29 September 1538 pensions were paid to twenty people: a prior, seven canons, a prioress and eleven nuns.

== Geography ==
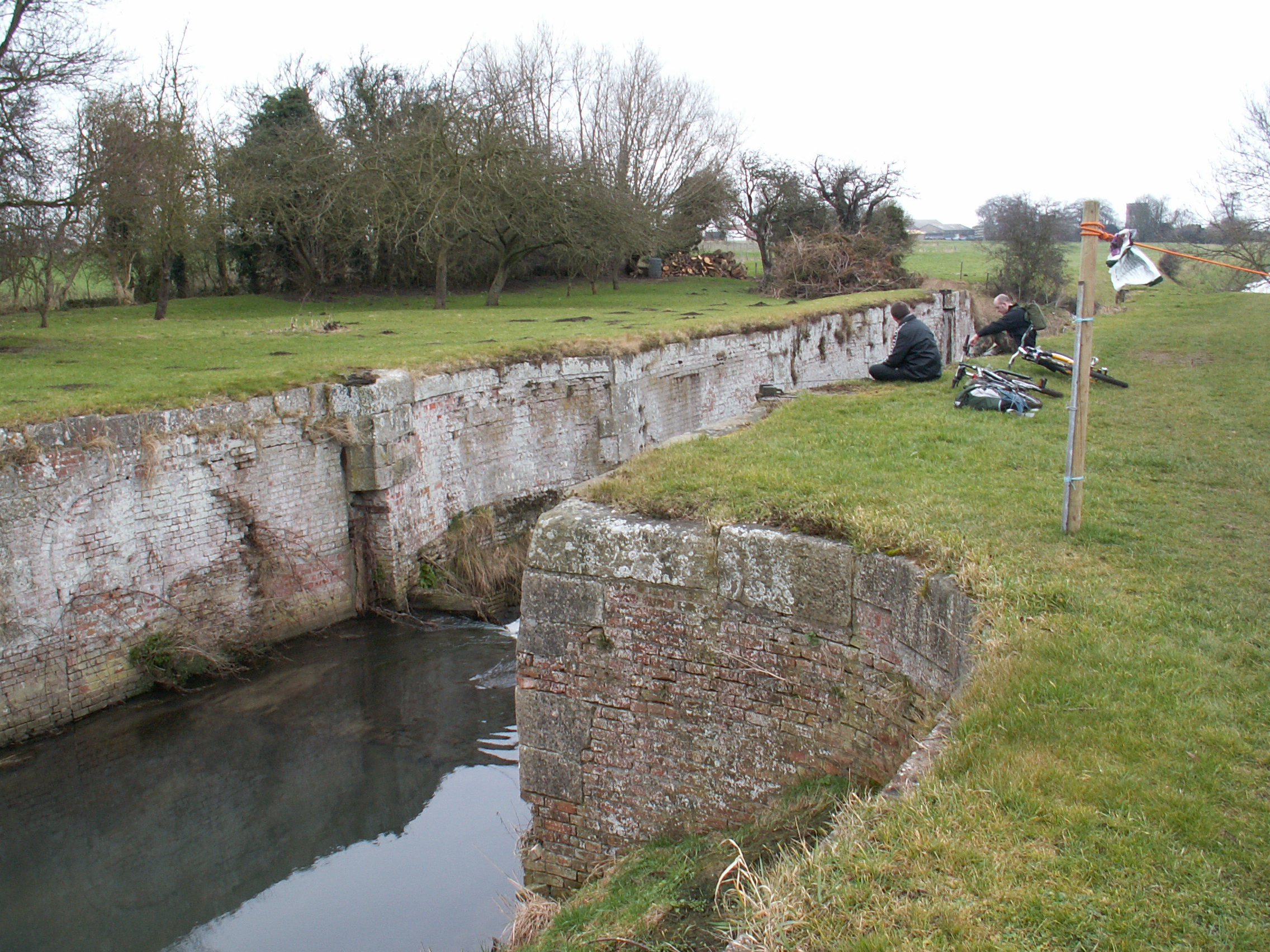
Remains of a lock at Alvingham

Alvingham Priory was located until its dissolution in Alvingham village. The village is mentioned in the Domesday Book (Aluingeham, meaning "Homestead of the Ælfingas (the tribe of Ælf)".). The village is surrounded by agricultural land, and lies on a small back road leading east out of Louth, Lincolnshire, called Alvingham Road. In the eighteenth century, a canal, the Louth Navigation, was constructed near the priory site: it survives as a drainage system.

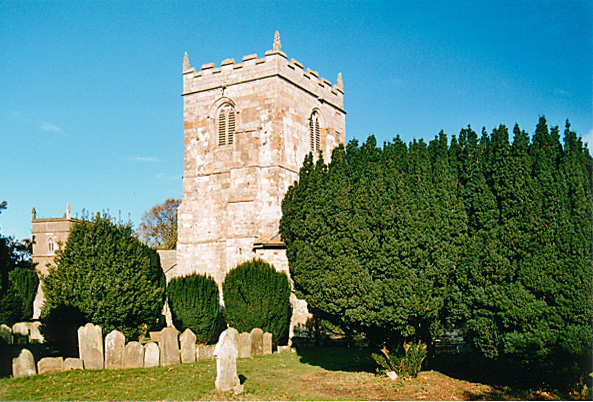
Alvingham churchyard with its two churches

== History ==
12th century

The Gilbertine priory of St. Mary, Alvingham, was founded as a double house between 1148 and 1154, possibly by Hugh de Scotney or one of his tenants. The founders were possibly Hugh de Scotney or William Friston Another possible co-founder was Hamelin Alvingham (known as Hamelin the Dean) who made substantial land donations to Alvingham Priory. He is known to have resigned from his deanery and joined Alvingham Priory as a canon (monk). The monks wore black, with white cloaks, and generally were shaven.

In a few years the convent possessed lands in Alvingham, Cockerington, and Calthorp, and the churches of St. Adelwold, Alvingham, and St. Mary, Cockerington, which stood in the same churchyard, within the precinct of the priory, and the churches of St. Leonard, Cockerington, Cawthorpe, Keddington, and Newton. Hamelin, the dean, gave three parts of the church of St. Adelwold of Alvingham, the fourth part having been given by Roger Fitz Gocelyn. In view of this endowment, St. Gilbert limited the number of inmates to eighty nuns and lay sisters, and forty canons and lay brothers.

A wise compact with the neighbouring Cistercians' house of Louth Park in 1174 provided against that most fruitful source of strife, the acquisition of lands. It was agreed that neither house should hire nor acquire for a price cultivated or uncultivated lands without the consent and advice of the other. If the convent of Louth Park broke the contract the convent of Alvingham could take a third of the land for a third of the price paid. On the other hand, the convent of Louth Park could take two-thirds of the land of Alvingham for two-thirds of the price. The pact was to be kept in twenty townships in Lincolnshire.

13th century

In 1232 the priory was extended by purchasing part of the manor of Alvingham from John de Melsa. Prior to 1251 the priory and convent had granges at Alvingham, Cockerington, Grainthorpe, Keddington, Newton, Cabourne, Coningsby, and Swinfleet and various houses in Lincoln, Louth, Boston, and Great Grimsby. Before 1251 the prior and convent had granges at Alvingham, Cockerington, Grainthorpe, Keddington, Newton, Cabourne, Coningsby, and Swinefleet, houses or rents in Lincoln, Louth, Boston, and Great Grimsby, and lands in several other townships in the county. Like many other religious houses, they profited by the embarrassment of lesser barons and knights, and in 1232 were able to purchase the greater part of the manor of Alvingham from John de Melsa, his father and mother, by paying off their debt of 87½ marks to certain Jews. Their claim to two parts of the church of St. Andrew, Market Stainton, involved them in a struggle with Robert Grosteste, bishop of Lincoln, in the reign of Henry III. He revoked the appropriation made by his predecessor, but in 1245 the priory's appeal to Pope Innocent IV was finally successful. The grant of the church of Grainthorpe by Brian of Yarborough was disputed by his sons, but the suit was decided in favour of Alvingham in 1251. In 1254 the spiritualities of the house were assessed at £56 13s. 4d., the temporalities at £53 17s. 4½d. The number of small grants in Alvingham and Cockerington suggests that the prior and convent were popular with their neighbours, or at least very successful in inducing them to part with their land. In 1291 the temporalities had increased to £81 14s. 2½d. The revenues were considerably augmented by the sale of wool, which averaged ten sacks a year at the beginning of the fourteenth century.

Edward I invited the convent to consider providing secure accommodation for Gwenllian of Wales and her cousins, the daughters of Dafydd ap Gruffydd. However, it is not known whether any of these Welsh girls stayed at the convent. The king appears to have sent similar letters to other Lincolnshire convents. Gwenllian was sent to Sempringham Priory, and her cousin Gwladys ferch Dafydd is known to have been sent to Sixhills, whereas the fate of Gwladys' sisters is not known.

14th century

In 1303 the prior held half a knight's fee in Newton, half in Keddington, one-quarter in Alvingham, and one-sixth of another, a quarter in Yarborough and Grimblethorpe, one-sixth in Swinhope, one-eighth and one-fortieth in Cockerington, one-twentieth in Tathwell. In 1428 he also held a quarter in Welton. In 1402 Pope Boniface IX granted an Indulgence to all who would visit the chapel of the Virgin Mary in the Gatehouse of the priory.

15th century

The prior commented on the economic effects of the Black Death in a petition to William Alnwick, Bishop of Lincoln, in 1448. The rectors of the church of Grainthorpe had ceased 'for frivolous reasons' to pay a pension of £10 a year, and the prior was anxious to exercise his privilege to appropriate the church, which was worth 47 marks. He pleaded that owing to floods, sterile lands, pestilence among sheep and cattle, and other sinister events in the past, the convent could not maintain its wonted hospitality. An appeal to Pope Paul II in 1465 resulted in a bull enabling the prior to hold some benefice in commendam on account of the great cost of hospitality.

16th century

In 1535 the clear yearly value of the property amounted to £128 14s. 10d. Of this sum, over £38 was drawn from rectories. The demesne lands farmed by the prior and convent were worth £20 a year. All the granges, lands, and tenements were let. The Earl of Northumberland unjustly held possession of a wood worth £10 a year. At this time the Dissolution of the Monasteries by Henry VIII was about to begin. The house was surrendered on 29 September 1538 by the prior and seven canons. The prioress and eleven nuns were included with them in the pension list. Four years later, in the hands of the crown bailiff, the property brought in £131 16s. 5d., and included the rectories of Alvingham, Cockerington St. Mary, Cockerington St. Leonard, Keddington, Grainthorpe, and Stainton, and granges, lands, and rents in those places, and at Yarborough, Stewton, South Somercotes, Wold Newton, Clee, Great Grimsby, Swinfleet, Flixborough, Normanby, Boston, Rasen, Louth, Lincoln, and elsewhere.

Robert Ingelby was the Prior of Alvingham from 1534 to 1538. Joan Barker was the Prioress of Alvingham in 1538.

There is also a seal of the 13th century, which is a pointed oval. This seal symbolizes the Virgin who is crowned, seated on a carved throne, with ornamental corbel and with the Child sitting on the left knee.

== See also ==
- St Mary's Church, North Cockerington

== Bibliography ==
- Roland W. Morant (2004). The Medieval Abbeys of England And Wales: A Resource Guide. Trafford Publishing. ISBN 978-1-4120-2604-8.
- Brian John Golding (1979). The Gilbertine Priories of Alvingham and Bullington: Their Endowments and Benefactors. University of Oxford.
