= Barnabe Googe =

16th-century English poet and politician

- Born: 11 June 1540; Alvingham, Lincolnshire, England
- Died: c. 7 February 1594; Alvingham, Lincolnshire, England
- Spouse: Mary Darrell
- Issue: Matthew Googe; Thomas Googe; Barnabe Googe; William Googe; Henry Googe; Robert Googe; Francis Googe; Mary Googe
- Father: Robert Googe or Goche
- Mother: Margaret Mantell

Barnabe Googe (11 June 1540 – 7 February 1594), also spelt Barnabe Goche and Barnaby Goodge, was a poet and translator, one of the earliest English pastoral poets.

== Early life ==
Barnabe Googe, born 11 June 1540 (St Barnabas Day), in Alvingham, Lincolnshire, was the son of Robert Googe (d. 5 May 1557) of Chilwell, Nottinghamshire, Recorder of Lincoln during the reign of Queen Mary, son of John Goche of London and Newland, Gloucestershire, in the Forest of Dean, by Jane Bridges, daughter and heir of James Bridges of the Forest of Dean. His mother was Margaret Mantell (d. 1540), the daughter of Sir Walter Mantell (d. 1529) of Nether Heyford, Northamptonshire, by Margaret Wood (d. 1577), one of the daughters and coheirs of Oliver Wood, esquire. Margaret Wood married twice after the death of Sir Walter Mantell (d. 1529). Her second husband was Sir William Haute (d. 1539) of Bishopsbourne, Kent, whose daughter, Jane Haute (d. in or after 1595), was the wife of the rebel, Thomas Wyatt. Margaret Wood's third husband was Sir James Hales. Googe's mother died when he was six weeks old, and according to Lyne, he 'was probably brought up in Kent by his grandmother, Lady Hales'.

By his father's second marriage to Ellen Gadbury, widow of Thomas Parris of London, gentleman (d. 1548/50), and daughter of Thomas Gadbury of London, goldsmith (d. 1529), he had a half brother, Robert Googe. By licence dated 21 May 1563, Ellen (née Gadbury) married William Burnell (d. 1570), esquire, of Winkburn, Nottinghamshire, Auditor to Henry VIII. It is said that Googe 'came to dislike his stepmother intensely'.

At his father's death on 5 May 1557, Googe inherited the manor of Horkstow and the lands of Alvingham Priory in Lincolnshire, and a house in London formerly owned by his grandfather. He studied at Christ's College, Cambridge and at New College, Oxford, but does not seem to have graduated from either. He became a ward of the Queen, and it appears his wardship remained unsold until January 1561, when his kinsman, William Cecil, became Master of the Court of Wards and Liveries, and Googe was allowed to purchase his own wardship for £80, payable over an eight-year term. On 26 June 1563 he was granted licence to enter on his lands. In his will Googe's father had requested his executors to have Googe educated at the Inns of Court, and by 29 March 1560 he was a member of Staple Inn, at the time associated with Gray's Inn, where his cousin, William Lovelace, held the position of Reader in 1562 and 1567. Another of Googe's associates at the Inns of Court was his cousin, Alexander Neville, of Gray's Inn.

In a letter dated 1 October 1563, Cecil referred to Googe as his 'servant' and 'near kinsman'. According to Barrett, there is no record of the position he occupied in Cecil's household apart from reference to him as a retainer and the fact that he was present on special occasions such as the Queen's visit to Theobalds House in Hertfordshire in 1572, when he was 'placed high on the list of servants' and referred to as the first server for the first meal'. Previous authorities claimed that he became a gentleman pensioner to Queen Elizabeth, but this has been disproved. Nonetheless, Googe did have close associations with the court through his relationship to Cecil. He exploited this important connection in the years that followed, and Cecil extended patronage towards his young protégé. It may have been due to Cecil's encouragement that Googe accompanied the Elizabethan humanist scholar Sir Thomas Challoner on a diplomatic embassy to Spain in 1562.

Googe had begun writing poetry, and found himself in an exciting creative coterie with other young writers, such as Jasper Heywood and George Turberville. During his absence in Spain, Googe's juvenile poems were sent to the printer by a friend, Laurence Blundeston. On his return, Googe learned of Blundeston's actions and reluctantly gave his consent to their publication when he discovered that the printer had already paid for the paper for the print run and the composition was underway. The book appeared in 1563 as Eglogs, Epytaphes, and Sonettes, with a dedication to William Lovelace. Before the appearance of his book, no writer in England had ever published his own poetry under his own name; in this, Googe was an accidental pioneer.

== Marriage and later life ==
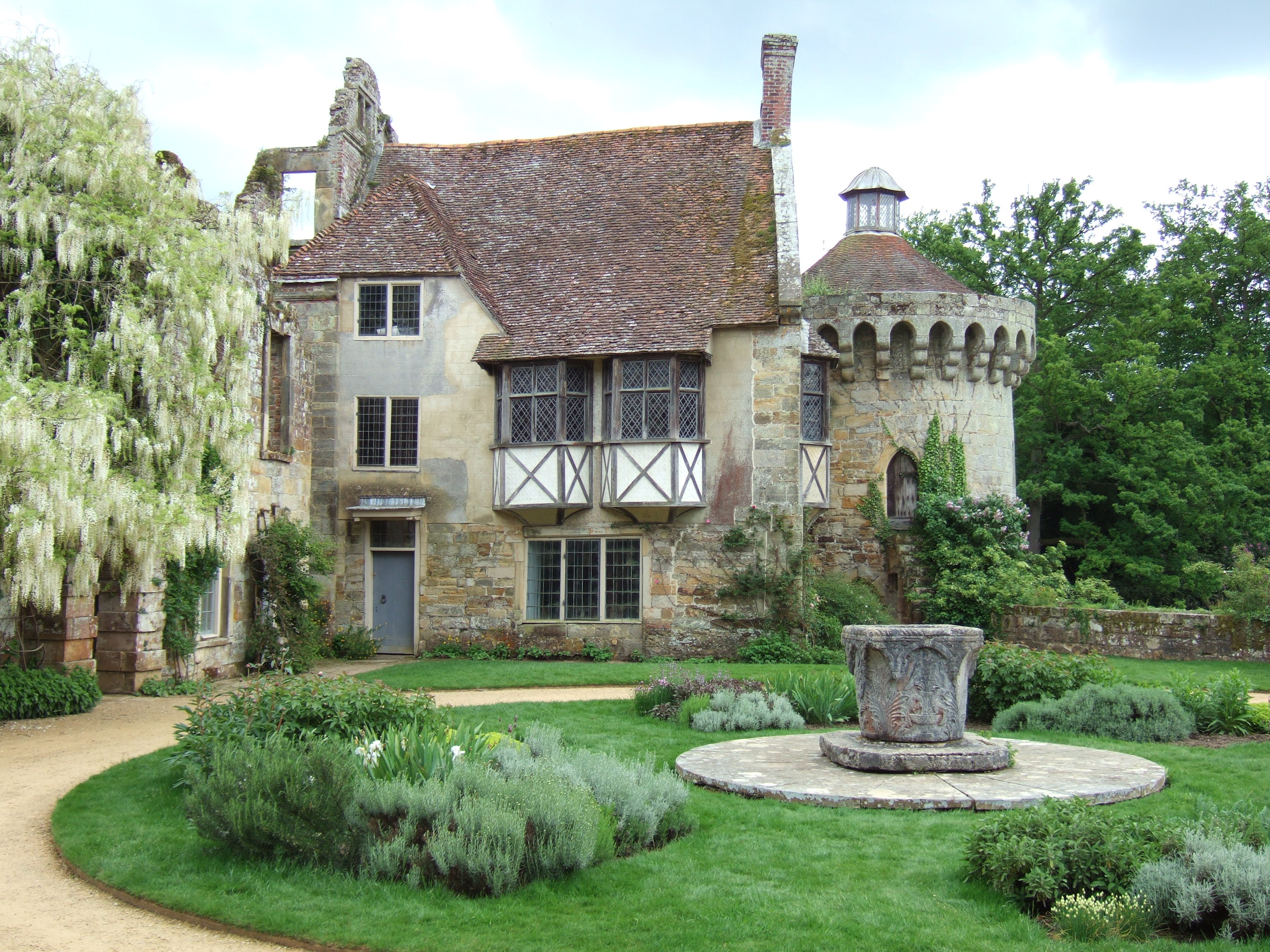
Tudor revival house at Scotney Castle which replaced the home of Googe's wife, Mary Darrell

Googe married Mary Darrell, one of the nine children of Thomas Darrell, esquire, of Scotney Castle, Kent, by his second wife, Mary Roydon, daughter of Thomas Roydon, esquire, of Roydon Hall (or Fortune) in East Peckham, Kent. Correspondence survives on the subject of Googe's marriage with Mary Darrell, whose father, Thomas Darrell, refused Googe's suit on the ground that she was bound by a previous contract to Sampson Lennard (1545 – 20 September 1615), son of John Lennard of Chevening, Kent. More to the point, recent research has shown that Thomas Darrell was a recusant who harboured Jesuit priests in his manor house of Scotney, near Lamberhurst in Kent. When Googe found his suit discouraged by Thomas Darrell, he appealed to his powerful contacts, and after intervention by his 'near kinsman', Sir William Cecil, the marriage duly took place in 1564 or 1565; Googe took his wife to live in Lamberhurst at the manor house of Chingley. They had seven sons, Matthew (c.1566-c.1624), Thomas (b.c.1568), Barnabe, William, Henry, Robert and Francis, and a daughter, Mary.

In 1569 Googe dedicated a long allegorical poem with a moralistic marine topic, The Shippe of Safegarde, to his sisters-in-law. By this time, Googe had served Cecil on a military expedition to Ireland, where he had contracted dysentery and nearly died. In 1571 he was returned as MP for Aldborough, Yorkshire. Further service in Ireland awaited him in 1582 when Googe was appointed to the position of provost-marshal of the court of Connaught; some twenty letters of his in this capacity are preserved in the Public Record Office. Googe considered the post a hardship. He wrote to Burghley that "I here live amongst a sort of Scythians, wanting the comfort of my country, my poor wife and children". Googe repeatedly petitioned the political masters in London to be allowed to come home. On the death of his stepmother, Ellen (née Gadbury) in 1587 he received his inheritance. He finally succeeded in selling his office in the late 1580s.

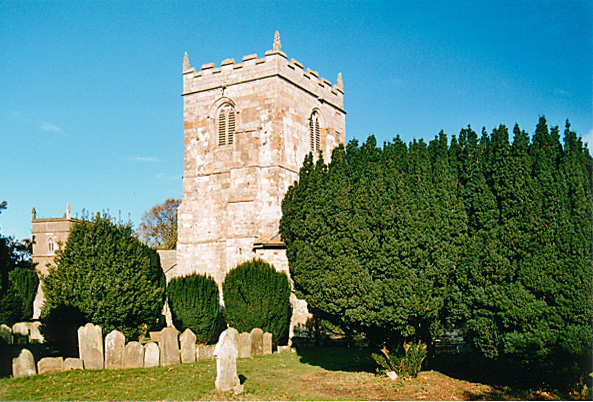
Burial place of Barnabe Googe, St Adelwold Church, Alvingham, and St Mary's Church, North Cockerington, with their shared churchyard

Googe's last known letter, dated 19 June 1587, was written from Lord Burghley's chamber at court. In it Googe mentioned his new home at Alvingham. He is thought to have retired there for the remainder of his life. He died at Alvingham about 7 February 1594, and was buried in Cockerington church.

== Works ==
Googe began work on his translation on Palingenius’s Zodiacus vitae in the spring of 1559. He gave up soon after, but, encouraged by his uncle Thomas Mantell, his cousin Thomas Honywood, and the author and churchman John Bale, he resumed work on 12 December (which was the day of the winter solstice in 1559). He had finished the first three books by 10 March 1560, when he wrote the Latin dedication to three Kentish squires who had given him support : William Cromer, Thomas Honywood, and Ralph Heyman. On 28 March, de wrote a dedication in English to his grandmother, lady Hales, viz. Margaret Wood (Mantell Haute Hales). This instalment contains a Latin verse by Gilbert Duke, and various liminal poems by Googe himself.

By January 1561, Googe had completed the first six books of the Zodiac, which were published that years with a new dedication to Googe’s kinsman, sir William Cecil, dated 11 January. The earlier ones were not printed. Duke wrote a second Latin verse, and there were other Latin verses by Edward Dering and William Chaderton. Googe tells us that he had been accused of plagiarising the first three books; and the edition of 1565 he reveals that one of the clerks of the Privy Council, William Smith, had translated these books before Googe started work on them. Dering’s poem is an attack on William Fulke’s Antiprognosticon (1560), and on his supporters, who include William Painter, John Lucas the Younger, and Fulke’s brother Samuel.

On 18 April 1565, the full twelve-book version of Googe’s translation was published. There is a new dedication to Cecil. The poems from the 1561 edition are reprinted, with the exception of Dering’s. New poems by Christopher Carlile, Googe’s step-uncle, Jacobus Itzuertus (presumably a relative of the queen's French secretary, Nicasius Yetsweirt), David Bell, and Richard Stephens.

The Zodiac was printed again in 1576, and several times afterwards.

Googe's poems are written in the plain or native style which preceded and subsequently competed with the Petrarchan style. Petrarchan love poetry (much of the work of Henry Howard, Earl of Surrey, Sir Philip Sidney, Thomas Campion and others) was decorative, metaphorical and often exaggerated; it also involved a more fluid mastery of iambic English poetry than the alliterative Native Style: Googe's tonic accents are heavy, the unaccents light; the result is sometimes deliberately blunt and plodding. The poems of George Turberville, Thomas More, George Gascoigne and Walter Raleigh are examples of a similar style.

Plain Style dealt with serious subjects in a serious way: its goal was not ornamental beauty, but truth. Googe's poem of Money ("Give money me, take friendship whoso list / For friends are gone come once adversity...") is a well-known example of the tradition.

Googe was an ardent Protestant, and his poetry is coloured by his religious and political views. In the third "Eglog", for instance, he laments the decay of the old nobility and the rise of a new aristocracy of wealth, and he gives an indignant account of the sufferings of his co-religionists under Mary I of England. The other eclogues deal with the sorrows of earthly love, leading up to a dialogue between Corydon and Cornix, in which the heavenly love is extolled. The volume includes epitaphs on Nicholas Grimald, John Bale and on Thomas Phaer, whose translation of Virgil Googe esteemed.

The English pastoral poem "Phyllida was a fayer maid" (from Tottel's Miscellany of 1558) has been doubtfully ascribed to Googe, despite showing little stylistic rapport with his acknowledged works. But Googe's important contribution to pastoral poetry in English rests with his cycle of eclogues that synthesise trends from classical pastoral, the work of Mantuan, and the pastoral elements of Spanish romance, and he was the first English writer to reflect the influence of the Diana Enamorada of Montemayor.

== Translations ==
Translations make up much of his other works which include:

- a translation from Marcellus Palingenius (said to be an anagram for Pier Angelo Manzolli) of a satirical Latin poem, Zodiacus Vitae (Venice, 1531?), in twelve books, under the title of The Zodyake of Life (1560);
- The Popish Kingdome, or reign of Antichrist (1570), translated from Thomas Kirchmeyer or Naogeorgus; The Spiritual Husbandrie from the same author, printed with the last Foure Bookes of Husbandrie (1577), collected by Conradus Heresbachius;
- The Overthrow of the Gout (1577), a translation from Christopher Ballista (Christophe Arbaleste), and The Proverbes of Lopes de Mendoza (1579).

The Zodyake of Life was a significant translation, being adopted as a textbook for English grammar schools. As such, its ideas colour many of the works of English writers of the latter part of the sixteenth and the first part of the seventeenth centuries. Part of the book's appeal, in addition to its poetical astronomy, was its notoriety as a Reformist text: Palingenius was placed on the Index Librorum Prohibitorum by the Inquisition, and consequently enjoyed popularity in Protestant regions across Europe. Between 1577 and 1631 the agricultural translation was printed at least six times under the title, The whole art of husbandry.

== See also ==
- Canons of Renaissance poetry
