= Henry Denham =

Henry Denham was one of the outstanding English printers of the sixteenth century.

He was apprenticed to Richard Tottel and took up the freedom of the Stationers' Company on 30 August 1560. In 1564 he set up his own printing house in White Cross Street, Cripplegate, but in the following year he moved to Paternoster Row, at the sign of the Star, where he remained for many years. His printing office was well supplied with good type in all sizes, from nonpareil to great primer, and he had a fine range of initial letters, ornaments and borders. He was particularly fond of arranging his titles with a lace border formed of printers' flowers and showed much ingenuity in their arrangement.

When Henry Bynneman died in 1583, he appointed Denham and Ralph Newbery to be his executors. Shortly after this it is thought that Denham started the Eliot's Court Printing House.

Denham was an industrious printer and in 1583 was returned as having four presses; in 1586-7 and 1588-9 he served as Junior Warden of the Stationers' Company, but he never became Master. About 1585 he removed to Aldersgate Street. The last entry under his name occurs in the Registers on 3 December 1589, after which nothing more is heard of him.

Richard Yardley and Peter Short succeeded to the business.

Denham invented the rhetorical question mark "⸮" in the 1580s, which did not become a permanent part of the language.
