= Hamelinus Decanus (Dean of Lincoln) =

- Dean of Lincoln
- See: Diocese of Lincoln
- Appointed: 1164
- Term ended: 1164
- Other post: Canon of Alvingham Priory

Personal details
- Denomination: Catholic

Hamelinus Decanus (Hamelin the Dean) was a Priest in the Roman Catholic Church and founder of the Alvingham Priory.

== Career ==
Hamelinus established a charter which allowed 'The order of St. Gilbert of Sempringham' the creation of Alvingham Priory during the time of Pope Eugene III, between 1145 and 1153. The Charter also shows that the Church of Alvingham was given to Robert de Chesney, then Bishop of Lincoln, who invested the monks at Alvingham Priory. Hamelinus had made during this time substantial land donations to Alvingham Priory. Hamelinus goes on to provide a gift to the Gilbertine nuns three-quarters of 'his' Parish Church of Alvingham to add to that given to them by their founder Roger, son of Jocelin. Therefore, he must have been the Vicar of the Parish Church of Alvingham, as well as its patron and a substantial land holder.

The ecclesiae Anglicanae records that about 1164 Hamelinus was a Dean of Lincoln. He is referred to by some however as Dean of Yarburgh (Yarburgh becoming Yarborough). As the Church in Alvingham was in Louthesk he is more likely to have been Dean there however (Louthesk becoming Ludborough), although as always with these things this is not clear.

Regardless, about he is also shown as a Prebendary of Aylesbury which at this time appeared to be a role performed by a Dean of Lincoln.

Hamelinus is known to have resigned from his deanery position however and joined Alvingham Priory as a canon. There he made further gifts of land from the Parish of Grainthorpe.

== Family ==
Hamelinus appears to have been married for he had at least five sons, one of whom was called Brian.

He was probably the nephew of Hugh of Avalon who was Bishop of Lincoln.
