= Ralph Newbery =

English printer (1535–1608)

Ralph Newbery (1535 Waltham St. Lawrence – 1608 Littlewick Green) was an English printer active in London. He became a Freeman of the City of London on 21 January 1560. The first book he published was The zodiake of life, a translation by Barnabe Googe of Zodiacus Vitae (Venice, 1531?) by Marcellus Pallingenius Stellatus.
