= Alvingham =

Village and civil parish in the East Lindsey district of Lincolnshire, England

Coordinates: 53.400392°N 0.049266°E

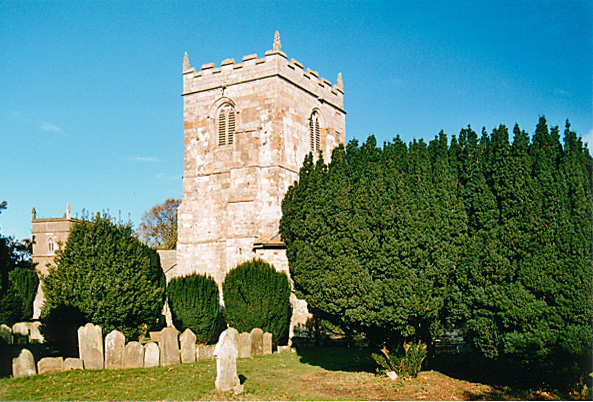
- St Adelwold church with neighbouring (redundant) St Mary's Church (North Cockerington) in the background, next to the Louth Canal

- Location within Lincolnshire
- Population: 256 (2011 census)
  - London: 130 mi (210 km) S
- District: East Lindsey
- Shire county: Lincolnshire
- Region: East Midlands
- Country: England
- Sovereign state: United Kingdom
- Post town: LOUTH
- Postcode district: LN11
- Police: Lincolnshire
- Fire: Lincolnshire
- Ambulance: East Midlands
- UK Parliament: Louth and Horncastle

Alvingham is a village and civil parish in the East Lindsey district of Lincolnshire, England. It is situated 3 miles (5 km) north-east from the market town of Louth.

== History ==
The village is mentioned in the Domesday Book of 1086 as "Aluingeham", meaning "Homestead of the Ælfingas (the tribe of Ælf)". It was the location of a Gilbertine Alvingham Priory until the dissolution of the monasteries. In the pre-Norman period, as the Lincolnshire coastline grew further into what had previously been tidal salt marsh, people from Alvingham settled the nearby village of Conisholme.

The 16th-century poet and translator Barnabe Googe inherited lands of the former Alvingham Priory after his father's death.

Alvingham Mill is mentioned in the Domesday Book.

== Geography ==
In the west of the parish, the village borders Keddington. The parish boundary meets Brackenborough with Little Grimsby, east of Brackenborough Wood. Passing northwards, it meets Yarburgh, and crosses the Alvingham–Yarburgh road near Newholme. It follows Black Dike in a north-east direction, north of America Farm. Where it crosses the north–south Louth Canal, it briefly meets Grainthorpe.

On Alvingham Fen it meets Conisholme and the Seven Towns North Eau, one of the constituents of the River Lud as it approaches the coast. Directly to the east is a large wind farm on Conisholme Fen. The boundary follows the Seven Towns North Eau southwards, to the west of Nunnitts Farm (outside the parish). It meets North Cockerington at the point the Seven Towns North Eau, Seven Towns South Eau, and Old Eau meet to form the River Lud. The river (and parish boundary) runs parallel, to the south, to the Louth Canal.

== Community ==
The village is noted for containing two churches in the same churchyard. One, the now redundant St Mary's was previously the church of the neighbouring parish of North Cockerington, and is now under the care of the Churches Conservation Trust. The other, Alvingham's parish church of St Adelwold's, was restored in 1933 after being unused for most of the 19th century. St. Adelwold's was built on the foundations of an earlier Saxon church and is the only British church dedicated to the Saxon Saint Adelwold.

St Adelwold (Alvingham with Yarburgh and North Cockerington) is in the Mid Marsh group of churches with Great Carlton, South Cockerington, and Grimoldby, and based in Grimoldby. The religious parish is larger than the civil parish, as it includes North Cockerington, a civil parish.

The village has a Women's Institute and a farm shop.

Alvingham Village Hall holds events for the village and the wider local area, including an 'Open Mic' night for musical talent.

== Gallery ==
Gallery

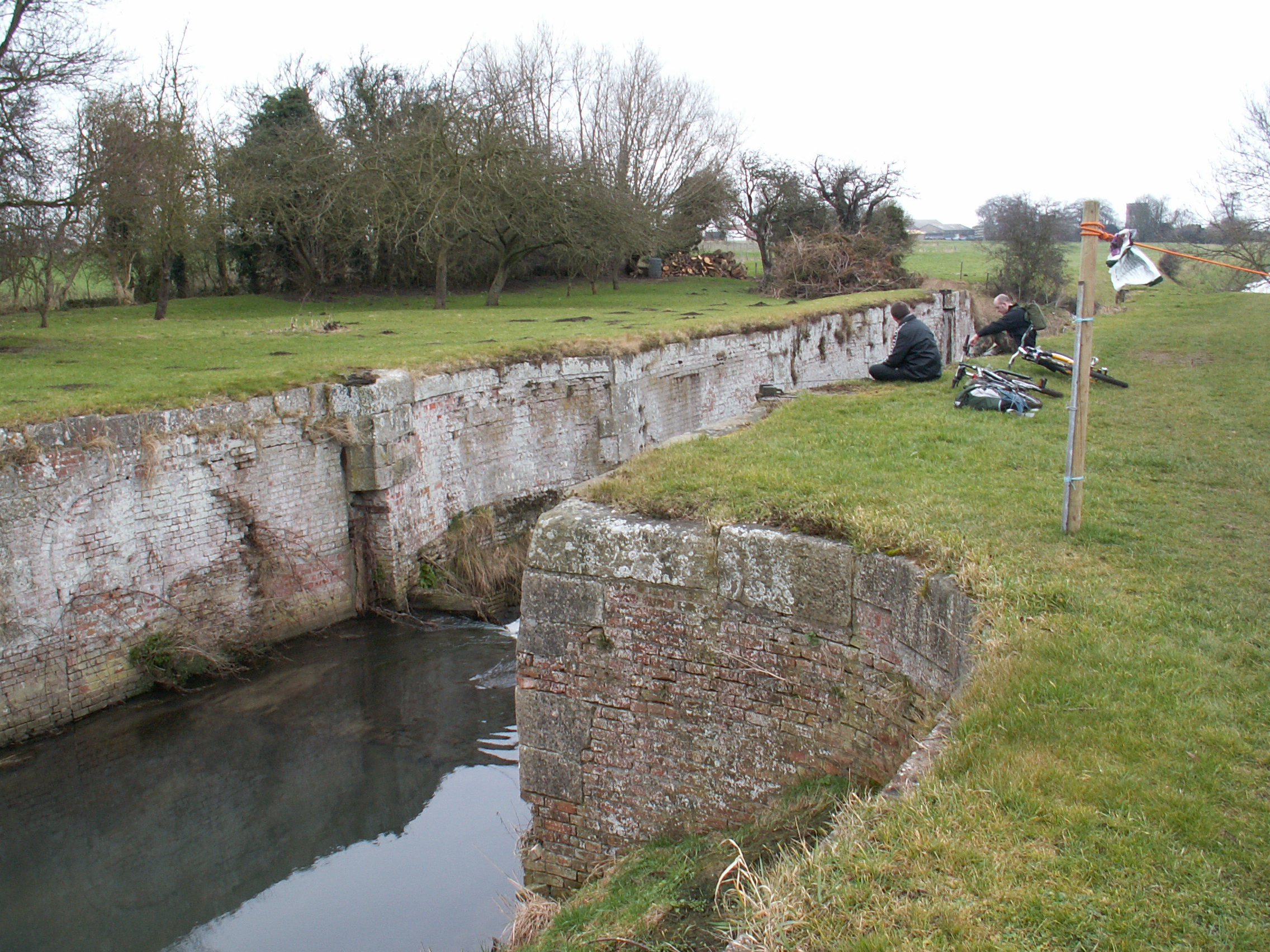
Remains of a lock

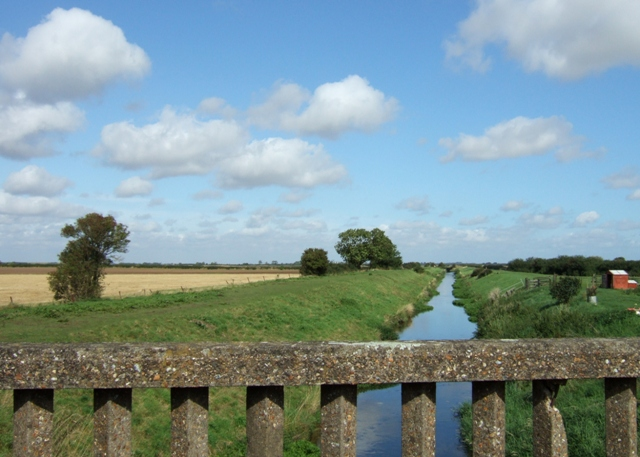
Louth Canal

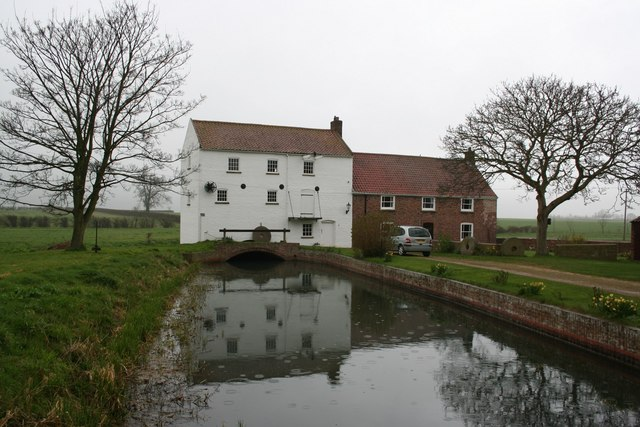
Alvingham Mill

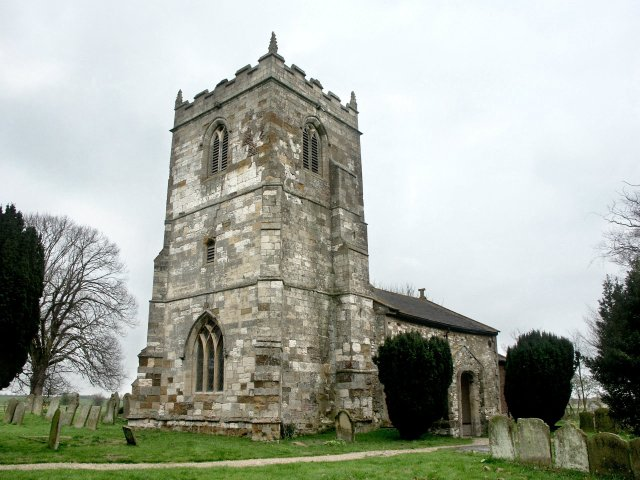
St Adelwold
