= Louth Navigation =

Canalised river in England

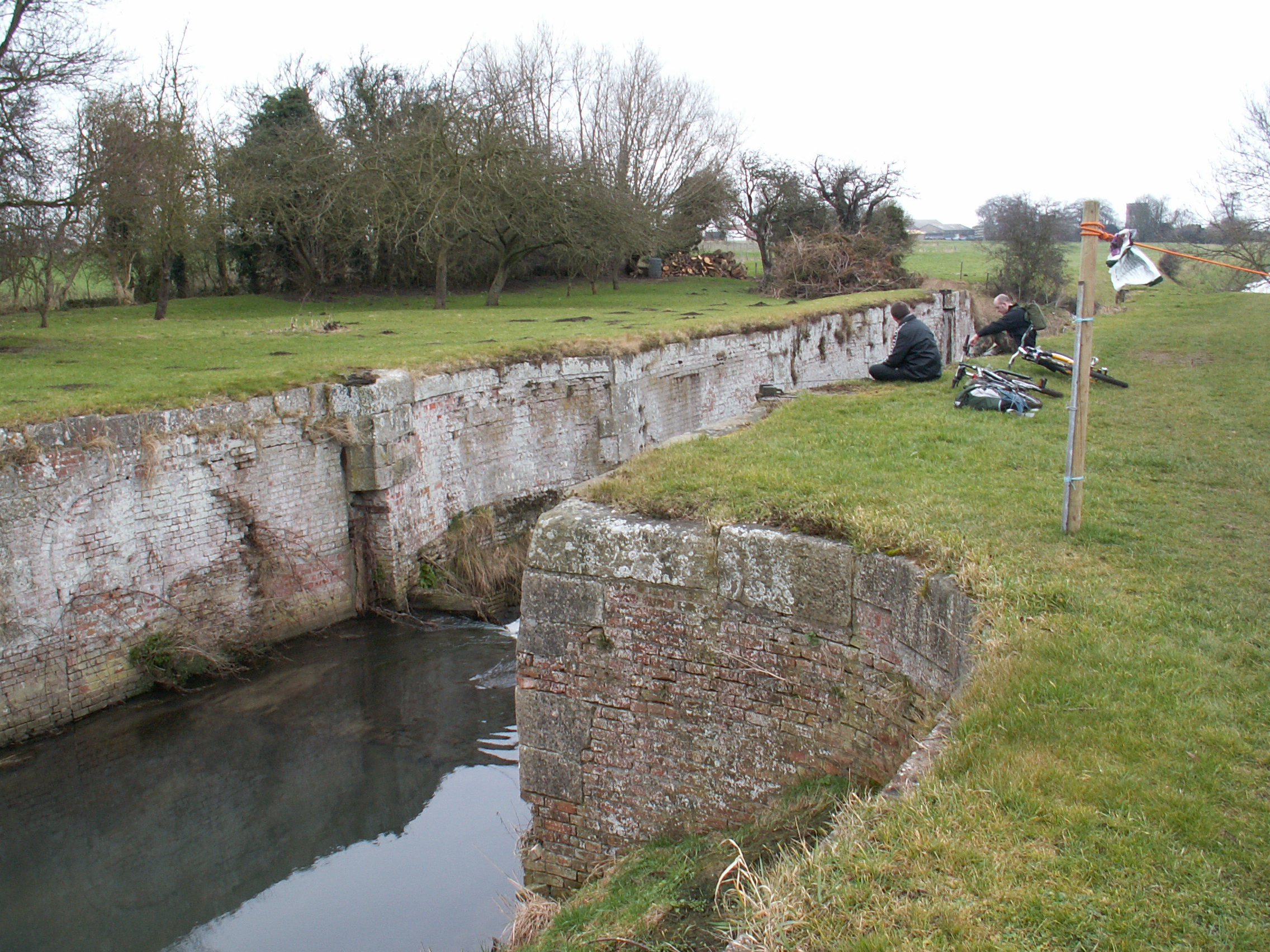
- Remains of a lock at Alvingham
- Interactive map of Louth Navigation

Specifications
- Locks: 8
- Status: derelict

History
- Principal engineer: John Grundy Jr
- Other engineer: James Hogard
- Date of act: 1763
- Date of first use: 1767
- Date completed: 1770
- Date closed: 1924

Geography
- Start point: Louth
- End point: Tetney Haven

The Louth Navigation was a canalisation of the River Lud. It ran for 11 miles (18 km) from Louth in Lincolnshire, England, to Tetney Haven, at the mouth of the Humber. It was authorised by an act of Parliament in 1763 and completed in 1770, under the supervision of the engineer John Grundy Jr. and then by James Hoggard. Eight locks were required to overcome the difference in altitude, six of which were constructed with sides consisting of four bays.

The act did not provide the normal provisions for raising capital for the construction, as finance could only be obtained by leasing of the tolls. When completed, the commissioners leased the tolls to Charles Chaplin, who held ten shares and was also a commissioner, for an initial period of seven years. When the lease was due for renewal, no other takers were found, and Chaplin was granted a 99-year lease, despite the fact that the act did not authorise such an action. He collected the tolls but failed to maintain the navigation. When complaints were received, a new act of Parliament was obtained in 1828 to alter the tolls and legalise Chaplin's long lease. The lease was transferred to two railway companies in 1847, and reverted to the commissioners in 1876. The operation was a moderate success until the beginning of the 20th century, when there was a rapid decline in income, and the canal formally closed in 1924.

Because the canal was also a land drainage channel, it was not subject to infilling, and is now a designated main river, managed by the Environment Agency that drains the surrounding land managed by the Lindsey Marsh Internal Drainage Board. It is as a feeder for Covenham Reservoir, from which treated water enters the public water supply. Water from Waithe Dike supplements the supply, effectively flowing upstream along the canal, and when required, additional water is pumped into the canal along a pipeline from the Great Eau.

== History ==
Despite being separated from the sea by a low coastal plain, which made contact with the wider world difficult, by the 18th century Louth had become a prosperous market town with a forward-looking town corporation. Realising that a link to the North Sea would provide opportunities for trade and expansion, in October 1756 they commissioned the engineer John Grundy Jr. to survey a route. He suggested a route from Louth to Tetney Haven, and on 28 January 1760, subscriptions were invited to pay for a full survey and an act of Parliament. The fund soon reached £850, and on 18 February 1760 the town clerk approached John Smeaton to carry out the survey. Smeaton advised caution, suggesting that they obtained the consent of as many landowners as possible before proceeding with a bill, as opposition in Parliament could be difficult to counter.

In August, Smeaton reviewed Grundy's plans, which was for a river navigation. Cuts would be made to straighten the River Lud, and a sea sluice and lock would be provided where the river joined the Humber. The length would be a little over 11 miles (18 km), and nine locks would be required along its course together with several bridges. Costs for different sizes of canal were provided, from £15,590 for a two barge canal to £10,884 for a canal suitable for lighters drawing 2 feet (0.61 m). The committee asked Grundy to accompany them to Lincoln Races, where they would show the plans to the noblemen and gentlemen. This produced a favourable response, and with little local opposition, the pace of the project slowed. The reports were printed in September 1761, and the bill was submitted to Parliament on 6 December 1762.

Louth Navigation Act 1763
- Act of Parliament
- Parliament of Great Britain
- Long title: An Act for making a Navigation from the River Humber, by a Canal, or Cut, at or near Tetney Haven, to the River Ludd, in the Parish of Alvingham, in the County of Lincoln; and for continuing the said Navigation, in or near the said River, from thence to or near the Town of Louth, in the said County.
- Citation: 3 Geo. 3. c. 39
- Territorial extent: Great Britain

Dates
- Royal assent: 24 March 1763
- Commencement: 25 November 1762 (Note: Start of session.)
- Repealed: 24 June 1828
Other legislation
Repealed by	Louth Navigation Act 1828

Status: Repealed

Text of statute as originally enacted

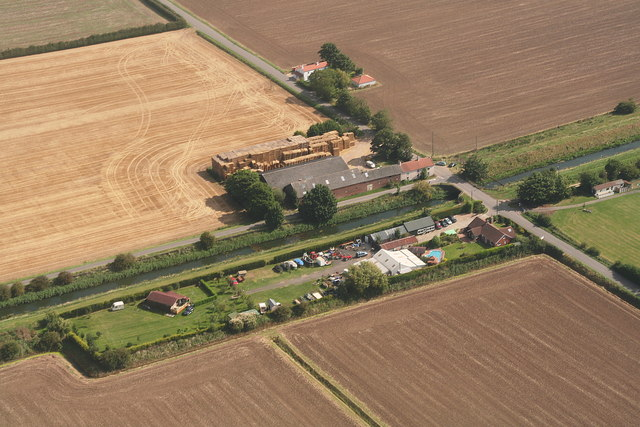
Firebeacon Bridge, the terminus of the initial section opened in 1767

The canal obtained the Louth Navigation Act 1763 (3 Geo. 3. c. 39) on 24 March 1763, but contained no proper provision for raising the capital needed to build the canal. Money could only be borrowed against the expected tolls, and this caused difficulties. On 30 May, the commissioners tried to find someone willing to lend £14,000, in return for all the tolls. A year later, they tried to raise £12,000 in transferable shares of £100 each, but the uptake was slow. By 13 February 1765, the full amount had been subscribed, and Grundy was engaged as Chief Engineer at a salary of £300 per year. He employed James Hogard as resident engineer, and work began in March. By mid-1767, the outfall sluice and lock at Tetney Haven had been completed, as had the first 7 miles (11 km) of cut. The cut was of sufficient depth that water levels were around 2 feet (0.6 m) below the land surface, so that the navigation could act as a land drain as well as a canal. The first 5 miles (8 km) from Tetney Haven to Fire Beacon Lane were opened in May 1767. Hogard then took over from Grundy as Chief Engineer, at a salary of £140 per year, and began the construction of the final section including seven locks. Additional subscriptions had to be found to fund the work, but the navigation reached Riverhead basin at Louth, and a formal opening was held in May 1770. The total cost was £27,500.

At Louth, the River Lud was diverted from its original course to the north of the Riverhead basin, and followed a new course along its south side. It supplied Bain's Water Mill, from which water discharged into the basin to maintain its level. When the mill was not in use, water levels were topped up through a 4-foot (1.2 m) diameter culvert, which passed under a stables and granary to reach the basin. Initially, the commercial community around Riverhead was separate from the main centre of population in Louth, but after the coming of the railway, ribbon development resulted in the two areas being connected. Six of the eight locks were built in an unusual way with the sides of the lock chambers consisting of four elliptical bays, to help them resist soil movement in the surrounding ground. It is not known which of the engineers involved in the construction designed the locks, which are rare in Britain. The two other locks had conventional straight walls. The locks were not built to a standard size, varying in length between 86 and 100 feet (26 and 30 m) and in width between 15.25 and 19 feet (4.65 and 5.79 m), although all had a depth of 5.33 feet (1.62 m) over the sill, to cater for the keels and sloops that used the navigation.

=== Operation ===
The act of Parliament allowed the commissioners to lease the tolls for periods of up to seven years, and the first lease was granted to Charles Chaplin, one of the commissioners who held ten shares, in January 1770. He agreed to pay a rent of 4 per cent per year to the other shareholders, and to contribute a maximum of £500 per year towards maintenance costs. If more than £500 was needed, the commissioners were to supply any additional amounts. Although Chaplin had an option to renew the lease after 7 years, he did not do so, and no other takers could be found. The commissioners then negotiated with Chaplin, and revised terms were agreed. In return for a 99-year lease, he would fund all repairs, pay the salaries of the officers of the canal, and pay 5 per cent interest to the subscribers. Clearly, the 99-year lease was not authorised by the enabling act, but nobody challenged its legality for over 50 years. Chaplin was not thorough in carrying out his side of the bargain and had to be reminded that he had not been paying the interest in 1782 and again in 1788.

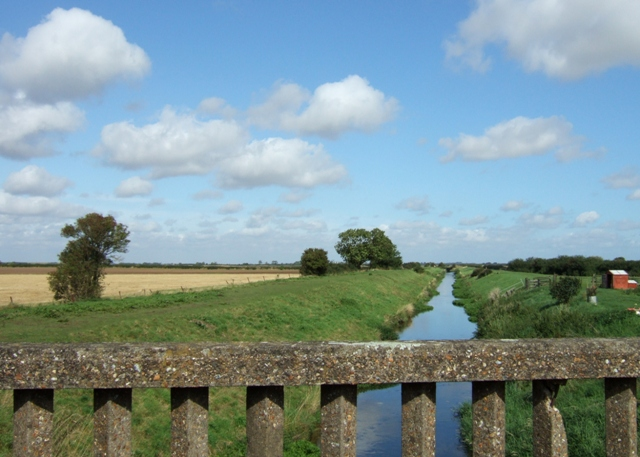
The channel near Alvingham is quite straight

There were problems with water levels in 1792. A lack of maintenance had resulted in silting, and horses were used to tow the barges, rather than them sailing along the navigation. To prevent the boats grounding, the water levels had been raised, preventing natural drainage from the surrounding land and causing flooding. Chaplin was ordered to carry out repairs but failed to do so, and died soon afterwards. His son Thomas took over, and tried to negotiate an end to the lease. On paper, this appears to have been accepted, but it is not clear that it was carried out, since George Chaplin, the son of Thomas, paid for the navigation to be made wider and deeper in 1811, and spent another £400 on repairs in 1814. There are no records of actual tolls, but estimates suggest that they rose from around £2,000 in the 1770s to £5,000 in the 1820s. Interest payments were £1,375 per year, and Chaplin argued that it had only become a profitable enterprise for him in the 1820s.

Louth Navigation Act 1828
- Act of Parliament
- Parliament of the United Kingdom
- Long title: An Act for improving and maintaining the Navigation from the River Humber to Altringham in the County of Lincoln, and from thence to Louth in the same County.
- Citation: 9 Geo. 4. c. xxx
- Territorial extent: United Kingdom

Dates
- Royal assent: 9 May 1828
- Commencement: Repeals: 24 June 1828 (Note: Section 1.); Rest of act: 9 May 1828 (Note: Section 2.)
Other legislation
Repeals/revokes	Louth Navigation Act 1763

Status: Amended

Text of statute as originally enacted

East Lincolnshire Railway (Louth Navigation Purchase) Act 1847
- Act of Parliament
- Parliament of the United Kingdom
- Long title: An Act to authorize the East Lincolnshire Railway Company to purchase an existing Lease of the Louth Navigation.
- Citation: 10 & 11 Vict. c. cxiii

Dates
- Royal assent: 2 July 1847

Text of statute as originally enacted

Users of the canal felt that the tolls, which had not altered since 1770, were too high, as the volume of traffic using the navigation had increased. To rectify the situation, a new act of Parliament, the Louth Navigation Act 1828 (9 Geo. 4. c. xxx) was obtained in 1828, which reduced the tolls and formalised the 99-year lease of 1777. In 1847, the East Lincolnshire Railway Company obtained the East Lincolnshire Railway (Louth Navigation Purchase) Act 1847 (10 & 11 Vict. c. cxiii) which allowed them to purchase the lease of the Louth Navigation, and later the same year, the Great Northern Railway Company (GNR) obtained the Great Northern Railway Company's Purchase Act 1847 (10 & 11 Vict. c. cxlviii) allowing them to purchase or lease the East Lincolnshire Railway (and the canal). They held it for the remaining 29 years, as a tactical move to prevent opposition from the existing leaseholders. When the lease came to an end, the General Manager of the GNR reported that they had kept the tolls as high as was legally possible, but suggested that they refrain from renewing the lease. The commissioners were unable to find anyone wanting to bid for the tolls, and collected them themselves until a bidder was found three months later. Although the tolls were lower than they had been under railway ownership, income was satisfactory into the early 1900s.

=== Decline ===
The early years of the 20th century saw a rapid decline in the use of the canal and the First World War killed what traffic was left. Income for 1916 was only £66. The final blow was the devastation caused by the Louth flood of 1920 to the Riverhead area, the terminus of the canal. The commissioners applied to the Minister of Transport, asking to be relieved of their liability to maintain the canal. In 1924, the county council and the rural district council agreed to take over maintenance of the bridges. The final annual general meeting took place on 5 September 1924, and the assets of the navigation were sold on 8 October. The sale raised £6,240, of which £1,500 had to be paid to the councils towards the bridge works. The remainder was distributed to the shareholders in 1927.

== Present function ==
With the demise of navigation and the decay of the lock structures, water levels are considerably lower than they once were. The whole of the canal, together with parts of the old channel of the River Lud, the Black Dike, the Poulton Drain and the Waithe Dike, which feed into the Mother Drain before it joins the canal, are designated as main rivers, and are the responsibility of the Environment Agency. The land drainage functions for the low-lying land surrounding the lower reaches of the canal are the responsibility of the Lindsey Marsh Internal Drainage Board (IDB). This was formed in November 2000, when the Louth IDB, the Alford IDB, and the Skegness District IDB amalgamated. The Lindsey Marsh IDB maintains five pumping stations which pump into the canal, and because of the lower water levels, a number of drains which discharge into the canal by gravity.

Most of the flow from the River Lud is fed into the canal, and the Environment Agency maintain a tilting weir at the site of the original Top Lock. This controls water levels in the Riverhead Basin, and also includes a gauging station which measures the flow along the canal. The water is used for three main purposes. Some water is fed back into the River Lud to maintain its ecology. Some is licensed to be abstracted for spray irrigation of crops. Large volumes are also pumped from a feeder into Covenham Reservoir, from which it is treated and fed into the public water supply. Water from the Waithe Dike supplements this, and effectively flows upstream along the canal. In summer months, the available supply is not always sufficient to meet the demand, and additional water is pumped along a 36-inch (914 mm) pipeline from the Great Eau. The pumping station is located at Cloves Bridge, to the east of Saltfleetby All Saints, and the 6.8-mile (11 km) pipeline empties into the canal below the site of Outfen Lock.

To protect the drinking water supply from contamination by salt water entering the canal through the outfall sluice, the original Tetney Lock has been replaced by a tilting weir. This is controlled automatically, and maintains a difference in level between its upstream and downstream sides. The difference is between 6 and 8 inches (15 and 20 cm) in winter, rising to between 16 and 18 inches (40 and 45 cm) in summer.

== Louth Navigation Trust ==
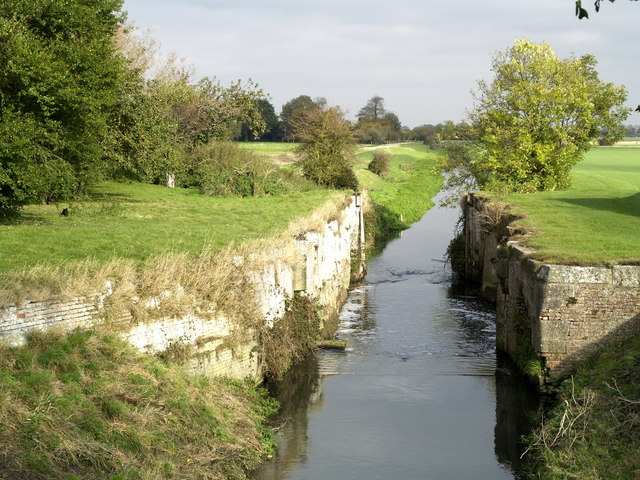
Alvingham lock, the best preserved of the surviving locks

The Louth Navigation Trust was formed in 1986 as a registered charity, with the primary aim of preservation, conservation and restoration of the canal and of the buildings associated with it, including the lock structures. The trust has carried out several projects, using voluntary labour, including maintenance of Ticklepenny Lock and clearance work on the towpath. The trust is based at the Navigation Warehouse at Riverhead, Louth, which it helped to restore to a high standard in 1998/9, in partnership with Groundwork Lincolnshire.

The towpath may be walked along the whole length of the canal, parts of which are in shallow water. The trust is engaged in a scheme to restore the full length of the canal. A feasibility study commissioned in September 2004, WAS carried out by Faber Maunsell. The costs were shared by the trust, Louth Town Council, Lincolnshire County Council, the Inland Waterways Association, East Lindsey District Council, and Anglian Water.

The Louth Navigation, unlike many other disused canals, is in water throughout its length and has not been in-filled or built over as it is important for drainage of the surrounding land. Several formerly movable bridges have been replaced with fixed bridges. The eight locks are in varying states of repair; two have been obliterated, while Alvingham lock is the best surviving example.

== Route ==
The navigation begins at a large basin near the centre of Louth, which runs in a north-easterly direction. At the end are two Grade II listed warehouses. To the west is Navigation Warehouse, a rectangular building with five bays and three storeys, constructed of red brick with a pantile roof. It is little altered from when it was built in 1790. It was used to store grain and wool, which was then shipped down the navigation. It was largely open-plan, but has since been converted into offices, although most of the original features are still visible. To the east is Jackson's Warehouse, with ten bays, two storeys and an attic. It was converted into a dwelling in 2003, which resulted in minor changes to the doors and windows, but the open-plan interior has been retained. The two buildings are complemented by the Woolpack Inn, also Grade II listed.

Baines Flour Mill, which supplied water to the basin, is a red-brick building, dating from around 1800, with hipped pantile roofs. The main section has three storeys, and there is a two storey office range. Adjacent to the mill was the works of the Louth Gaslight Company, which were built in 1826. Baines erected a stone to define the boundary between his land and that of the gaslight company in 1878, following a dispute over encroachment. Soon the site of the top lock is reached. This has been replaced by a tilting weir, which controls water levels in the basin.

Keddington, where much of the parish church dates from the twelfth and fourteenth centuries, was the site of Keddington Church Lock, although little of it remains. Ticklepenny Lock is better preserved, with four concave sections separated by timber posts. The third section is partially hidden by a twentieth century concrete bridge, which carries a minor road over the lock chamber. Nearby are the Grade I listed ruins of Louth Abbey, a Cistercian abbey dating from 1139. Willows Lock is also reasonably well preserved, and is of a similar construction to Ticklepenny Lock, as is Salter Fen Lock, although it differs in having a large opening which acts as an overflow in the south-eastern side.

Sandwiched between the canal and the River Lud is a sewage treatment plant. The treated effluent is discharged into the canal below the lock site. Beyond the works are Alvingham Fisheries, and then a bridge which carries Lock Road over the canal. Alvingham Lock has two semi-circular drain openings in its western wall, and an inverted syphon carries water from the River Lud under the lock, to feed the mill pond for Alvingham Mill. The canal then passes the church of St Mary, once the chapel for a Gilbertine Priory, which dates from the eleventh to fourteenth centuries. It was the parish church for North Cockerington, and is Grade I listed. In the same churchyard is the parish church of St Adelwold, also Grade I listed, and built in the 13th, 15th and 16th centuries. The churches separate Alvingham Water Mill from the canal. The present building was constructed in 1782 by John Maddison, with extensions in 1900, and it was restored in 1972. Most of the machinery, including an 11-foot (3.4 m) diameter breast shot water wheel, dates from 1782, and was in regular use following restoration. The building replaced an earlier structure, as a water mill is known to have existed on the site since 1155. Water from the mill stream flows into Westfield Drain and returns to the canal a little further downstream. This is only possible because of the lowered water levels in the canal. Before closure to navigation, there was another inverted syphon under the canal, which returned the water to the River Lud, but this has been blocked up and abandoned.

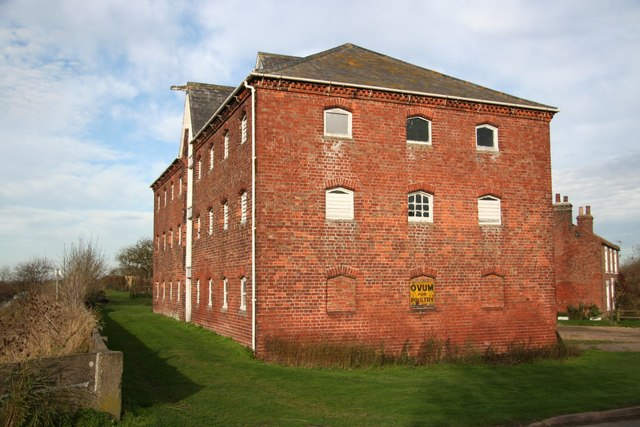
The Navigation warehouse at Austen Fen, built in the 19th century

At High Bridge, the canal turns to the north, and the River Lud continues to the north-east as the Old Eau. Outfen Lock was one of the locks constructed with straight sides. The western wall has collapsed, but the eastern wall survives. The surrounding countryside is very flat and low lying, being crossed by numerous drainage ditches. The Black Dike enters the channel from the west. Water from Austen Fen is pumped into the canal by Austen Fen East and West pumping stations. These, and the other pumping stations that discharge into the canal are owned and operated by the Lindsey Marsh Internal Drainage Board. The canal continues past Canal Farm and under Fen Bridge. On the east bank is a nineteenth century nine-bayed warehouse with three storeys and an attic. Biergate East and West pumping stations are situated near Covenham Reservoir, constructed in the 1960s to supply drinking water. The works to treat the water is near Fire Beacon Farm and bridge, the temporary terminus of the opened waterway during construction.

Fulstow East and West pumping stations are close to Heelgate Farm. The only major road to cross the canal is the A1031, which does so at Thoresby Bridge. By the bridge is another surviving warehouse, built in 1821 with seven bays and three storeys, and Thoresby Bridge pumping station. The final straight sided lock was at Tetney, but nothing remains of it. It has been replaced by a sluice with rising sector gates. The final section is now protected from high sea levels by an outfall sluice at Tetney Haven, with two sets of pointed doors.

At Tetney Lock the canal leads out to the North Sea to the east, and to Louth to the east. It is a popular fishing and kayaking location.

Selection of photographs from the collection on Wikimedia Commons
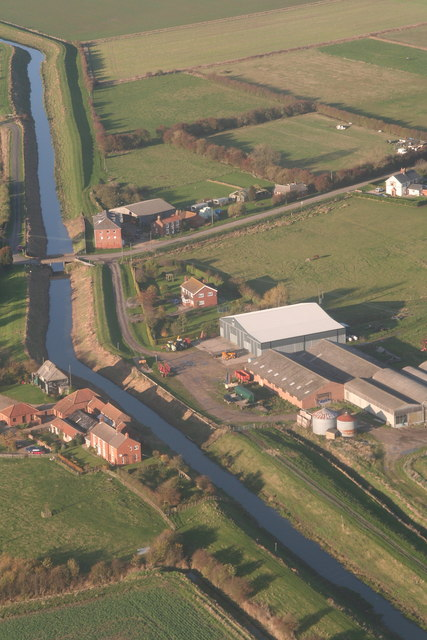
Austen Fen

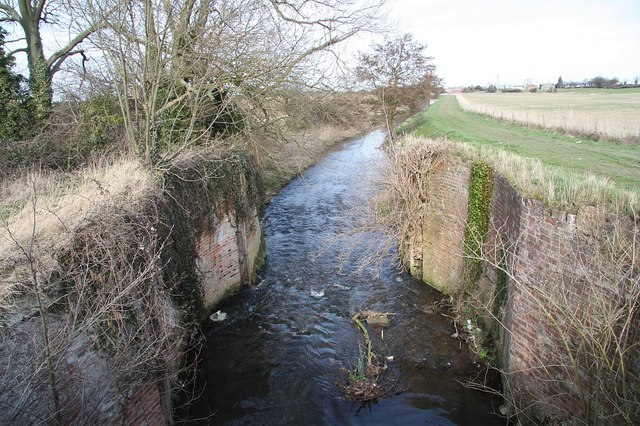
Ticklepenny Lock

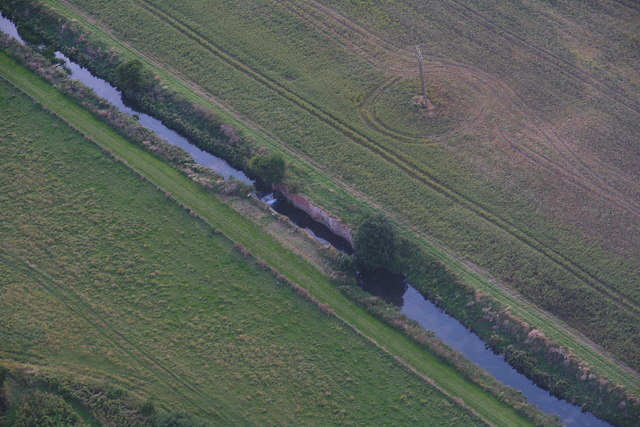
Willows Lock

== Points of interest ==
Point	Coordinates (Links to map resources)	OS Grid Ref	Notes
Tetney Outfall Sluice	53.5079°N 0.0406°E	TA354031	
Tetney Lock	53.4988°N 0.0218°E	TA342021	
Thoresby Bridge	53.4773°N 0.0114°E	TF335997	
Fire Beacon Bridge	53.4527°N 0.0362°E	TF353970	
Out Fen Lock	53.4139°N 0.0665°E	TF374927	
Alvingham Lock	53.3973°N 0.0518°E	TF365909	
Salter Fen Lock	53.3921°N 0.0413°E	TF358903	
Willows Lock	53.3843°N 0.0325°E	TF352894	
Ticklepenny Lock	53.3799°N 0.0285°E	TF350889	
Keddington Church Lock	53.3759°N 0.0212°E	TF345884	
Top Lock	53.3733°N 0.0126°E	TF339881	Tilting weir
Louth River Head	53.3716°N 0.0089°E	TF337879	end of canal

== See also ==
- Canals of Great Britain
- History of the British canal system

== Bibliography ==
- Boyes, John; Russell, Ronald (1977). The Canals of Eastern England. David and Charles. ISBN 978-0-7153-7415-3.
- Faber Maunsell (2005). "Restoration of the Louth Navigation" (PDF). Louth Navigation Trust. Archived (PDF) from the original on 4 March 2016.
- Sizer, Stuart M; Clark, Josephine (2006). People & Boats – A History of the Louth Canal. Louth Navigation Trust. ISBN 978-0-9536451-1-4.
- Skempton, Sir Alec; et al. (2002). A Biographical Dictionary of Civil Engineers in Great Britain and Ireland: Vol 1: 1500 to 1830. Thomas Telford. ISBN 978-0-7277-2939-2.
