= Covenham Reservoir =

Reservoir in Lincolnshire, England

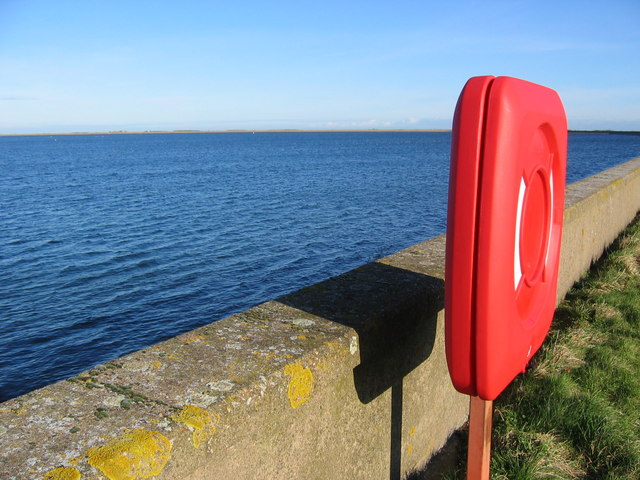
- View from the reservoir walls

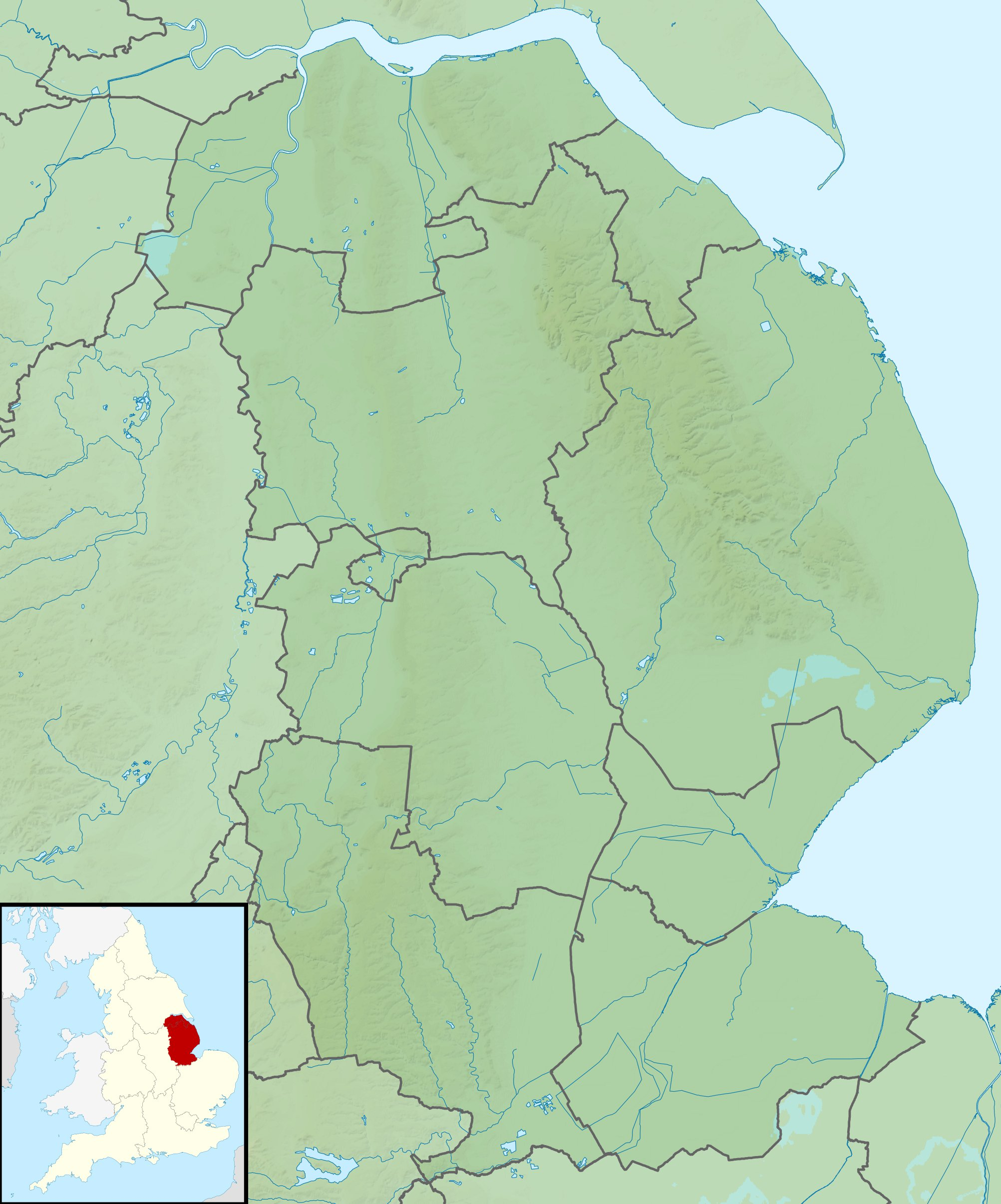
- Location within Lincolnshire
- Location: Lincolnshire
- Coordinates: 53.443°N 0.025°E
- Lake type: Reservoir
- Basin countries: United Kingdom
- Average depth: 20 m (66 ft)
- Water volume: 11 million cubic metres (390×10^{6} cu ft)

Covenham Reservoir, located in East Lindsey is a 200-acre reservoir and treatment works constructed between 1963 and 1978 by W. & C. French. The reservoir was built next to the Louth Navigation canal and acts as a pumped storage reservoir from the canal, and can be supplemented by transfer schemes from Great Eau and Long Eau rivers.

Opened in 1972 by Princess Alexandra, the reservoir was subject to some controversy as it was to be built on high grade agricultural land. The reservoir is approximately 1 km by 1 km in size and the depth is approximately 20m. Remedial works concerning a slip (movement) in the north embankment were undertaken at some point.

The reservoir is situated between Grimsby and Louth in Lincolnshire. The reservoir hosts a watersports centre offering sailing, waterskiing and diving with a perimeter walkway open to the public. Built on the Lincolnshire coastal marsh, the sides of the reservoir offer views over surrounding farmland towards Grimsby, to the north, the coast, Louth and the Lincolnshire Wolds to the west.

The reservoir acts as storage for times of low aquifer recharge in the area, and can be used to prevent saline intrusion into the Lincolnshire chalk aquifer which is the primary source of water in East Lincolnshire. The return of treated effluent from Louth to the Louth Canal, and Great Eau transfer scheme also help to maintain the water levels of the reservoir in this relatively dry region of the UK.

The reservoir is constructed of walls all around, raised 20m above the low lying Lincolnshire marsh. The structure is concrete lined, which prevents growth of marginal plants, however this does not prevent the reservoir attracting varied waterfowl and other birds.

The reservoir primarily serves the water needs of the Grimsby and Cleethorpes conurbation, as well as being a supply feed for Louth, Mablethorpe and Skegness. In 2012 a £40 million pipeline linking the reservoir to the town of Boston in the south of the county began, and is expected to be capable of transferring 26 million litres of water a day.
