= Priory Hotel, Louth =

Historical building in Louth, England

Coordinates: 53°22′05″N 0°00′12″E

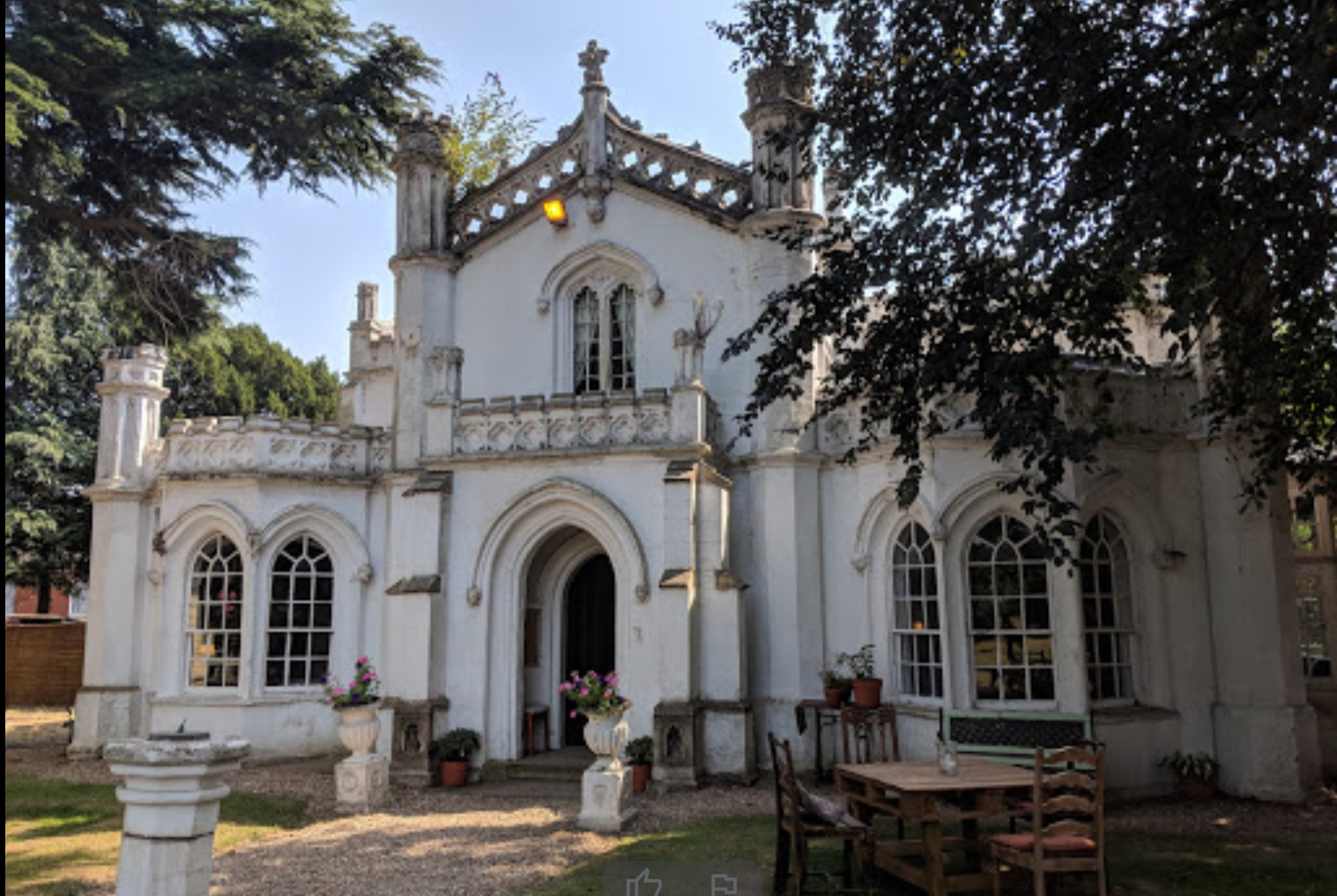
The Priory Hotel

The Priory Hotel in Louth, Lincolnshire is a building of historical significance and is listed on the English Heritage Register. It is described as an accomplished example of an early 19th Century villa of fine quality. It was built from 1812 to 1818 by Thomas Espin, a talented topographical artist and draughtsman. It was the home of several prominent people over the next two centuries. Until June 2025 it was a hotel which provided accommodation, restaurant facilities and catered for special events. Following its closure the buildings and grounds were put on the market for £1.25m, the sales particulars providing both historical and contemporary information about the Priory, the Dower House and the 3.5 acre grounds including Espin's Mausoleum.

== Early residents ==
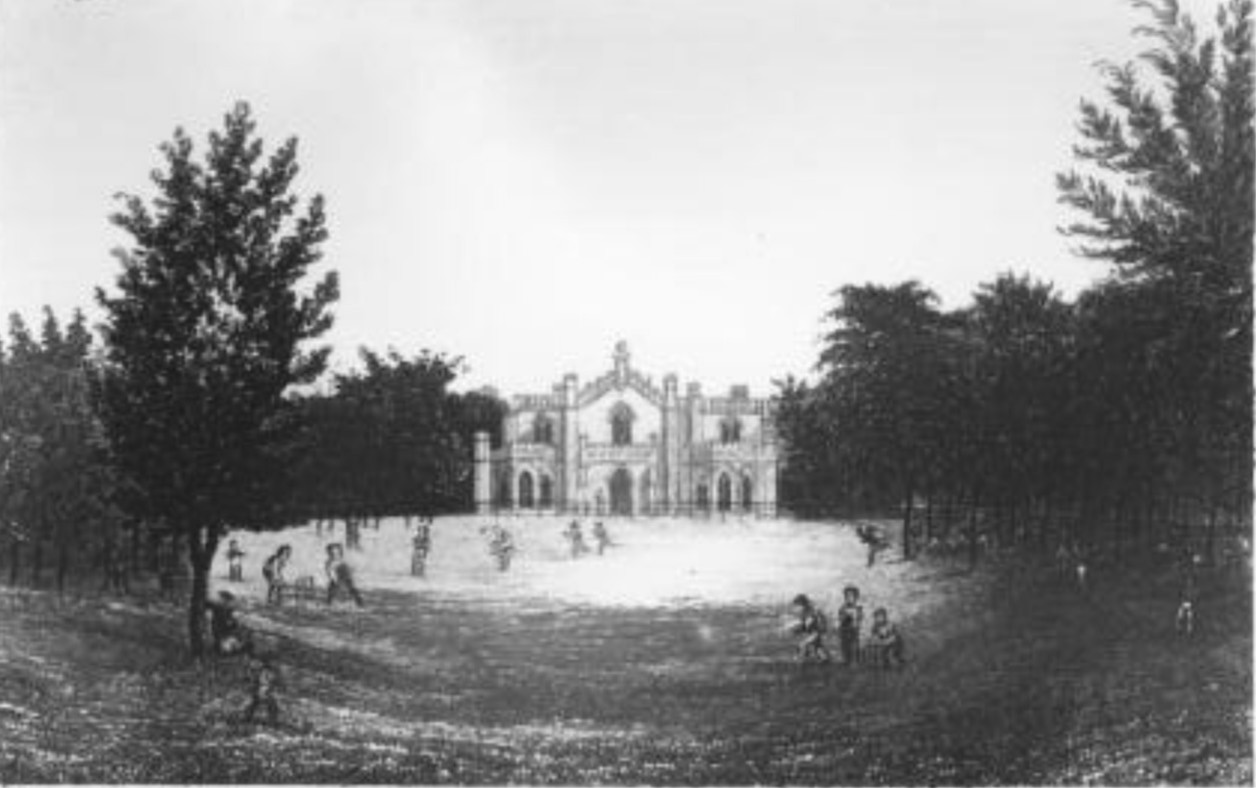
The Priory in about 1830

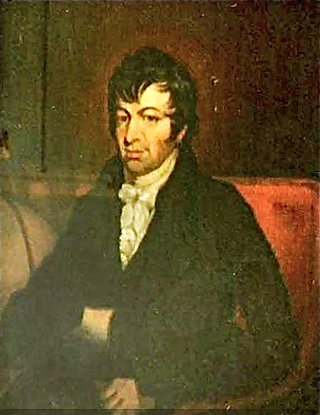
Thomas Espin

Thomas Espin (1767–1822) built the Priory between 1812 and 1818. He was educated at Wragby Free School and later became a Fellow of the Society of Antiquarians. In 1790 he was appointed Master of Louth's Mathematical, Architectural, Nautical and Commercial Academy, colloquially known as the Mapletoft School. When Thomas finished building the Priory in 1818, the school was moved there.

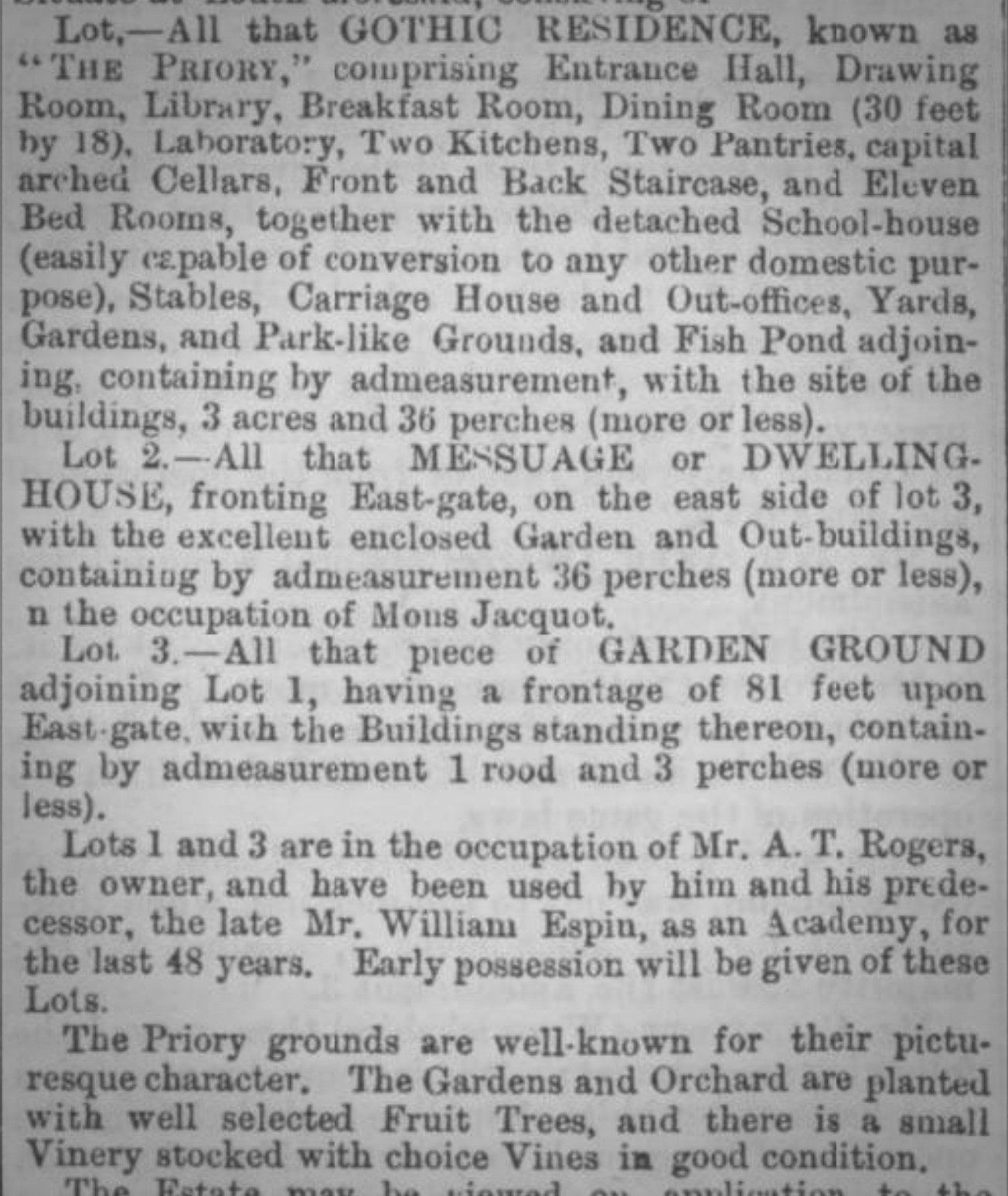
Sale notice for the Priory in 1870

His architectural talents were utilised by the Louth Corporation on several occasions. In 1805 he supervised the rebuilding of the belfry windows of St James's Church. He also drew up unused designs for a new Town Hall. In payment he was given the salvaged masonry and material from the former Town Hall and from the ruins of the 12th Century Louth Park Abbey. He incorporated these into the building of the Priory. It is thought that his work on St James Church inspired some of the architecture of the Priory as the façade of structure with its two-storey central bay with pierced parapet, flanked by single-storey crenulated bays, strongly resembles the east front of the church.

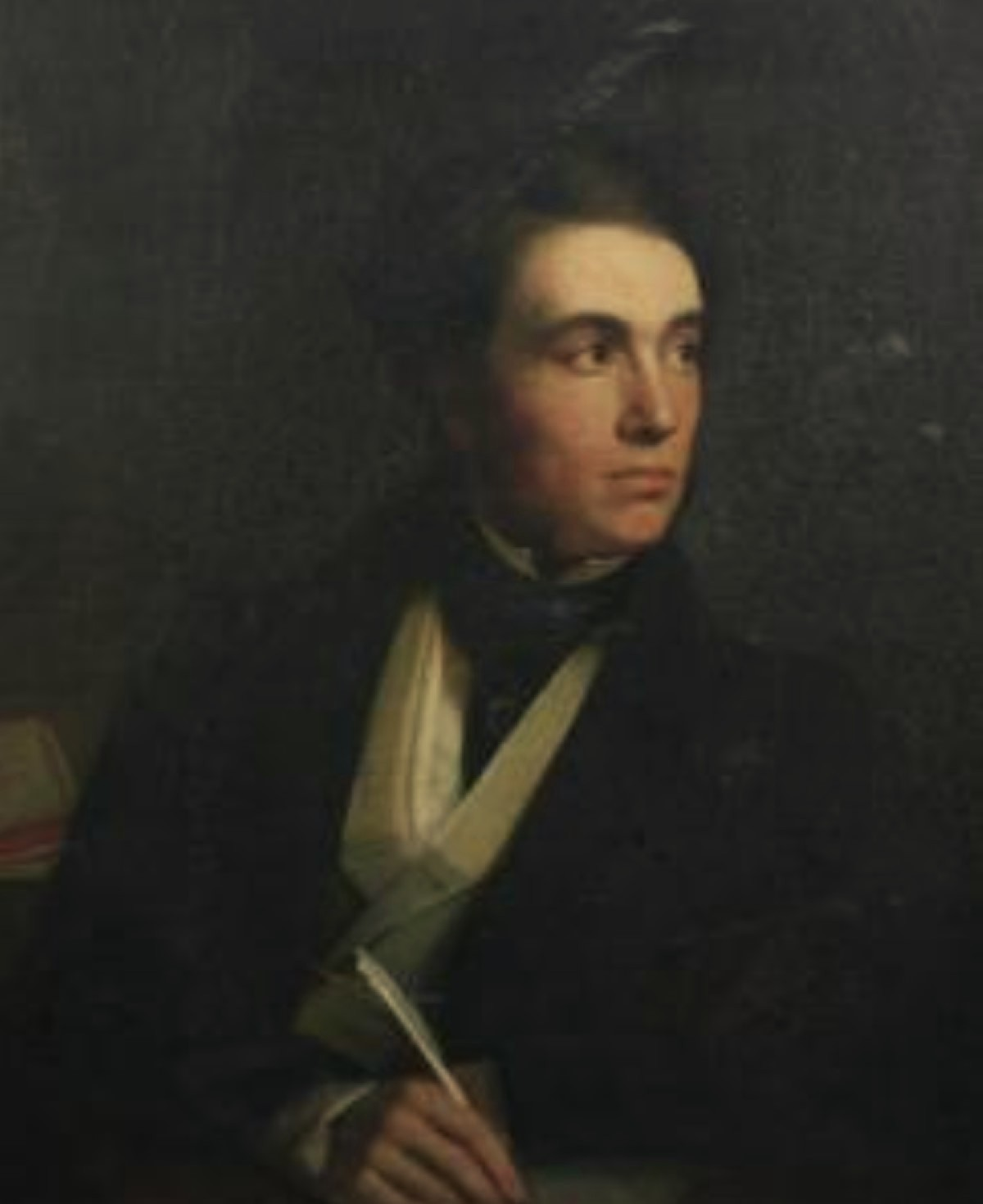
Alexander Tallents Rogers

According to Historic England, the Priory is "the very personal creation of [Espin], whose presence is especially felt in details such as the portrait headstops in the library and the built-in clock he set on his way upstairs at the time he wished for breakfast."

After his death in 1822, his step-brother William Espin moved into the Priory and took over the running of the school. By 1831 Alexander Tallents Rogers was the headmaster. He remained there for the next forty years.

Alexander Tallents Rogers (1804–1881) was born in 1804 in Nottingham. His father was Clement Rogers who was also a schoolmaster. He married Sarah Armston in 1828 at St Mary's Church, Nottingham. The 1841 Census records Alexander and his wife living at the Priory with their five children and thirty pupils. He also had two teaching assistants and several servants.

In 1870 he advertised the house for sale. The advertisement is shown. He and his wife moved to Penge and lived there for the rest of their lives.

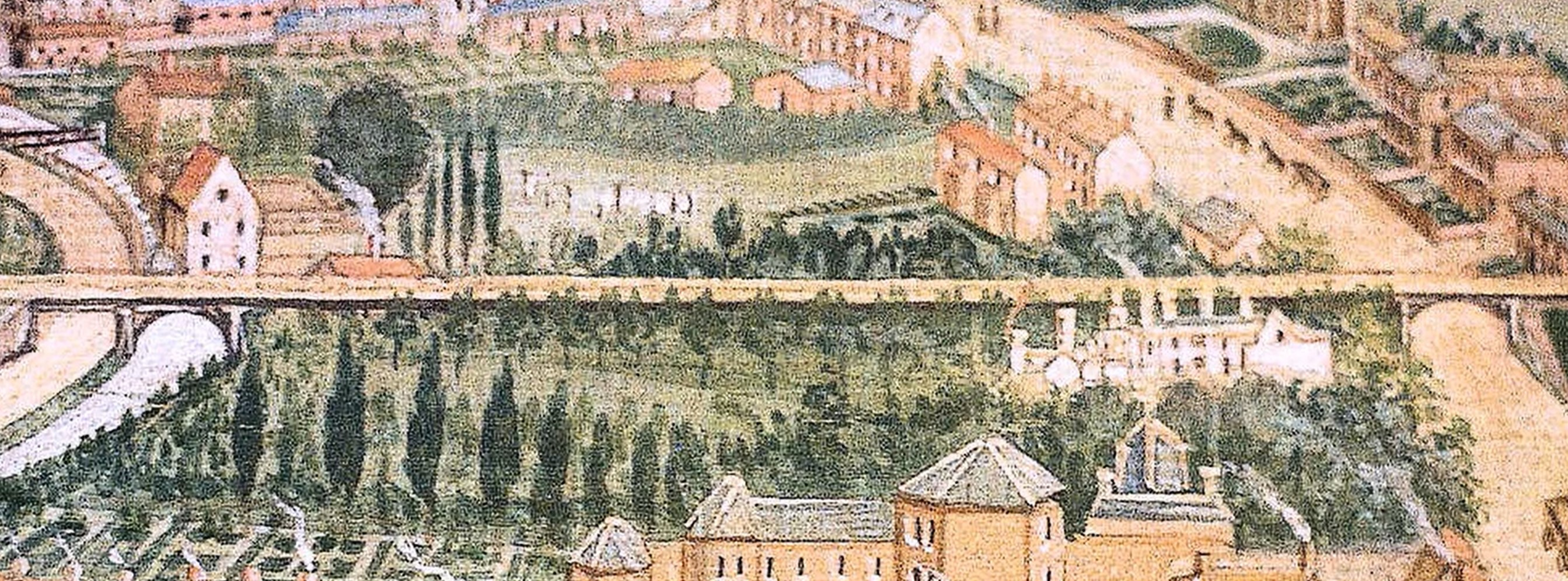
The Priory and its gardens (central white building) in Brown's Panorama of Louth in 1844

== Later residents ==
By 1878 Samuel Topliss (1825–1909) owned the Priory and lived there for the next thirty. He was a silk merchant and draper in Mercer Row, Louth. He became very wealthy and bought several properties. He was born in 1825 in Binbrook. He married twice. His first wife died in 1852 and four years later in 1856 he married Sarah Jane Chapman (1832–1894) who was the daughter of Joseph Chapman, a farmer in Grainthorpe. He was on the Louth Town Council and became a Manager of the Louth Savings Bank. He died in 1909 and the house was sold to William Lacey.

William Lacey (1861–1948) was a wealthy stationer and draper. He was also the Mayor of Louth. He was born in Tuxford, Nottinghamshire in 1861. His wife's name was Susan. They had no children but their niece Ivy Jones Lacey (1897–1984) lived with them for most of their lives. Ivy was a trained nurse. Susan died in 1943 and William in 1948. They were buried in London Road Cemetery in Louth and part of their memorial stone is an unusual wooden Celtic Cross which can be seen at this reference. Ivy inherited The Priory and lived there until 1955 when she sold it and moved to a smaller house.
