= Pier Angelo Manzolli =

Italian poet

Pier Angelo Manzolli was a name used for the author of the book Zodiacus Vitae, who is believed to be the Neapolitan poet Marcello Stellato, in Latin Marcellus Palingenius Stellatus (born ca. 1500 - died in Cesena before 1551).

The persona of Pier Angelo Manzolli was created by Jacopo Facciolati in the eighteenth-century.

== Writing ==
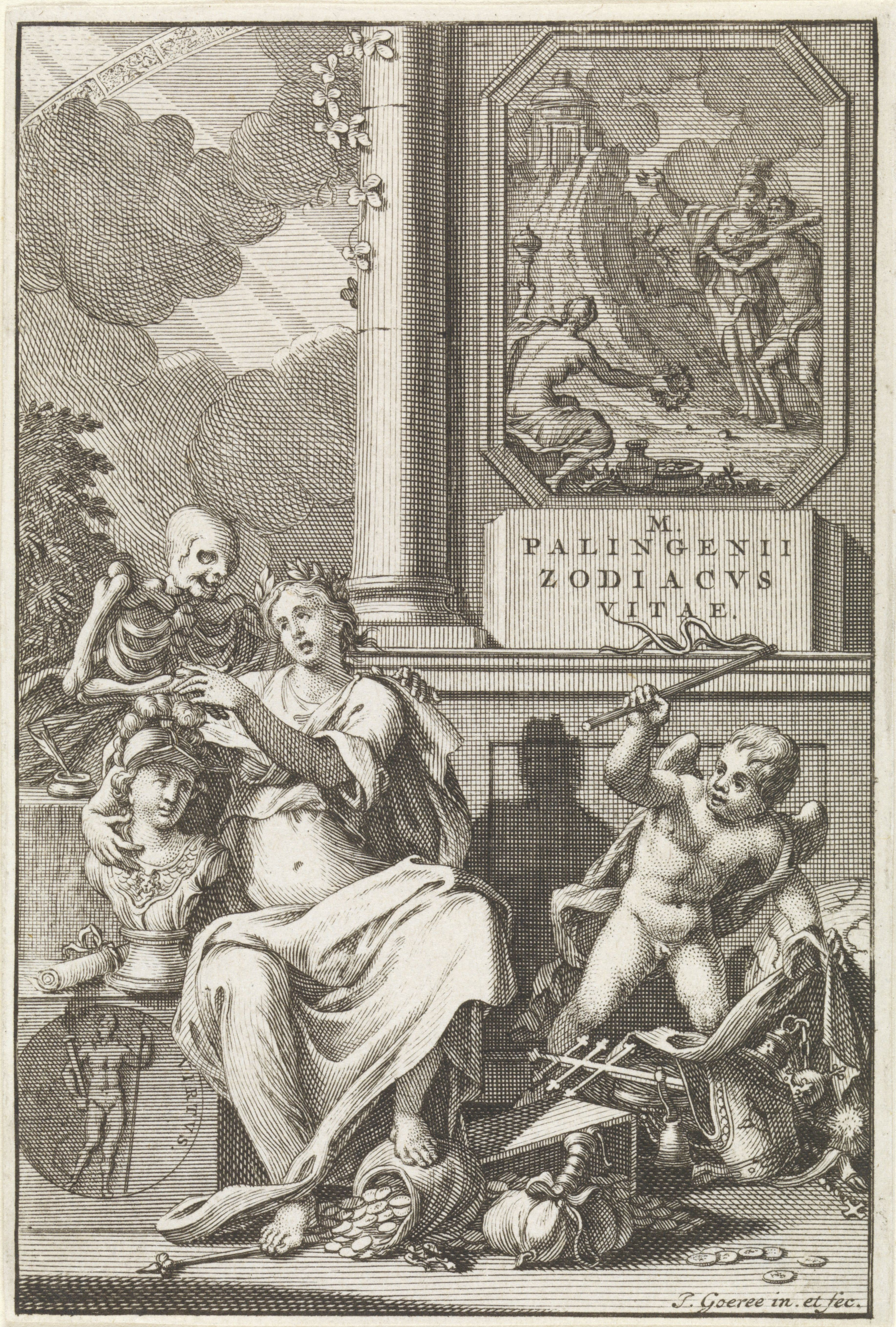
Zodiacus Vitae. Amsterdam Johannes Hofhout, 1722.

Zodiacus vitae is a Latin poem divided into 12 books, one for each sign of the zodiac, published at Basel in 1537 and 1543 (3rd edition), but first published in Venice in 1536, and dedicated to Ercole II d'Este, duke of Ferrara. The didactic poem addresses the subject of human happiness in connection with scientific knowledge, and combines metaphysical speculation with satirical attacks on ecclesiastical hypocrisy, and especially on the Popes and Martin Luther.

It was translated into several languages, but fell under the ban of the Inquisition on the ground of its rationalizing tendencies. In 1551. After Stellato's death, the Catholic Church burned his heretical bones and Pope Paul IV placed his book in the first Index Librorum Prohibitorum, ("Index of Prohibited Books"), in 1559.

=== Influence in England ===
As a Christian humanist poet, he features strongly in the grammar-school education of 16th century England, translations including that of 1565 by Barnabe Googe. His specific influence on William Shakespeare has been noted especially in the Seven ages of man speech from As You Like It.

== See also ==
- Juvencus
- Baptista Mantuanus
- Prudentius
