= Thomas Espin =

English schoolmaster, illustrator and architect

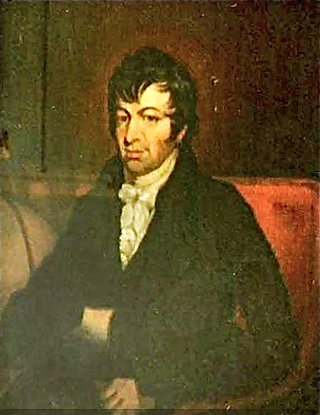
- 1895 portrait by Thomas Wilkinson Wallis
- Born: September 1767; Holton cum Beckering, Lincolnshire
- Died: 14 December 1822 (aged 55); Louth, Lincolnshire
- Education: Wragby Free School
- Known for: Illustrations in Howlett’s Views in the County of Lincoln and as the architect of the Priory, Louth
- Scientific career
- Fields: Schoolmaster, mathematician, topographical artist, antiquarian and amateur architect.

Thomas Espin FSA (bapt. 20 September 1767 – 14 December 1822) was an English schoolmaster, topographical artist, antiquary and amateur architect. He spent most of his life in Louth, Lincolnshire, where he is known as the designer and original owner of the Priory Hotel.

== Early life and education ==
He was born at Holton cum Beckering, the son of farmer Thomas Espin and Elizabeth Butler. He was baptised there on 20 September 1767.

Espin was educated at the Free School at Wragby and later became a Fellow of the Society of Antiquarians.

== Career ==
In 1790 he was appointed Master of the Mapletoft School in Louth, established by Robert Mapletoft. Its official name was the Mathematical, Architectural, Nautical and Commercial Academy, and Espin had some cards printed to advertise his school. When the Priory was completed in 1818, the school was moved there. Ultimately, Espin was schoolmaster for over 30 years.

Espin was a talented artist and draughtsman, and he and his brother John Espin (1773–1822) travelled through Lincolnshire making drawings of buildings. Many of these illustrations were turned into engravings and published, particularly in Bartholomew Howlett's A Selection of Views in the County of Lincoln. Thomas Espin was also an accomplished watercolour artist.

His architectural talents were utilised by the Louth Corporation on several occasions. In 1805 he supervised the rebuilding of the belfry windows of St James's Church. In 1808 he produced a plan of Louth. In 1815 he was invited by the Corporation to submit plans for rebuilding of Louth Town Hall, but this was not undertaken. He had his proposed plans published as Plans and Elevations of the New Town Hall which was intended to have been erected in the Market-Place at Louth, Lincolnshire (1815). In 1818 he started on a summerhouse for himself, which became his mausoleum.

Espin was also a mathematician; he published Practical geometry consisting of definitions and some of the most useful geometrical problems selected for private use.

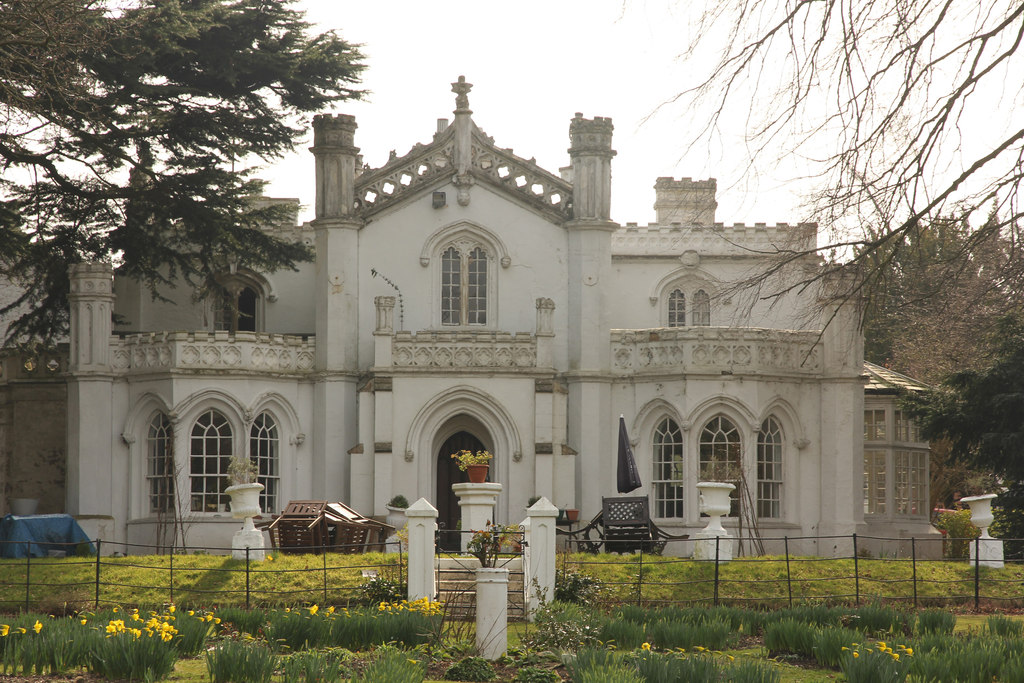
The Priory, Louth

=== Priory Hotel ===
Thomas Espin's most notable work was Louth's Gothic revival building Priory Hotel (then Priory Cottage), which he started in 1812. He laid out the surrounding parkland with Follies which were constructed from stonework taken from Louth Abbey. The Priory was completed in 1818.

According to Historic England, the Priory is "the very personal creation of [Espin], whose presence is especially felt in details such as the portrait headstops in the library and the built-in clock he set on his way upstairs at the time he wished for breakfast."

== Death and legacy ==
Thomas Espin died "very suddenly" at Louth on 14 December 1822. His obituary described him in glowing terms:

His reputation as an accurate delineator of nature and art, is established by several beautiful prints which have been executed by his drawings; and the taste displayed in the erection of his Priory Cottage at Louth, and in the disposition of his pleasure grounds and plantations adjoining, will render those objects lasting monuments of his classical skill and general knowledge of ancient architecture. He has left many friends, who will long regret the loss of a character so admirable, and so rarely met with in society.

He was buried on 19 December. After his death, his step-brother William Espin moved into the Priory and took over the running of the school.

Artist Thomas Wilkinson Wallis painted a portrait of Thomas Espin, dated 1895.

Espin is great grandfather of British astronomer T. H. E. C. Espin (1858–1934).
