= Eliot's Court Printing House =

Printing office in England

Eliot's Court Printing House was a sixteenth century printing office from 1584 to some time around 1674. It was located near the Old Bailey in London, England.
