= St Mary's Church, North Cockerington =

Coordinates: 53.4011°N 0.0556°E

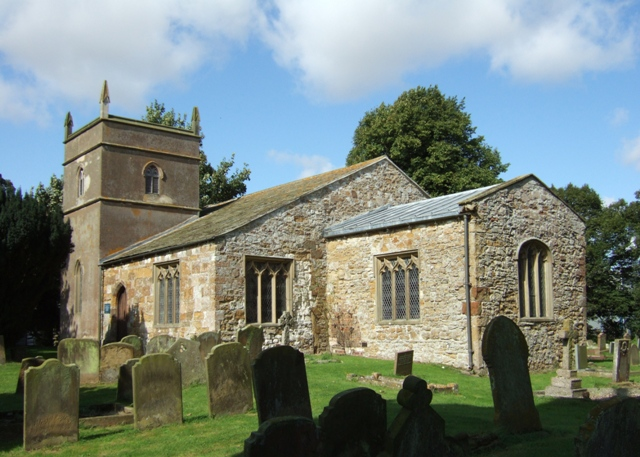
- St Mary's Church, North Cockerington, from the southeast

- Location in Lincolnshire
- OS grid reference: TF 367 914
- Location: Alvingham, Lincolnshire
- Country: England
- Denomination: Anglican
- Website: Churches Conservation Trust

Architecture
- Functional status: Redundant
- Heritage designation: Grade I
- Designated: 9 March 1967
- Architectural type: Church
- Style: Gothic, Gothic Revival

Specifications
- Materials: Greenstone, ironstone and limestone Lead and slate roofs

St Mary's Church is a redundant Anglican church in the village of Alvingham, adjacent to the village of North Cockerington, Lincolnshire, England. It is recorded in the National Heritage List for England as a designated Grade I listed building, and is under the care of the Churches Conservation Trust.

== History ==
The church stands a mile away from its parish, and shares its churchyard with the parish church of the adjoining village of Alvingham. Sharing a churchyard is unusual among English churches, but not unique. Another example is St Lawrence's Church, Evesham, which is also under the care of the Churches Conservation Trust. The reason in the cases of Alvingham and Evesham is the former existence of a monastery. St Mary's was the chapel for the Gilbertine Alvingham Priory which was sited adjacent to the parish church of Alvingham. Following the Dissolution of the Monasteries, the chapel was given to the village of North Cockerington to serve as their parish church, because their own church was in a bad condition.

The structure dates from the 11th century (which is earlier than the priory which was founded in the twelfth century). Additions and alterations were carried out in the late 12th century, in about 1300, and in the 14th century. The tower was added in the 19th century. The church was declared redundant in March 1981.

== Architecture ==
=== Exterior ===
St Mary's is constructed in a combination of greenstone, ironstone and limestone coursed rubble. The dressings are in limestone ashlar, there is some brickwork present, and part of the walls are rendered. The roofs are in lead and slate. Its plan consists of a nave with a south aisle under one roof, a smaller chancel, and a southwest tower. The tower is rendered and contains lancet windows on the west and south sides. The bell openings have Y-tracery, the parapet is plain, and there is a pinnacle at each corner. In the west wall of the nave, to the north of the tower, is a three-light window. There is another three-light window in the north wall of the nave, and in the north wall of the chancel is a small blocked round-headed window dating from the 11th century. The east window has three lights under a segmental head. In the south wall of the chancel, and in the east and south walls of the south aisle, are three-light windows with ogee heads. The doorway in the south wall of the south aisle has a pointed head.

=== Interior ===
Inside the church, the doorway leading to the tower has a pointed head. The south arcade dates from the 12th century. It has two bays with a round pier and pointed arches. Above the arcade is a painted inscription. The chancel arch dates from the 14th century, and also has a painted inscription above it. The font dates from the 13th century and consists of an octagonal bowl on an octagonal base. In the church are box pews from the 18th century. The other pews, the pulpit, and the choir stalls are from the 20th century. In the south aisle are fragments of a stone coffin bearing the effigy of a 14th-century knight, with a lion at his feet. There is a ring of three bells, two of which date from about 1499, and the other from 1634, but they are no longer ringable.

== See also ==
- List of churches preserved by the Churches Conservation Trust in the East of England
