= South Cockerington =

Village and civil parish in the East Lindsey district of Lincolnshire, England

Coordinates: 53.381795°N 0.075740°E

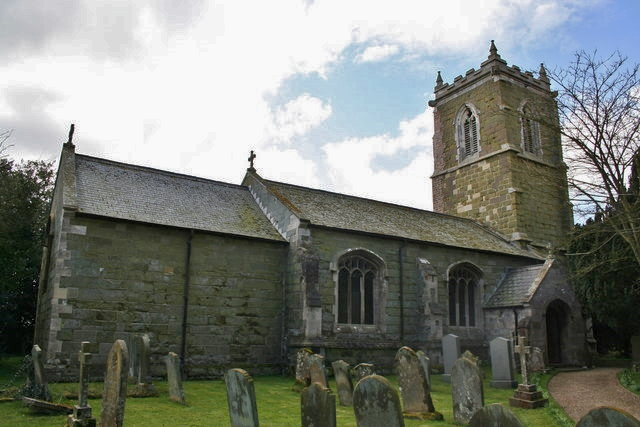
- Church of St Leonard, South Cockerington

- Location within Lincolnshire
- Population: 245 (2011)
- OS grid reference: TF381892
  - London: 135 mi (217 km) S
- District: East Lindsey
- Shire county: Lincolnshire
- Region: East Midlands
- Country: England
- Sovereign state: United Kingdom
- Post town: Louth
- Postcode district: LN11
- Police: Lincolnshire
- Fire: Lincolnshire
- Ambulance: East Midlands
- UK Parliament: Louth and Horncastle

South Cockerington is a village and civil parish in the East Lindsey district of Lincolnshire, England. It is situated approximately 4 miles (6 km) east from the market town of Louth.

The parish church is a Grade I listed building dedicated to Saint Leonard dating from the early 14th century, and restored in 1872–73. It is built from greenstone, limestone and brick. Inside there is a 15th-century font, and an alabaster monument to Sir Adrian Scrope who died in 1623, attributed to Epiphanius Evesham.

South Cockerington Hall was demolished in 1926.

In the village were four almshouses which are now a Grade II listed house, dating from about 1890, built in red brick.

== See also ==
- North Cockerington
