= Keddington =

Village and civil parish in the East Lindsey district of Lincolnshire, England

Coordinates: 53.377849°N 0.020656°E

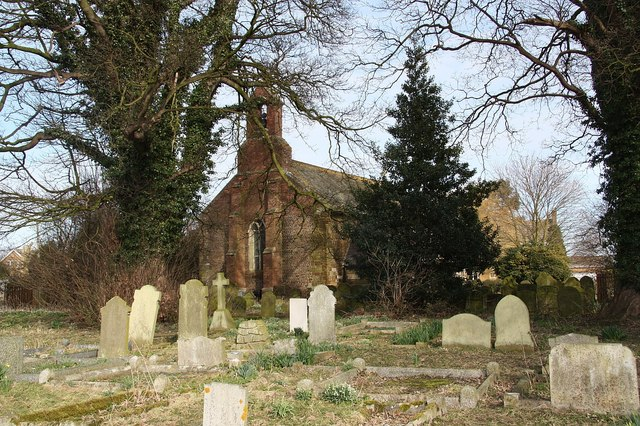
- St Margaret's Church, Keddington

- Location within Lincolnshire
- Population: 158 (Including Brackenborough and Stewton. 2011)
- OS grid reference: TF345886
  - London: 135 mi (217 km) S
- Civil parish: Keddington
- District: East Lindsey
- Shire county: Lincolnshire
- Region: East Midlands
- Country: England
- Sovereign state: United Kingdom
- Post town: LOUTH
- Postcode district: LN11
- Dialling code: 01507
- Police: Lincolnshire
- Fire: Lincolnshire
- Ambulance: East Midlands
- UK Parliament: Louth and Horncastle

Keddington is a village and civil parish in the East Lindsey district of Lincolnshire, England. It is 2 miles (3 km) north-east from Louth.

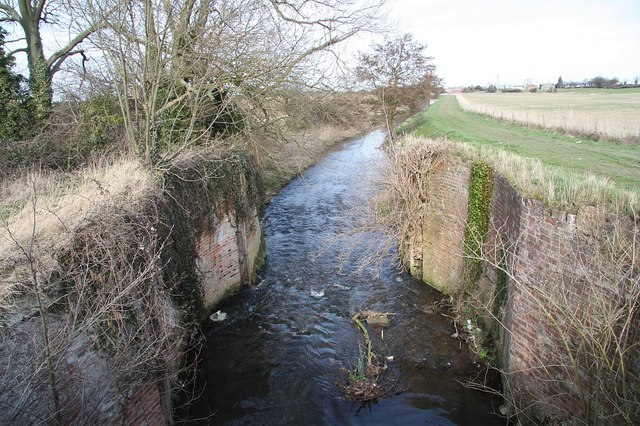
Keddington Grade II listed Ticklepenny Lock on Louth Canal

Keddington Grade II* listed Anglican parish church is dedicated to St Margaret. The church was restored in 1871–73. It has a 15th-century wooden eagle lectern, and a south door with transom. The eagle lectern is one of only six in England of its kind.

Other Grade II listed buildings include the remains of two locks on the disused Louth Canal, four farm houses, a cottage, and the remains of Louth Abbey. A Cistercian house, Louth Abbey was founded in 1139, and was dissolved at suppression in 1536. Still visible are earthworks and ruined chancel walls.
