= Zodiacus Vitae =

16th century textbook

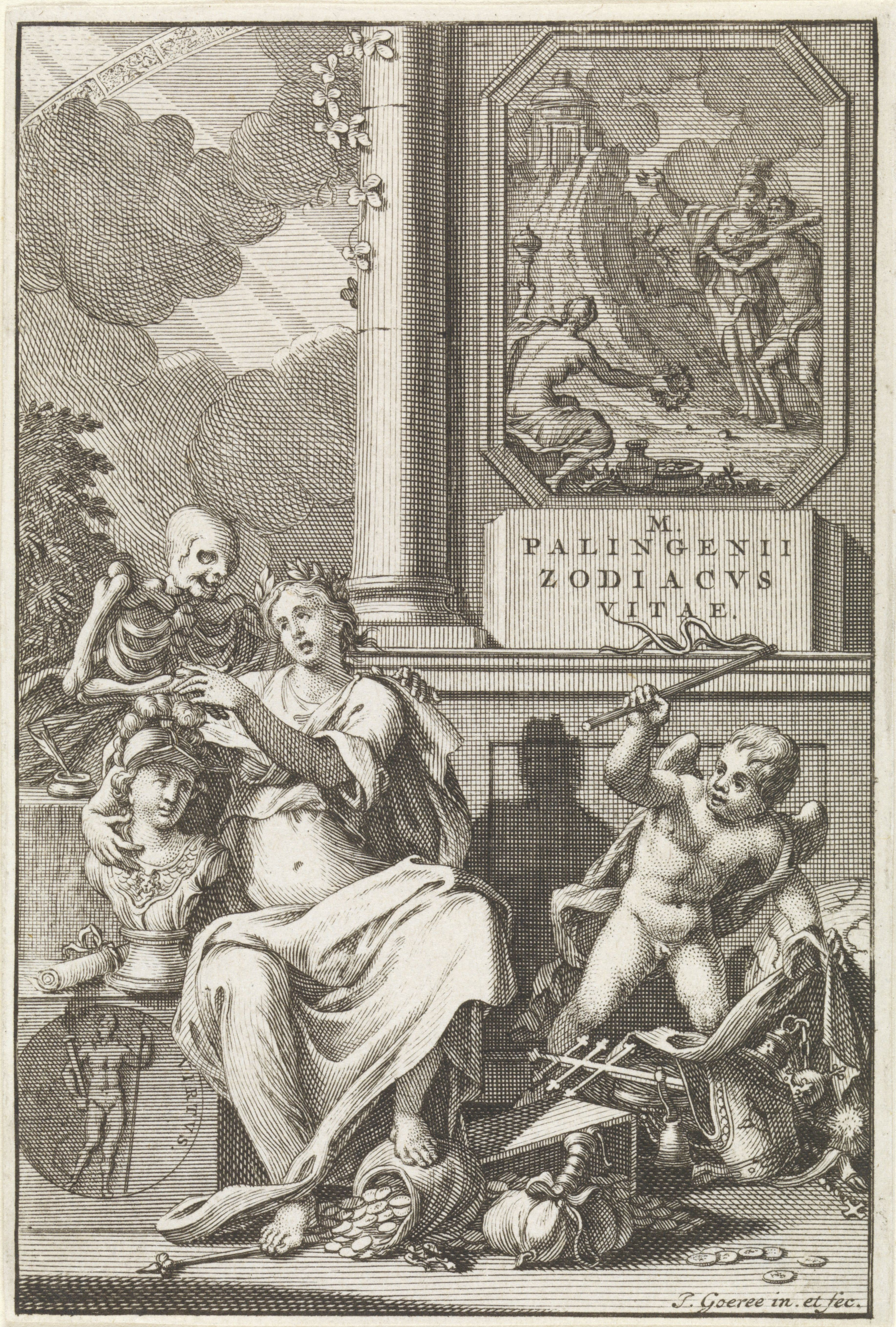

Zodiacus Vitae is a sixteenth century European book by Pier Angelo Manzolli published in various languages which had a widespread influence thanks to its wide use as a text book. Over sixty editions as well as translations into French, German and English. It was adopted as a school text both on the Continent and in England, being taught alongside Terence and Baptista Mantuanus in the third form.
