= North Cockerington =

Village in Lincolnshire, England

Coordinates: 53.396655°N 0.064822°E

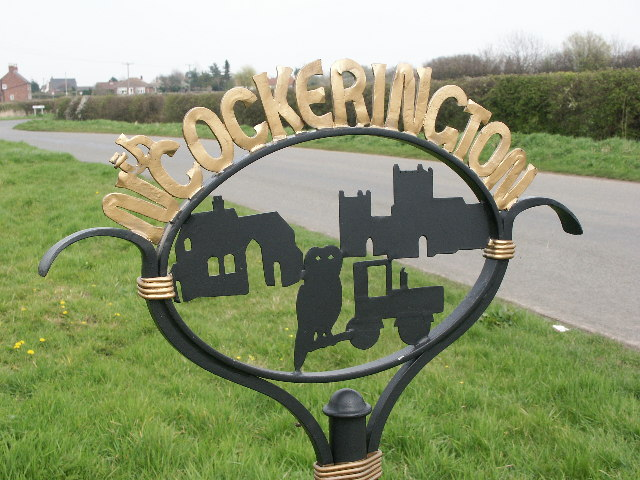
- Village signpost, Church Lane

- Location within Lincolnshire
- Population: 182 (2011)
- OS grid reference: TF373908
  - London: 130 mi (210 km) S
- District: East Lindsey
- Shire county: Lincolnshire
- Region: East Midlands
- Country: England
- Sovereign state: United Kingdom
- Post town: Louth
- Postcode district: LN11
- Police: Lincolnshire
- Fire: Lincolnshire
- Ambulance: East Midlands
- UK Parliament: Louth and Horncastle

North Cockerington is a small village and civil parish in the East Lindsey district of Lincolnshire, England. It is situated approximately 3 miles (5 km) north-east from Louth. North Cockerington was formerly known as Cockerington St Mary, distinguishing it from Cockerington St Leonard, now South Cockerington. In 1670 Sir Jarvis Scrope founded six tenements for poor people of North and South Cockerington.

The village has no shops or public houses. The former post office in Meadow Lane, once called Ashdene, is now Pump Cottage. The village school is North Cockerington Church of England Primary School. The school serves the villages of North and South Cockerington, Alvingham, Yarburgh as well as Louth itself.

Village population has fluctuated between 150 and 200 since 1801 and currently remains at just below 200, with an equal distribution of males and females.

The Greenwich Prime Zero meridian line passes through the village.

== St Mary's Church ==
St Mary's Church is a redundant Anglican church in the village of Alvingham, adjacent to North Cockerington. It is recorded in the National Heritage List for England as a designated Grade I listed building, and is under the care of the Churches Conservation Trust.
