= Donald Pleasence =

English actor (1919–1995)

Donald Pleasence OBE
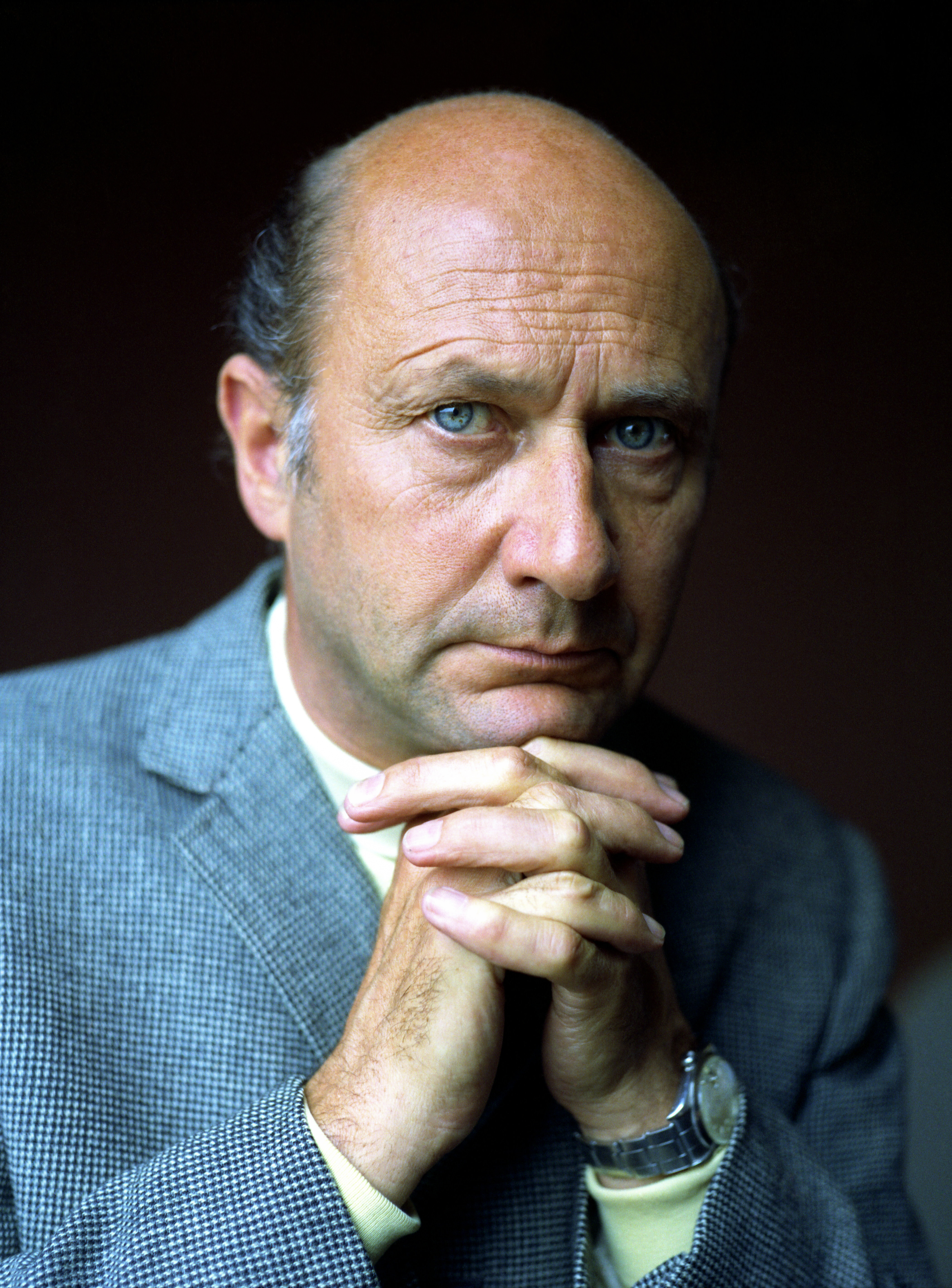
- Pleasence in 1973 by Allan Warren
- Born: Donald Henry Pleasence; 5 October 1919; Worksop, Nottinghamshire, England
- Died: 2 February 1995 (aged 75); Saint-Paul-de-Vence, Alpes-Maritimes, France
- Education: Ecclesfield School
- Occupation: Actor
- Years active: 1946–1995
- Spouses: Miriam Walker (m. 1941; div. 1958) Jose Crombie (m. 1959; div. 1970) Meira Shore (m. 1970; div. 1988) Linda J. Kentwood (m. 1988)
- Children: 5, including Angela
- Military career
- Allegiance: United Kingdom
- Branch: Royal Air Force
- Service years: 1940-46
- Rank: Flight lieutenant
- Unit: No. 166 Squadron
- Conflicts: World War II (POW)

Donald Henry Pleasence (/ˈplɛzəns/ PLEZ-ənss; 5 October 1919 – 2 February 1995) was an English actor. He was known for his "bald head and intense, staring eyes," and played more than 250 stage, film, and television roles across a nearly 60-year career.

Pleasence began his career on stage in the West End before having a screen career, which included starring in a 1954 BBC adaptation of George Orwell's Nineteen Eighty-Four, before playing numerous supporting and character roles, developing a reputation for playing "nervy, unstable characters" including Flight Lieutenant Colin Blythe in The Great Escape (1963), the villain Ernst Stavro Blofeld in the James Bond film You Only Live Twice (1967), SEN 5241 in THX 1138 (1971), and the deranged Clarence "Doc" Tydon in Wake in Fright (1971). He also maintained an acclaimed career on the Broadway stage.

Pleasence starred as psychiatrist Dr. Samuel Loomis in Halloween (1978) and four of its sequels, a role for which he was nominated for a Saturn Award for Best Actor. The series' popularity and critical success led to a resurgent career for Pleasence, who appeared in numerous American and European-produced horror and thriller films. He collaborated with Halloween director John Carpenter twice more, as the President of the United States in Escape from New York (1981) and as the Priest in Prince of Darkness (1987).

For his stage work, Pleasence won a Drama Desk Award and was nominated for four Tony Awards for Best Actor in a Play. He was appointed an Officer of the Order of the British Empire for his services to drama by Queen Elizabeth II in 1994.

== Early life ==
Pleasence was born in Worksop, Nottinghamshire, the son of Alice (née Armitage) and Thomas Stanley Pleasence, a railway station master. His grandfather was a railwayman who lived at Portland Place in Worksop, where Donald developed an interest in cricket.

He received his formal education at Crosby Junior School, known as Doncaster Road School, in Scunthorpe. He lived at 111 Frodingham Road for nine years. Aged seven he took part in his first play, in Scunthorpe, called Passers By.

He was brought up as a strict Methodist in the small village of Grimoldby, Lincolnshire, from the age of nine. With his older brother Ralph, both went to Eastfield Road school in Louth. He was in the local Scouts, the 4th United Methodist in Louth. He produced the school Christmas concert, in Louth, in his early teens.

His father was the stationmaster at Grimoldby railway station for five years, on the Mablethorpe loop railway. His parents were in the temperance society, and his mother was in the Grimoldby and Manby Women's Institute.

By early 1934 he had moved from Lincolnshire, where his father had been the LNER stationmaster from around early 1929. His father was the stationmaster at Ecclesfield. His father would die aged 78 in 1966 after moving to Teddington in the late 1950s.

He attended Ecclesfield Grammar School near Sheffield, which he said changed his life. Mr Clay was head of English, and with the headmaster, encouraged him, saying 'I owe virtually everything to them'. He developed his acting in Mr Clay's 'Wednesday Club' drama society. He has said that he was good at English but 'not much else'. Donald's father asked the headmaster to persuade his son to not choose to be an actor. A class friend Sam Hemingfield, would become a teacher, and later head of the sixth form at Ecclesfield School. Another friend was John Bertram, who would become a teacher, and head of English at Bradfield School.

For 18 months he worked as a booking clerk at Swinton railway station, with LNER and decided that he wanted to be a professional actor, taking up a placement with the Jersey Repertory Company in 1939. His first professional play at the Playhouse, in Jersey in July 1939 was as assistant stage manager with the Kent-Naismith Rep Company, where he played Hareton Earnshaw in Wuthering Heights.

Until 1941, he worked in repertory theatre. Until leaving rep, he had a rebellious nature, and often upset theatre directors and managers, leading to him being dismissed.

== Second World War ==
In December 1939, Pleasence initially refused conscription into the British Armed Forces, registering as a conscientious objector, but changed his stance in autumn 1940, after the attacks upon London by the Luftwaffe, and volunteered with the Royal Air Force.

He served as aircraft wireless-operator with No. 166 Squadron in Bomber Command, with which he flew almost sixty raids against the Axis Powers over occupied Europe, from RAF Kirmington.

On 31 August 1944, his Lancaster NE112 was shot down during an attack on Agenville, France, and he was captured and imprisoned in the German prisoner-of-war camp Stalag Luft I. He had been shot down on his 19th operation, bombing a V-1 flying bomb site.

Pleasence produced and acted in many plays for the entertainment of his fellow captives. In 1955 he said that 'joining the RAF was almost like being posted home'. Ten days before VE day, he was liberated by the Russians. The camp had mostly Americans.

After the war and his release, he was discharged from the RAF in 1946 as a Flight lieutenant.

Years later, he used his experiences in POW camps in his role in The Great Escape. While filming, Pleasence kindly offered advice to director John Sturges, to which he was politely asked to keep his "opinions" to himself. Later, when James Garner on set informed Sturges that Pleasence had been imprisoned in a German POW camp, Sturges requested his technical advice and input on historical accuracy from that point forward.

== Acting career ==
Returning to acting after the war, Pleasence resumed working in repertory theatre companies in Birmingham and Bristol.

His first production was The Brothers Karamazov, where he played the interrogator Mavriky, when one of the actors was ill at the Lyric Theatre (Hammersmith). It was his first 'unpleasant' acting role. He joined Birmingham Rep, where stayed for two years, then the Bristol Old Vic. He toured the US in 1950.

In the 1950s, Pleasence's stage work included performing as Willie Mossop in a 1952 production of Hobson's Choice at the Arts Theatre, London and as Dauphin in Jean Anouilh's The Lark (1956). In 1960, Pleasence gained excellent notices as the tramp in Harold Pinter's The Caretaker at the Arts Theatre, a role he would again play in a 1990 revival. Other stage work in the 1960s included Anouilh's Poor Bitos (1963–64) and Robert Shaw's The Man in the Glass Booth (1967), for which he won the London Variety Award for Stage Actor of the Year in 1968. Pleasence's later stage work included performing in a double bill of Pinter plays, The Basement and Tea Party, at the Duchess Theatre in 1970.

=== Television ===
Pleasence made his television debut in I Want to Be a Doctor (1946). He received positive critical attention for his role as Syme in the BBC version of Nineteen Eighty-Four (1954) from the novel by George Orwell. The adaptation was by Nigel Kneale and featured Peter Cushing in the lead role of Winston Smith.

Pleasence played Prince John in several episodes of the ITV series The Adventures of Robin Hood (1956–1958), starring Richard Greene in the title role. He appeared twice with Patrick McGoohan in the British spy series Danger Man, in episodes "Position of Trust" (1960) and "Find and Return" (1961). Pleasence's first appearance in the United States was in an episode of The Twilight Zone, playing an ageing teacher at a boys' school in the episode "The Changing of the Guard" (1962). In 1963, he appeared in an episode titled "The Man with the Power" of The Outer Limits. In 1966, he also guest starred in an episode entitled "With Strings Attached" of The Fugitive.

In 1973, Pleasence played a murdering wine specialist in an episode of Columbo entitled "Any Old Port in a Storm". Also that year, he played a supporting role in David Winters' musical television adaptation of Dr. Jekyll and Mr. Hyde.

He also portrayed a murderer captured by Mrs. Columbo in "Murder Is a Parlor Game" (1979). In 1978, he played a scout, Sam Purchas in an adaptation of James A. Michener's Centennial. Pleasence starred alongside his daughter Angela Pleasence, who played his onscreen daughter Susanas, he was the Reverend Septimus Harding, in the BBC's TV series The Barchester Chronicles (1982).

He hosted the 1981 Halloween episode (with music guest Fear) of Saturday Night Live.

In 1986, Pleasence joined Ronald Lacey and Polly Jo Pleasence for the television thriller Into the Darkness.

In 1988, Pleasence and Michael Nader portrayed villains in The Great Escape II: The Untold Story, which costar Christopher Reeve explained as not being a remake of the 1963 original film and being based on Paul Brickhill's non-fiction account The Great Escape. Noting his involvement in the original film, Joan Hanauer wrote that Pleasence had "graduated to an S.S. villain, and he is a marvel of soft-spoken, almost finicky evil."

=== Film ===
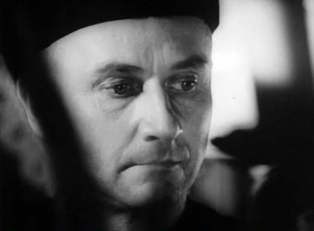
Pleasence in the trailer for the film Eye of the Devil (1966).

Pleasence made his big-screen debut with The Beachcomber (1954). Some notable early roles include Parsons in 1984 (1956), and minor roles opposite Alec Guinness in Barnacle Bill (1957), and Dirk Bogarde in The Wind Cannot Read (1958). In Tony Richardson's film of Look Back in Anger (1959), he plays a vindictive market inspector opposite Richard Burton. In the same year, Pleasence starred in the horror films Circus of Horrors (1959), directed by Sidney Hayers, playing the role of Vanet, the owner of a circus. He starred in The Flesh and the Fiends, as the real-life murderer William Hare, alongside Peter Cushing, George Rose and Billie Whitelaw.

Characterised by a bald head, a penetrating stare, and an intense voice, usually quiet but capable of a piercing scream, he specialised in portraying insane, fanatical, or evil characters; In 1959, he was awarded Best Actor by the Society of Film and Television Arts Television Awards for his work the previous year.

He played the title role in Dr Crippen (1962), the frontier prophet Oracle Jones in Hallelujah Trail, the double agent Dr Michaels in the science-fiction film Fantastic Voyage (1966), the white trader who sells guns to the Cheyenne Indians in the revisionist western Soldier Blue (1970), the mad German psychoanalyst with Bud Spencer–Terence Hill in Watch Out, We're Mad! (1974), Nazi leader Heinrich Himmler in The Eagle Has Landed (1976), and the Bond arch-villain Ernst Stavro Blofeld in You Only Live Twice (1967), the first film in which Blofeld's face is clearly seen. His interpretation of the character has become predominant in popular culture considering the popularity of the comic villain, Dr. Evil in the successful Austin Powers film series, which primarily parodies it.

He starred in the crime drama Hell is a City (1960), shot in Manchester, he starred opposite Stanley Baker, while he was memorably cast in as the "horrible-looking zombie" solicitor opposite Shirley Eaton, Sid James, Kenneth Connor and Dennis Price, in the horror comedy What a Carve Up! (1961).

He appeared as the mild-mannered and good-natured POW forger Colin Blythe in the film The Great Escape (1963), who discovers that he is slowly going blind, but nonetheless participates in the mass break-out, only to be shot down by German soldiers because he is unable to see them. Variety highlighted Pleasence and Richard Attenborough as giving some of the better performances in the film, Pleasence specifically being praised for having the most moving portrayal and depicting "the film's most touching character."

Pleasence played Lucifer in the religious epic The Greatest Story Ever Told (1965). He was one of many stars who were given cameos throughout the film. He also acted in Roman Polanski's Cul-de-sac (1966), in which he portrayed the love-sodden husband of a much younger French wife (Françoise Dorléac). He ventured successfully into American cowboy territory, playing a sadistic self-styled preacher who goes after stoic Charlton Heston in the Western Will Penny (1968).

Pleasence played, as he did in The Great Escape, an uncharacteristically sympathetic role, this time, as an old-school German general involved in a plot to assassinate Adolf Hitler in The Night of the Generals (1967).

Pleasence was the original choice of Michael Reeves for the title role of the folk horror film Witchfinder General (a.k.a. The Conqueror Worm, 1968) but once American International Pictures became involved in the production, they insisted that their contract star, Vincent Price, be given the lead, and Pleasence was dropped from the film.

In 1971, Pleasence delivered a tour de force performance in the role of an alcoholic Australian doctor in Ted Kotcheff's nightmarish outback drama Wake in Fright. A lost film for many decades, Wake in Fright is now considered a pivotal film of both the Australian New Wave and the Ozploitation cycle, earning praise from contemporary critics for Kotcheff's direction and the cast's performances.

Pleasence portrayed SEN 5241 in THX 1138 (1971), opposite Robert Duvall which was the directorial debut of George Lucas. The next year he appeared as an eccentric, tea-obsessed police inspector alongside Norman Rossington and Christopher Lee in the cult horror film Death Line. A few years later, he portrayed antagonist Lucas Deranian, in Walt Disney's Escape to Witch Mountain (1975), and as Nicolai Dalchimsky, the Russian seeking to start a war between the United States and the Soviet Union in Telefon (1977).

Pleasence as Dr. Samuel Loomis.

Pleasence appeared as Dr. Samuel Loomis in John Carpenter's horror film Halloween (1978). The film was a major success and was considered the highest grossing independent film of its time, earning accolades as a classic of the horror genre. He also played the teacher, Kantorek in All Quiet on the Western Front (1979), Dr. Kobras in The Pumaman (1980), and the held-hostage President of the United States in Escape from New York (1981). The rather sinister accent which Pleasence employed in this and other films may be credited to the elocution lessons he had as a child. He reprised his Dr. Sam Loomis role in Halloween II (1981), Halloween 4: The Return of Michael Myers (1988), Halloween 5: The Revenge of Michael Myers (1989), and Halloween: The Curse of Michael Myers (1995).

Pleasence, Daria Nicolodi, and Jennifer Connelly starred in Dario Argento's Phenomena (1985), where Pleasence portrayed a wheelchair-using forensic entomologist. Although Austin Trunick of Under the Radar criticised Connelly for not being an active heroine, he cited "a lot of nice interaction between Connelly and Pleasence's eccentric character" as a positive tradeoff. Later that year, Pleasence played a retiring inspector who investigates the disappearance of the sister of Tom Schanley's character in Nothing Underneath. JA Kerswell called Pleasence's role "clichéd" for the actor while also praising his presence as "a welcome bonus." The reviewer from Horror Society wrote of liking Schanley and Pleasence "but the story is the main focus here and not the cast which is a bit of a shame because both did fantastic jobs." Operation Nam was Pleasence's sole film appearance in 1986, playing "a minor part as a priest" who services Vietnam soldiers.

Pleasence collaborated with Carpenter again when he starred in Prince of Darkness (1987), where he played a priest who seeks the aid of a professor and a few of the latter's quantum physics students to uncover the mystery of a glowing liquid in a canister. Though mixed about the film, Starburst praised Pleasence's performance, admitting that to them, "there are very few sights in genre cinema as marvelous as seeing Pleasence delivering an intense, slightly erratic monologue, and he gets plenty to sink his teeth into here." Megan Summers asserted that Pleasence brought "his standard emotional prowess and psychological stability to his role" in the film, and Michael Wilmington declared Pleasence and Victor Wong as "both fine; these two know how to make the most of shallow excess."

In 1988, Pleasence played a priest in the Italian horror film Vampire in Venice, (a.k.a. Nosferatu in Venice), a quasi-sequel to Werner Herzog's Nosferatu the Vampyre (1979).

Pleasence admired Sir Laurence Olivier, with whom he worked on-stage in the 1950s, and later on the film version of Dracula (1979). Two years earlier, Pleasence did an amusingly broad impersonation of Olivier in the guise of a horror-film actor called "Valentine De'ath" in the film The Uncanny (1977). According to the film critic Kim Newman on a DVD commentary for Halloween II, the reason for Pleasence's lengthy filmography was that he never turned down any role that was offered.

=== Spoken records and voice-overs ===
During the early 1960s, Pleasence recorded several children's-story records on the Atlas Record label. These were marketed as the Talespinners series in the United Kingdom. They were also released in the United States as Tale Spinners for Children by United Artists. The stories included Don Quixote and the Brave Little Tailor. He also wrote, directed and narrated Scouse the Mouse in 1977.

Pleasence provided the voice-over for the British public information film, The Spirit of Dark and Lonely Water (1973). The film, intended to warn children of the dangers of playing near water, attained notoriety for allegedly giving children nightmares.

=== Books ===
Pleasence was the author of the children's book Scouse the Mouse (1977) (London: New English Library), which was animated by Canadian animator/film director Gerald Potterton (a friend of the actor, who directed him in the Canadian film The Rainbow Boys (1973), retitled The Rainbow Gang for VHS release in the United States) and also adapted into a children's recording (Polydor Records, 1977) with Ringo Starr voicing the book's title character, Scouse the Mouse.

In his book British Film Character Actors (1982), Terence Pettigrew describes Pleasence as "a potent combination of eyes and voice. The eyes are mournful but they can also be sinister or seedy or just plain nutty. He has the kind of piercing stare which lifts enamel off saucepans."

== Honours ==
Pleasence was appointed an Officer of the Order of the British Empire for his services to the acting profession by Queen Elizabeth II in 1994.

== Personal life ==
Pleasence married four times and had five daughters from his first three marriages, including Angela. His last marriage was to Linda Kentwood (m. 1988–1995; his death).

In the late 1970s, he lived near the eastern side of Kew Bridge. He lived in the south of France for a number of years, up until his death.

== Death ==
On 2 February 1995, Pleasence died at age 75 at his home in Saint-Paul-de-Vence, France, from complications of heart failure following heart valve replacement surgery. His body was cremated.

== Legacy ==
The 1995 film Halloween: The Curse of Michael Myers was dedicated to Donald Pleasence. The 1998 film Halloween H20: 20 Years Later also features a dedication to Pleasence in the end credits, with voice actor Tom Kane providing a voice-over for Loomis in the film. In the 2018 film, Halloween, comedian Colin Mahan voiced Loomis. In the 2021 film Halloween Kills, Tom Jones, Jr. played Loomis, wearing prosthetic make-up to resemble Pleasence. Loomis' voice was again provided by Mahan.

Dr. Evil, the character played by Mike Myers in the Austin Powers comedy films (1997–2002), and Doctor Claw from Inspector Gadget are parodies of Pleasence's performance as Blofeld in You Only Live Twice.

== Filmography ==
=== Film ===
Year	Title	Role	Notes
1954	Private's Progress	Scotland Yard Detective	Uncredited
1954	The Beachcomber	Tromp	
1955	Orders Are Orders	Corporal Martin	Credited as Donald Plesance
1955	Value for Money	Limpy	
1956	1984	Parsons	
1956	The Black Tent	Ali	
1957	The Man in the Sky	Crabtree	
1957	Manuela	Evans	
1957	Barnacle Bill	Cashier	
1958	A Tale of Two Cities	John Barsad	
1958	Heart of a Child	Spiel	
1958	The Wind Cannot Read	Doctor	
1958	The Man Inside	Organ-Grinder	
1958	The Two-Headed Spy	General Hardt	
1959	Look Back in Anger	Hurst	
1959	Killers of Kilimanjaro	Captain	
1959	The Battle of the Sexes	Irwin Hoffman	
1960	The Shakedown	Jessel Brown	
1960	The Flesh and the Fiends	William Hare	
1960	Circus of Horrors	Vanet	
1960	Hell Is a City	Gus Hawkins	
1960	Sons and Lovers	Pappleworth	
1960	The Big Day	Victor Partridge	
1960	Suspect	Parsons / Bill Brown	
1960	The Hands of Orlac	Graham Coates	
1961	No Love for Johnnie	Roger Renfrew	
1961	The Wind of Change	'Pop' Marley	
1961	A Story of David	Nabal	
1961	Spare the Rod	Mr. Jenkins	
1961	What a Carve Up!	Everett Sloane	
1962	The Inspector	Sergeant Wolters	
1963	The Caretaker	Mac Davies / Bernard Jenkins	
1963	The Great Escape	Flight Lieutenant Colin Blythe, "The Forger"	
1963	Dr. Crippen	Dr. Crippen	
1965	The Greatest Story Ever Told	Satan	
1965	The Hallelujah Trail	Oracle Jones	
1966	Cul-de-sac	George	
1966	Eye of the Devil	Pere Dominic	
1966	Fantastic Voyage	Dr. Michaels	
1967	The Night of the Generals	General Kahlenberge	
1967	You Only Live Twice	Ernst Stavro Blofeld	
1967	Matchless	Gregori Andreanu	
1968	Will Penny	Preacher Quint	
1968	Sleep Is Lovely	Clive	
1968	Creature of Comfort	James Thorne	
1969	Arthur? Arthur!	Arthur Brownjohn	
1969	The Madwoman of Chaillot	Prospector	
1970	Soldier Blue	Isaac Q. Cumber	
1971	THX 1138	SEN 5241	
1971	Wake in Fright	Clarence 'Doc' Tydon	
1972	Death Line	Inspector Calhoun	
1972	The Jerusalem File	Major Samuels	
1972	The Pied Piper	Baron	
1972	Henry VIII and His Six Wives	Thomas Cromwell	
1972	Innocent Bystanders	Loomis	
1972	Wedding in White	Jim Dougall	
1973	Kidnapped	Ebenezer Balfour	
1973	The Rainbow Boys	Ralph Logan	
1973	Lonely Water	The Spirit (voice)	Short film
1973	Malachi's Cove	Malachi	
1973	Tales That Witness Madness	Professor Tremayne	
1974	From Beyond the Grave	Jim Underwood	Segment: "An Act of Kindness"
1974	Watch Out, We're Mad!	Doctor	
1974	The Black Windmill	Cedric Harper	
1974	House of the Damned	Martin Zayas	
1974	The Mutations	Professor Nolter	
1974	Barry McKenzie Holds His Own	Count Plasma	
1975	The Count of Monte Cristo	Baron Danglars	
1975	Escape to Witch Mountain	Lucas Deranian	
1975	I Don't Want to Be Born	Dr. Finch	
1975	Journey into Fear	Kuvelti	
1975	Hearts of the West	A.J. Neitz	
1976	Trial by Combat	Sir Giles Marley	
1976	Land of the Minotaur	Father Roche	
1976	Goldenrod	John Tyler Jones	
1976	The Passover Plot	Pontius Pilate	
1976	The Last Tycoon	Boxley	
1976	The Eagle Has Landed	Heinrich Himmler	
1977	The Uncanny	Valentine De'ath	Segment: "Hollywood 1936"
1977	Oh, God!	Dr. Harmon	
1977	Telefon	Nikolai Dalchimsky	
1978	Blood Relatives	James Doniac	
1978	Tomorrow Never Comes	Dr. Todd	
1978	Night Creature	Axel MacGregor	
1978	Sgt. Pepper's Lonely Hearts Club Band	B.D. Hoffler	
1978	Power Play	Blair	
1978	L'Ordre et la sécurité du monde	Rothko	
1978	Halloween	Dr. Sam Loomis	
1979	Jigsaw	Albert Rumpelmayer	
1979	Good Luck, Miss Wyckoff	Dr. Steiner	
1979	Dracula	Dr. Jack Seward	
1979	Jaguar Lives!	General Villanova	
1980	The Pumaman	Dr. Kobras	
1980	The Monster Club	Pickering	
1981	Escape from New York	The President of the United States	
1981	Halloween II	Dr. Sam Loomis	
1981	Race for the Yankee Zephyr	Gilbert 'Gibbie' Carson	
1982	Alone in the Dark	Dr. Leo Bain	
1983	To Kill a Stranger	Colonel Kostik	
1983	Warrior of the Lost World	Prossor	
1983	The Devonsville Terror	Dr. Warley	
1984	Frankenstein's Great Aunt Tillie	Baron Victor Frankenstein	
1984	Where Is Parsifal?	Mackintosh	
1984	The Ambassador	Eretz	
1984	A Breed Apart	J.P. Whittier	
1984	Terror in the Aisles	Himself (host)	
1985	Phenomena	John McGregor	
1985	The Treasure of the Amazon	Klaus Von Blantz	
1985	Nothing Underneath	Inspector Danesi	
1986	Operation Nam	Father Lenoir	
1987	Warrior Queen	Clodius	
1987	Specters	Professor Lasky	
1987	Double Target	Senator Blaster	
1987	Ground Zero	Prosper Gaffney	
1987	Django 2	Gunn	
1987	Prince of Darkness	Priest	
1987	To Kill a Stranger	Colonel Kostik	
1987	Animali metropolitani	Professor Livingstone	
1988	Phantom of Death	Inspector Datti	
1988	The Commander	Henry Carlson	
1988	Last Platoon	Colonel B. Abrams	
1988	Vampire in Venice	Don Alvise	
1988	Hanna's War	Captain Thomas Rosza	
1988	Halloween 4: The Return of Michael Myers	Dr. Sam Loomis	
1989	The House of Usher	Walter Usher	
1989	Ten Little Indians	Judge Lawrence Wargrave	
1989	Paganini Horror	Mr. Pickett	
1989	River of Death	Heinrich Spaatz	
1989	Halloween 5: The Revenge of Michael Myers	Dr. Sam Loomis	
1989	Casablanca Express	Colonel Bats	
1990	Buried Alive	Dr. Schaeffer	
1990	American Rickshaw	Reverend Mortom	
1991	L'avvoltoio può attendere	Aaron Shalik	
1991	Millions	Ripa	
1991	Shadows and Fog	Doctor	
1992	Dien Bien Phu	Howard Simpson	
1993	The Princess and the Cobbler	Phido the Vulture (voice)	
1993	The Big Freeze	Soup Slurper	
1993	The Hour of the Pig	Pincheon	
1995	Halloween: The Curse of Michael Myers	Dr. Sam Loomis	Posthumous release
1995	Safe Haven	The Sailor	Posthumous release
1996	Fatal Frames	Professor Robertson	Posthumous release

=== Television ===
==== TV series ====
Year	Title	Role	Notes
1952–1959	Sunday Night Theatre	Various roles	6 episodes
1954	Nineteen Eighty-Four	Syme	
1955	The Grove Family	Monsieur Paul	Episode: "Parlez-Vous Français?"
1956	The Adventures of Robin Hood	Prince John	4 episodes
1956–1959	ITV Playhouse	Various roles	6 episodes
1957	Assignment Foreign Legion	Commandant	Episode: "The Coward"
1957–1967	Armchair Theatre	Various roles	8 episodes
1959	The Killing Stones	Jakob Kleiber	Episode: "The Carefulness of Kleiber"
1959	The Scarf	Detective Inspector Harry Yates	6 episodes
1959	The Adventures of William Tell	The Spider	Episode: "The Spider"
1960	The Four Just Men	Paul Koster	Episode: "The Survivor"
1960	Interpol Calling	Karl Haussman	Episode: "The Absent Assassin"
1960	Rendezvous	Potter	Episode: "The Dodo"
1960–1961	Danger Man	Nikolides / Captain Aldrich	2 episodes
1960–1965	Armchair Mystery Theatre	Host / Ambrose	Episode: "Ambrose"
1961	Alcoa Presents: One Step Beyond	Harvey Laurence	Episode: "The Confession"
1961	Walt Disney's Wonderful World of Color	Captain Pinski	Episode: "The Horsemasters"
1962	The Twilight Zone	Professor Ellis Fowler	Episode: "The Changing of the Guard"
1963	The Outer Limits	Professor Harold Finley	Episode: "The Man with the Power"
1964	Espionage	Escalon	Episode: "The Liberators"
1965	The Defenders	Dr. Byron Saul	Episode: "Fires of the Mind"
1966	The Fugitive	Max Pfeiffer	Episode: "With Strings Attached"
1966	The Wednesday Play	The Head Waiter	Episode: "The Head Waiter"
1967–1968	Thirty-Minute Theatre	J.G. / Richard Pratt	2 episodes
1971	The Rivals of Sherlock Holmes	Carnacki	Episode: "The Horse of the Invisible"
1971–1983	Play for Today	Samuel Johnson / Gerry Muddiman / Tom	3 episodes
1972	Hawaii Five-O	Hans Vogler	Episode: "The Ninety-Second War: Part II"
1972	The Man Outside	Victor Cobb	Episode: "A Glass of Snake Wine"
1972	Police Surgeon	Jerry Hahn	Episode: "Lady X"
1973	Columbo	Adrian Carsini	Episode: "Any Old Port in a Storm"
1973	Orson Welles Great Mysteries	Cawser	Episode: "Captain Rogers"
1974	Performance	Wilhelm Voigt	Episode "The Captain of Köpenick"
1975	Shades of Greene	Puckler	Episode: "The Root of All Evil"
1976	Peep Show	Max	Episode: "Death"
1976	Laurence Olivier Presents	Nat Jeffcote	Episode: "Hindle Wakes"
1979	Mrs. Columbo	Ian A. Morly	Episode: "Murder Is a Parlor Game"
1981	Dick Turpin	Ignatius Slake	2 episodes
1981	Saturday Night Live	Himself (Host)	Episode: "Donald Pleasence/Fear"
1982	The Barchester Chronicles	Reverend Septimus Harding	7 episodes
1987	Basements	Mr. Kidd	Episode: "The Room"
1988	The Ray Bradbury Theater	George Hill	Episode: "Punishment Without Crime"
1992	Lovejoy	Karel Redl	Episode: "The Prague Sun"
1993	Screen Two	Victor Harty	Episode: "Femme Fatale"

==== TV films and miniseries ====
Year	Title	Role
1952	The Dybbuk	2nd Batlon
1954	Montserrat	Juan Alvarez
1954	The Face of Love	Alex
1958	I Spy	Mr. Frute
1958	Granite	A Nameless Man
1959	The Traitor	Grantley Caypor
1967	The Diary of Anne Frank	Mr. Dusseli
1973	Dr. Jekyll and Mr. Hyde	Fred Smudge
1974	Occupations	Christo Kabak
1975	The Count of Monte Cristo	Baron Danglars
1977	Jesus of Nazareth	Melchior
1977	The Dark Secret of Harvest Home	Narrator
1978	The Defection of Simas Kudirka	Captain Vladimir Popov
1978	The Bastard	Solomon Sholto
1978–1979	Centennial	Sam Purchas
1979	All Quiet on the Western Front	Kantorek
1979	Gold of the Amazon Women	Clarence Blasko
1979	The French Atlantic Affair	Max Dechambre
1979	Better Late Than Never	Colonel Riddle
1980	The Ghost Sonata	The Old Man
1980	Blade on the Feather	Professor Jason Cavendish
1982	Witness for the Prosecution	Mr. Myers
1984	Master of the Game	Salomon Van der Merwe
1984	Arch of Triumph	Haake
1985	Black Arrow	Sir Oliver Oates
1987	Scoop	Lord Copper
1988	The Great Escape II: The Untold Story	Dr. Absalon
1989	Agatha Christie's Miss Marple: A Caribbean Mystery	Jason Rafiel
1991	Women in Arms	Dreyfuss
1995	Signs and Wonders	Cornelius Van Damm

== Bibliography ==
- Pleasence, Donald (1980). "Contributor". David Jacob's Book of Celebrities' Jokes & Anecdotes. By Jacobs, David. Robson Books. p. 120. ISBN 0860511251.

== Awards and nominations ==
Award	Year	Category	Work	Result	Ref.
Australian Film Institute Awards	1987	Best Actor in a Supporting Role	Ground Zero	Nominated	
Society of Film and Television Arts Television Awards	1959	Best Actor	—N/a	Won	
Drama Desk Awards	1969	Outstanding Performance	The Man in the Glass Booth	Won	
Primetime Emmy Awards	1978	Outstanding Performance by a Supporting Actor in a Comedy or Drama Special	The Defection of Simas Kudirka	Nominated	
Saturn Awards	1980	Best Supporting Actor	Dracula	Nominated	
Saturn Awards	1982	Best Actor	Halloween II	Nominated	
Tony Awards	1962	Best Actor in a Leading Role in a Play	The Caretaker	Nominated	
Tony Awards	1965	Best Actor in a Leading Role in a Play	Poor Bitos	Nominated	
Tony Awards	1969	Best Actor in a Leading Role in a Play	The Man in the Glass Booth	Nominated	
Tony Awards	1972	Best Actor in a Leading Role in a Play	Wise Child	Nominated	
