= Willoughby railway station =

Former railway station in Lincolnshire, England

Coordinates: 53.2248°N 0.1951°E

Willoughby
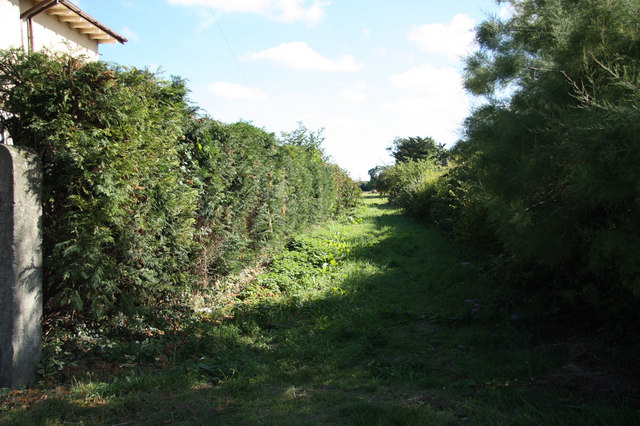
- The site of the station in 2010

General information
- Location: Willoughby, East Lindsey; England
- Platforms: 3

Other information
- Status: Disused

History
- Opened: 3 September 1848; 177 years ago
- Closed: 2 May 1966; 59 years ago (Closed to goods traffic); 5 October 1970; 55 years ago (Closed to passenger traffic)
- Original company: East Lincolnshire Railway
- Pre-grouping: Great Northern Railway
- Post-grouping: London and North Eastern Railway; Eastern Region of British Railways

Key dates
- 23 September 1886; 139 years ago: Becomes a junction station
- 6 October 1886; 139 years ago: Relocated 120 m (390 ft) north
Location

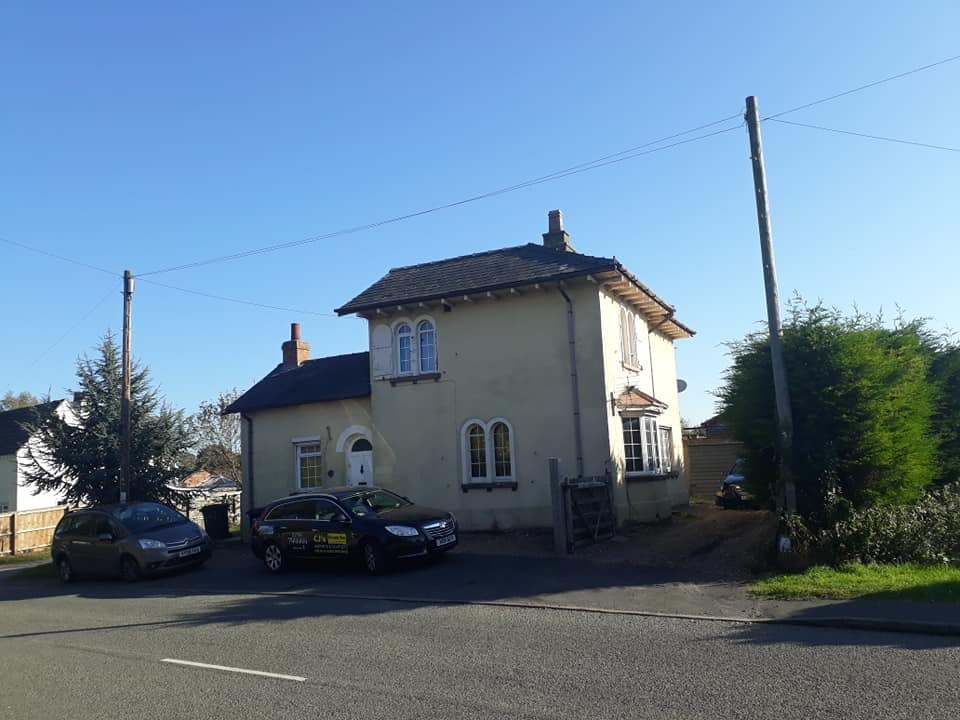
Station House at Willoughby, now a private residence

Willoughby was a railway station on the East Lincolnshire Railway which served the village of Willoughby in Lincolnshire between 1848 and 1970. In 1886, a second larger station replaced the first following the opening of a junction with the Sutton and Willoughby Railway to Sutton-on-Sea and later Mablethorpe. The withdrawal of goods facilities at Willoughby took place in 1966, followed by passenger services in 1970. All lines through the station are now closed.

== History ==
The station was opened on 3 September 1848 to serve the village of Willoughby. It was constructed by Peto and Betts civil engineering contractors who, in January 1848, had taken over the contract to construct the section of the East Lincolnshire Railway between Louth and Boston from John Waring and Sons. This section was the last to be completed in September 1848 at an agreed cost of £123,000 (equivalent to £15.6 million as of 2023). Two facing platforms were constructed to the south of a level crossing, adjacent to the stationmaster's house which provided the only passenger facilities. A goods yard to the south of the station was served by two sidings: one passing through a brick-built engine shed and a loading dock, while the other served an end dock.

On 28 July 1884, the Sutton and Willoughby Railway was authorised to construct a line to Willoughby from Sutton-on-Sea on the Lincolnshire coast. Opening of the line from the coast on 23 September 1886 resulted in the construction of a new station at Willoughby in 1886–7. A new station would be built to the north of the level crossing in order to facilitate the construction of a junction between the East Lincolnshire Railway and the new line. To this end, land to the north of the crossing was purchased from the estate of Baron Willoughby de Eresby. The Great Northern Railway, which had absorbed the East Lincolnshire Railway, requested that the Sutton and Willoughby Railway pay their share of the construction costs, which amounted to £3,966 (equivalent to £560,000 as of 2023). The new station opened on 4 October 1886 and the old one closed two days later, with the stationhouse being retained. The Great Northern was later to take over the Sutton and Willoughby Railway in 1902, which by that time had extended to Mablethorpe to join the Louth and East Coast Railway, the latter being absorbed by the Great Northern in 1908.

The new station was provided with three platform faces: a bay platform with a run-round loop for the Sutton line, a single platform for down services on the main line and an island platform for up services. A canopy covered both the bay and up platform. The main station buildings, consisting of a parcels office, stationmaster's office, ticket office, general waiting room, ladies' waiting room, porters' room and toilets, were situated on the up platform and branch platform. Another ladies' waiting room was located on the down platform. Two signal boxes were brought into service: one controlling the junction and bay and one controlling the crossing and goods yard movements. The second box was located behind the down platform, near a footbridge over the main line and the level crossing. The goods yard remained in its original position, but was provided with a goods shed and four sidings (two on either side of the line): one set was for coal traffic and the other for milk traffic sent out daily by the Clover Dairy factory. In 1937, milk was dispatched to Hull Paragon in a van picked up by the 4:19 pm Grimsby to Peterborough North passenger working.

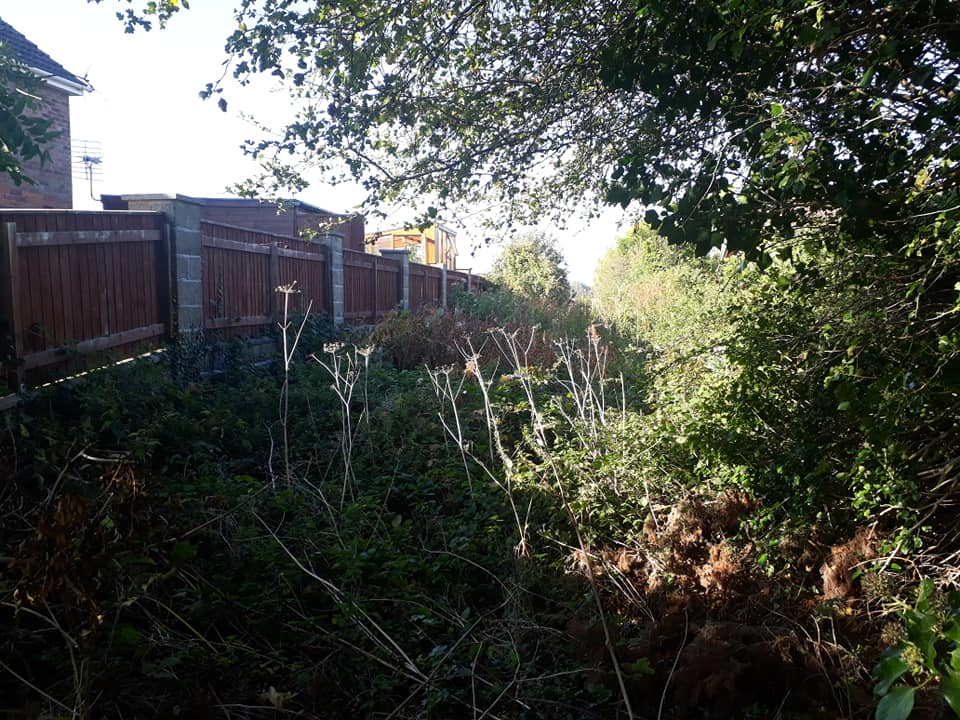
Former platform and overgrown trackbed near Willoughby. Looking towards Alford Town

Two important passenger services called at Willoughby – the Cleethorpes to Kings Cross buffet expresses which called at 7:52 am and 9:50 am, with the return service passing through at 7:05 pm and 9:35 pm. On Summer Saturdays the branch service to Mablethorpe started from the main line platform instead of the bay owing to the large amount of parcels and luggage associated with holiday traffic. Willoughby station was well-kept and regularly received British Rail's "Best Kept Station" awards. In 1969 towards the end of its life, the station won the "second class" award in the annual competition which prompted the local press to recite the saying "we, who are about to die, salute you." The withdrawal of goods facilities at Willoughby was on 2 May 1966 and final closure to passengers on 5 October 1970.

| Preceding station | Disused railways | Following station |
|---|---|---|
| Alford Town; Line and station closed | Great Northern Railway; East Lincolnshire Line | Burgh-le-Marsh; Line and station closed |
| Mumby Road; Line and station closed | Great Northern Railway; Mablethorpe loop railway | Terminus |

== Present day ==
The stationmaster's house from the original Willoughby station has survived, as have the brick goods shed and loading dock which are in industrial use. Very little remains of the second Willoughby station and the aid of a map is necessary to find it. The remains of the down main platform are visible from what is now a ploughed field; on the platform may be seen two concrete posts which supported the station running in board. It is still possible to access the trackbed between the platforms and one gate from the level crossing survives on the south side of the line next to the stationmaster's house which is a private residence. The footbridge was dismantled and now spans a fishing pond at nearby Burgh Le Marsh. Approximately one mile of the former Mablethorpe branch line from the station site at Willoughby has been converted into a nature reserve and footpath.

== Sources ==
- Butt, R. V. J. (October 1995). The Directory of Railway Stations: details every public and private passenger station, halt, platform and stopping place, past and present (1st ed.). Sparkford: Patrick Stephens Ltd. ISBN 978-1-85260-508-7. OCLC 60251199. OL 11956311M.
- Clinker, C. R. (October 1978). Clinker's Register of Closed Passenger Stations and Goods Depots in England, Scotland and Wales 1830–1977. Bristol: Avon-Anglia Publications & Services. ISBN 0-905466-19-5.
- Hill, Roger; Vessey, Carey (1999) [1996]. British Railways Past and Present: Lincolnshire (No. 27). Kettering, Northants: Past & Present Publishing Ltd. ISBN 978-1-85895-083-9.
- Ludlam, A. J. (1991). The East Lincolnshire Railway (OL82). Headington, Oxford: The Oakwood Press. ISBN 0-85361-416-4.
- Ludlam, A. J. (1987). The Louth, Mablethorpe and Willoughby Loop. Headington, Oxford: The Oakwood Press. ISBN 0-85361-354-0. Locomotion Papers No. 162.
- Conolly, W. Philip (2004) [1958]. British Railways Pre-Grouping Atlas and Gazetteer. Hersham, Surrey: Ian Allan Ltd. ISBN 978-0-7110-0320-0.
- Stennett, Alan (2007). Lost Railways of Lincolnshire. Newbury, Berkshire: Countryside Books. ISBN 978-1-84674-040-4.
