= Mumby Road railway station =

Disused railway station in Lincolnshire, England

Mumby Road
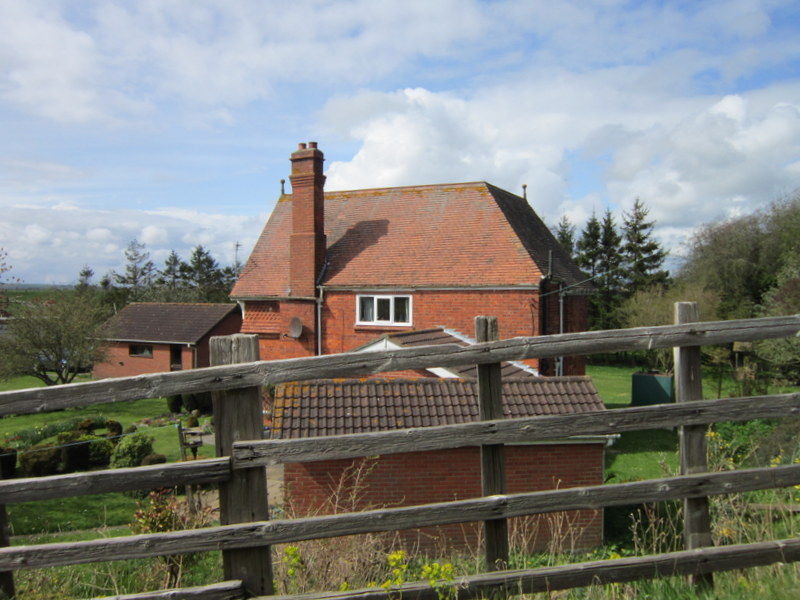
- The site of Mumby Road station

General information
- Location: Bilsby & Mumby, East Lindsey, Lincolnshire; England
- Coordinates: 53.2550°N 0.2421°E
- Platforms: 2

Other information
- Status: Disused

History
- Opened: 4 October 1886; 140 years ago
- Closed: 5 October 1970; 56 years ago
- Original company: Sutton and Willoughby Railway
- Pre-grouping: Great Northern Railway
- Post-grouping: London and North Eastern Railway
Location

Mumby Road railway station was a station on the Great Northern Railway's Mablethorpe Loop line between Willoughby, Mablethorpe and Louth. It served the villages of Thurlby and Bilsby, and was named after the nearby village of Mumby. It opened in 1886 and closed in 1970. The station was immortalised in 1964 in the song "Slow Train" by Flanders and Swann.

Preceding station	Disused railways	Following station
Willoughby; Line and station closed	Great Northern Railway; Mablethorpe Loop	Sutton-on-Sea; Line and station closed
