= Saltfleetby railway station =

Former railway station in Lincolnshire, England

Saltfleetby

General information
- Location: Saltfleetby, Lincolnshire; England
- Coordinates: 53.3899°N 0.1704°E

Other information
- Status: Disused

History
- Opened: 17 October 1877; 148 years ago
- Closed: 5 December 1960; 65 years ago
- Original company: Louth and East Coast Railway
- Pre-grouping: Great Northern Railway
- Post-grouping: LNER
Location

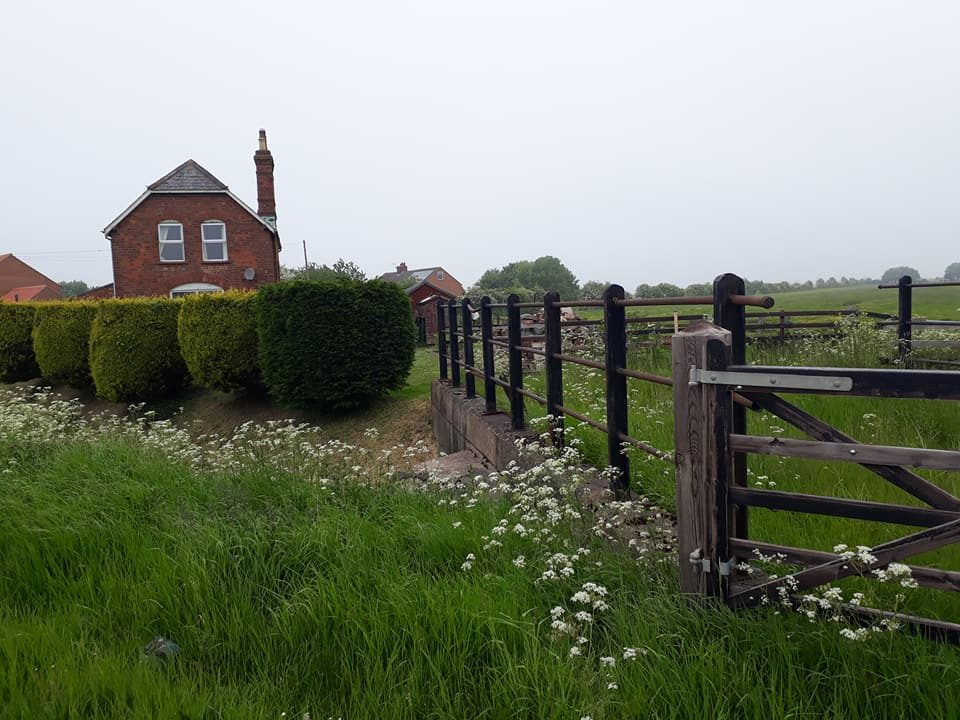
Former cross keepers cottage, the station building is in the distance.

Saltfleetby railway station was a station in Saltfleetby, Lincolnshire on the line between Louth and Mablethorpe which was closed in 1960.

The station was opened on 17 October 1877 when the Louth and East Coast Railway opened the line between Louth and Mablethorpe. This line was connected to the Sutton and Willoughby Railway in 1888 to form the Mablethorpe loop.

The station closed on 5 December 1960 when the line between Louth and Mablethorpe was closed.

Preceding station	Disused railways	Following station
Theddlethorpe; Line and station closed	Great Northern Railway; Mablethorpe loop railway	Grimoldby; Line and station closed

== Bibliography ==
- Grant, Donald J. (2017). Directory of the Railway Companies of Great Britain (1st ed.). Kibworth Beauchamp, Leicestershire: Troubador Publishing Ltd. ISBN 978-1-78803-768-6.
- Hurst, Geoffrey (1992). Register of Closed Railways: 1948-1991. Worksop, Nottinghamshire: Milepost Publications. ISBN 0-9477-9618-5.
- McRae, Andrew (1997). British Railway Camping Coach Holidays: The 1930s & British Railways (London Midland Region). Vol. Scenes from the Past: 30 (Part One). Foxline. ISBN 1-870119-48-7.
- Quick, Michael (2022) [2001]. Railway passenger stations in Great Britain: a chronology (PDF). version 5.04. Railway & Canal Historical Society. Archived from the original (PDF) on 25 November 2022.
