= 1959 Society of Film and Television Arts Television Awards =

UK television awards ceremony

Society of Film and Television Arts Television Awards
- Date: 1959

Highlights
- Best Actor: Donald Pleasence
- Best Actress: Gwen Watford

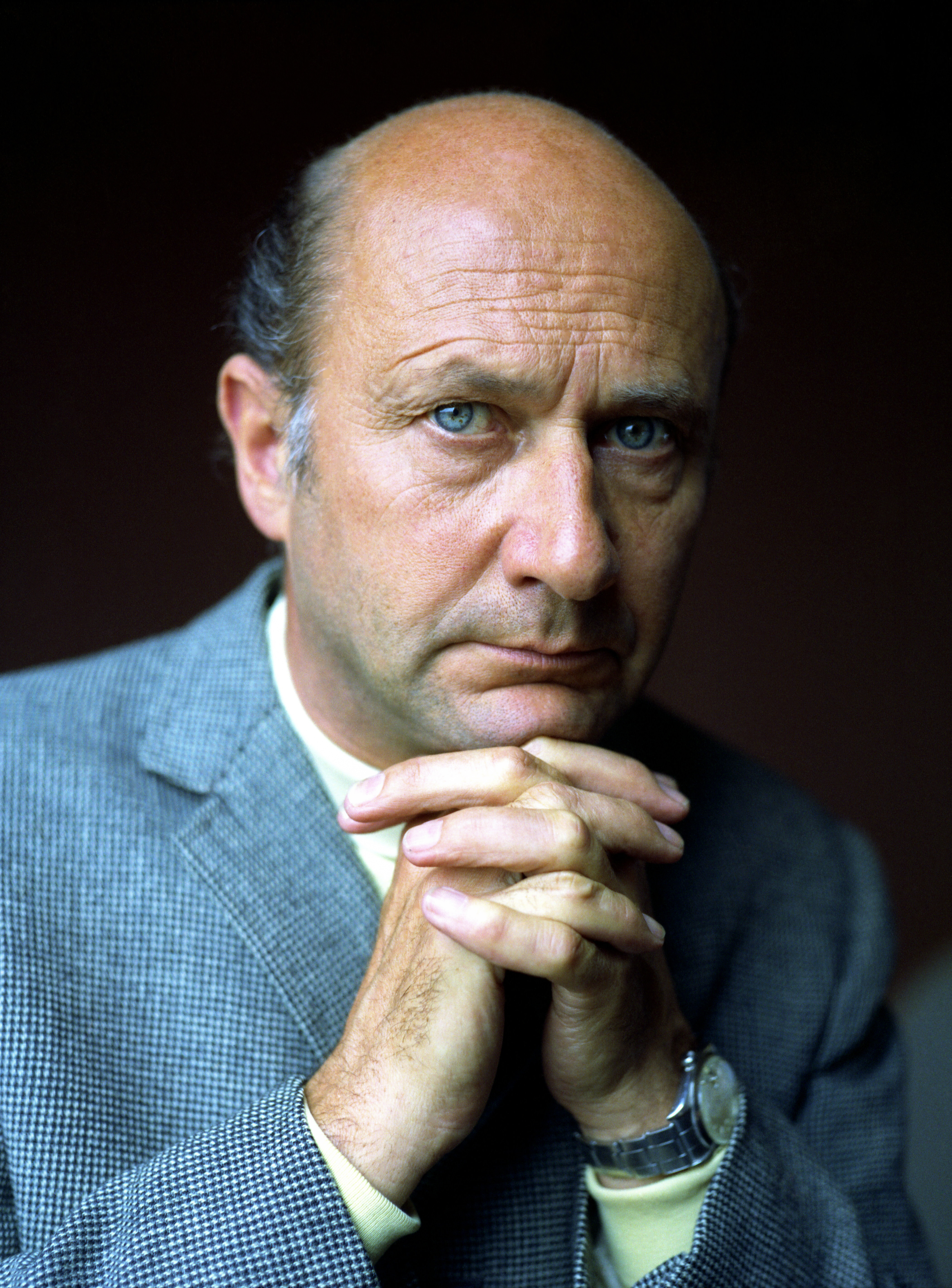
Donald Pleasence

The 1959 Society of Film and Television Arts Television Awards were the first giving under that name of the United Kingdom's premier television awards, having previously been known as the Guild of Television Producers and Directors Awards before that organisation's merger with the British Film Academy. The awards later became known as the British Academy Television Awards, under which name they are still given.

== Winners ==
- Actor
  - Donald Pleasence
- Actress
  - Gwen Watford
- Designer
  - Stephen Bundy
- Drama Production
  - Silvio Narizzano
- Factual
  - The production team of Tonight (BBC)
- Additional
  - The production team of Monitor (BBC)
- Light Entertainment (Production)
  - Joan Kemp-Welch
- Light Entertainment (Artist)
  - Alan Melville
- Personality
  - Cliff Michelmore
- Scriptwriter
  - Colin Morris
- Special Award
  - The production team of Monitor (TV series)
- Writers Award
  - Colin Morris and Ken Hughes
