= Mumby =

Village in the East Lindsey district of Lincolnshire, England

Coordinates: 53.243660°N 0.27018°E

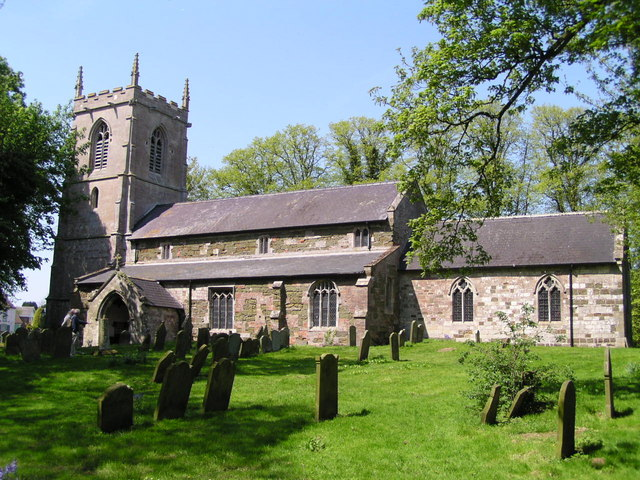
- Church of St Thomas of Canterbury, Mumby

- Location within Lincolnshire
- Population: 447 (2011)
- OS grid reference: TF515742
  - London: 120 mi (190 km) S
- District: East Lindsey
- Shire county: Lincolnshire
- Region: East Midlands
- Country: England
- Sovereign state: United Kingdom
- Post town: Alford
- Postcode district: LN13
- Police: Lincolnshire
- Fire: Lincolnshire
- Ambulance: East Midlands
- UK Parliament: Boston and Skegness

Mumby is a village in the East Lindsey district of Lincolnshire, England. It is located 4 miles (6 km) south-east from the town of Alford. In 2001 the population was recorded as 352, increasing to 447 at the 2011 Census.

The village is mentioned in the Domesday Book of 1086 as consisting of 97 households.

The church is dedicated to St Thomas of Canterbury and is of Early English style. It is a Grade I Listed Building. The font is 14th century, and the western tower is 15th. It was repaired in 1844, with its chancel being rebuilt in 1874. Further restorations were carried out between 1903 and 1908.

The dedication to St Thomas has been disputed; J. Charles Cox refers to a dedication to St Peter. It was originally called St Thomas of Canterbury, but it would appear it was briefly changed to St Peter, but has reverted to its original name.

In the churchyard is the lower part of a 14th-century Grade II listed and scheduled churchyard cross.

From 1888 until 1970 Mumby Road railway station, mentioned in Flanders and Swann's song Slow Train (1963), operated to the west of the village.

Year	Population
1801	461
1811	494
1821	582
1831	619
1841	786
1851	839
1881	639
1891	576
1901	270
1911	285
1921	255
1931	565
1941	N/A (World War II)
1951	281
1961	206
2001	352
2011	447
