= Theddlethorpe =

Theddlethorpe refers to two villages and civil parishes in East Lindsey, Lincolnshire, England:

- Theddlethorpe St Helen
- Theddlethorpe All Saints

Theddlethorpe may also refer to:

- Theddlethorpe railway station
- Theddlethorpe Gas Terminal
