= Burgh-le-Marsh railway station =

Former railway station in Lincolnshire, England

Coordinates: 53.17594°N 0.20842°E

Burgh-le-Marsh
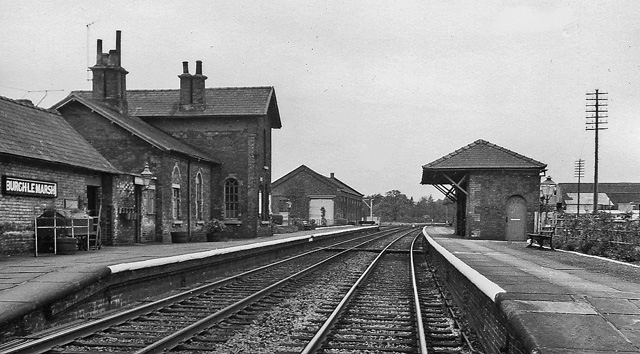
- Station in 1967.

General information
- Location: Burgh le Marsh, East Lindsey; England
- Platforms: 2

Other information
- Status: Disused

History
- Original company: East Lincolnshire Railway
- Pre-grouping: Great Northern Railway
- Post-grouping: London and North Eastern Railway; Eastern Region of British Railways

Key dates
- 3 September 1848: Opened as Burgh
- 9 July 1923: Renamed Burgh-le-Marsh
- 2 May 1966: Closed to goods traffic
- 5 October 1970: Closed to passenger traffic
Location

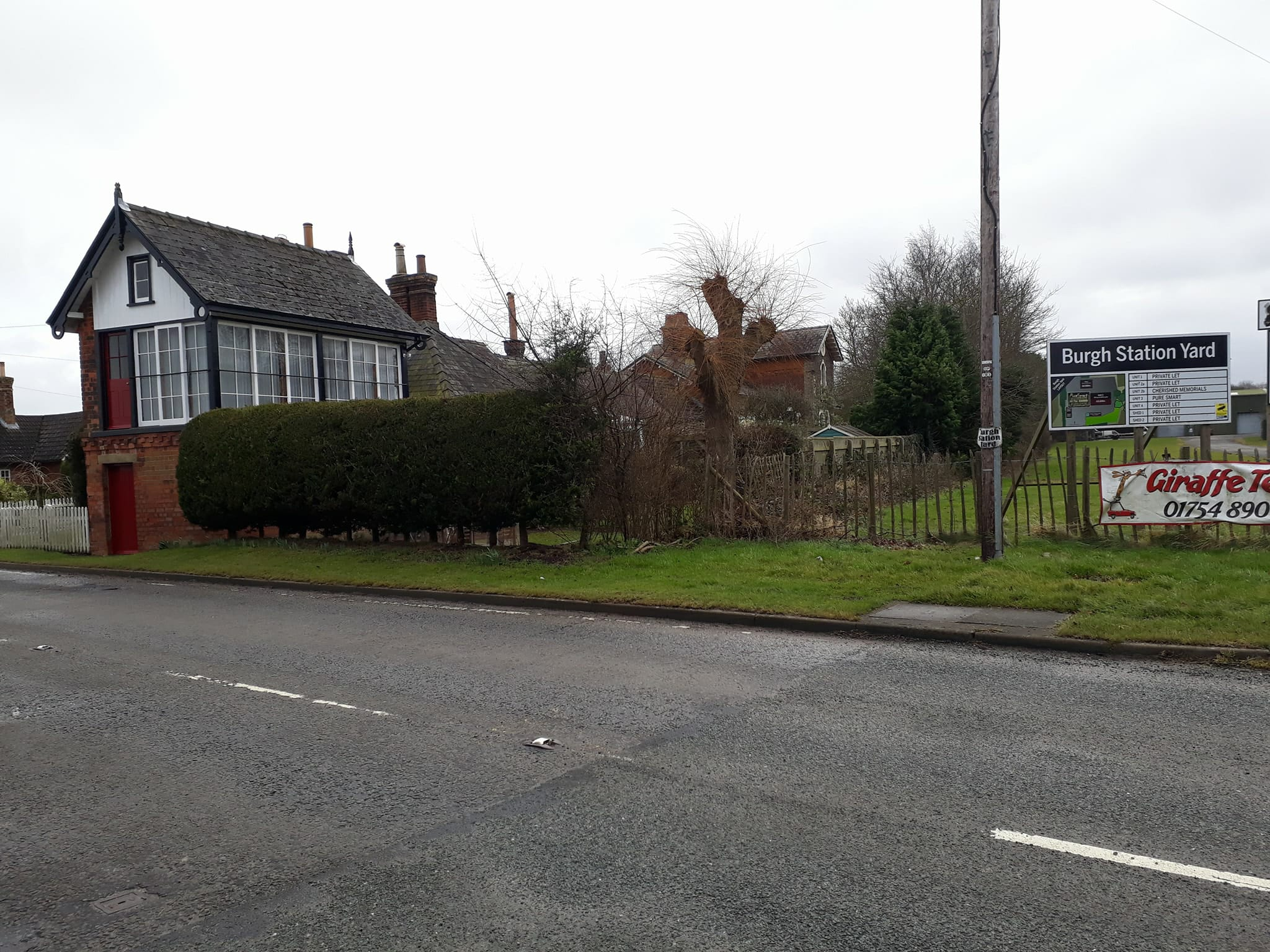
Burgh-le-Marsh station site, signal box and goods yard in 2018 taken from former level crossing

Burgh-le-Marsh was a railway station on the East Lincolnshire Railway which served the town of Burgh le Marsh in Lincolnshire between 1848 and 1970. It originally opened as Burgh, but was renamed in 1923. Withdrawal of goods facilities took place in 1966, followed by passenger services in 1970. The line through the station is now closed.

== History ==
The station was opened on 3 September 1848 as Burgh after the settlement of Burgh le Marsh, and renamed following the railway grouping in 1923 to Burgh-le-Marsh to distinguish it from Burgh-by-Sands on the Carlisle and Silloth Bay Railway. It was constructed by Peto and Betts civil engineering contractors who, in January 1848, had taken over the contract to construct the section of the East Lincolnshire Railway between Louth and Boston from John Waring and Sons. This section was the last to be completed in September 1848 at an agreed cost of £123,000 (equivalent to £15,600,000 in 2023). The station was provided with parallel platforms, with the main buildings, goods shed, cattle dock and signal box on the up (east) side. Immediately to the north of the station was a level crossing over the main road leading to Burgh, two miles to the south-east. A long refuge siding at the station was capable of holding 80 wagons. The July 1922 timetable saw six up and five down weekday services, plus one Sunday service each way, call at Burgh. The station was closed to goods traffic on 2 May 1966 and to passengers on 5 October 1970.

Preceding station	Disused railways	Following station
Willoughby; Line and station closed	Great Northern Railway; East Lincolnshire Line	Firsby; Line and station closed

== Present day ==
The station buildings and signal box have survived virtually intact in private ownership. The goods shed is also still standing and once housed a railway museum, now closed and whose contents have been dispersed. A section of the trackbed to the south between Burgh and Bratoft is owned by the National Trust and is open as a footpath. The trackbed to the north has been severed just beyond the station by the bypass around the village.

== Sources ==
- Butt, R. V. J. (October 1995). The Directory of Railway Stations: details every public and private passenger station, halt, platform and stopping place, past and present (1st ed.). Sparkford: Patrick Stephens Ltd. ISBN 978-1-85260-508-7. OCLC 60251199. OL 11956311M.
- Clinker, C.R. (October 1978). Clinker's Register of Closed Passenger Stations and Goods Depots in England, Scotland and Wales 1830-1977. Bristol: Avon-Anglia Publications & Services. ISBN 0-905466-19-5.
- Hill, Roger; Vessey, Carey (1999) [1996]. British Railways Past and Present: Lincolnshire (No. 27). Kettering, Northants: Past & Present Publishing Ltd. ISBN 978-1-85895-083-9.
- Ludlam, A.J. (1991). The East Lincolnshire Railway (Locomotive Papers No. 82). Headington, Oxford: The Oakwood Press. ISBN 0-85361-416-4.
- Conolly, W. Philip (2004) [1958]. British Railways Pre-Grouping Atlas and Gazetteer. Hersham, Surrey: Ian Allan Ltd. ISBN 978-0-7110-0320-0.
- Stennett, Alan (2007). Lost Railways of Lincolnshire. Newbury, Berkshire: Countryside Books. ISBN 978-1-84674-040-4.
