= Theddlethorpe railway station =

Former railway station in England

Theddlethorpe
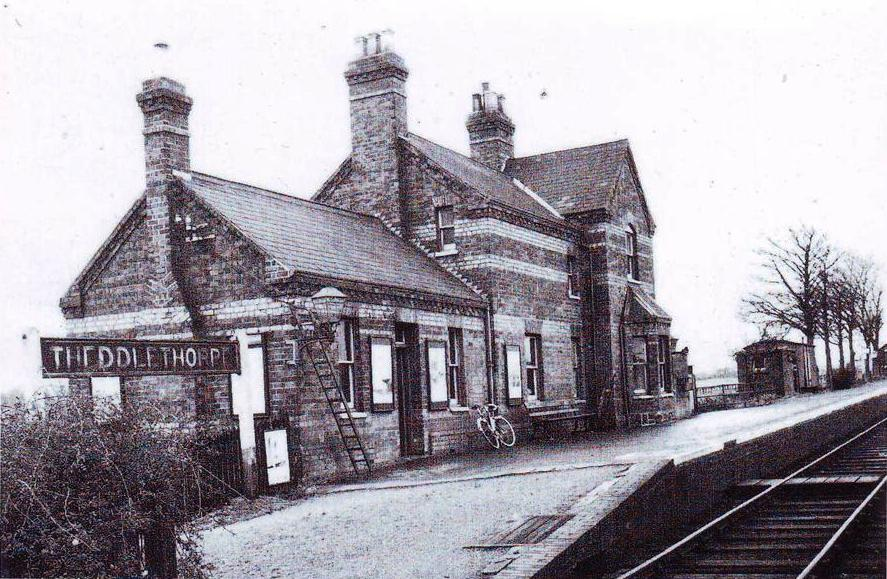
- Theddlethorpe Railway Station

General information
- Location: Theddlethorpe, Lincolnshire; England
- Coordinates: 53.3709°N 0.2047°E

Other information
- Status: Disused

History
- Opened: 17 October 1877; 148 years ago
- Closed: 5 December 1960; 65 years ago
- Original company: Louth and East Coast Railway
- Pre-grouping: Great Northern Railway
- Post-grouping: LNER
Location

Theddlethorpe railway station was a station serving Theddlethorpe, Lincolnshire from 1877 to 1960.

The station was opened on 17 October 1877 when the Louth and East Coast Railway opened the line between Louth and Mablethorpe. This line was connected to the Sutton and Willoughby Railway in 1888 to form the Mablethorpe loop.

The station was host to a LNER camping coach from 1935 to 1939 and possibly one for some of 1934.

The station closed on 5 December 1960 when the line between Louth and Mablethorpe was closed.

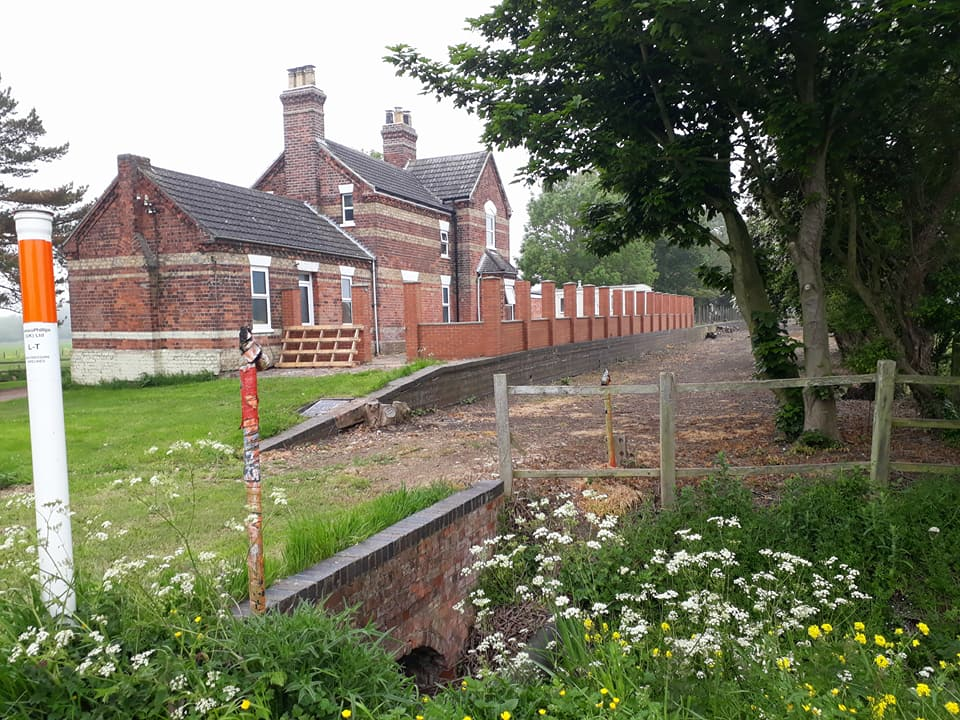
The former station building and platform in 2018

Preceding station	Disused railways	Following station
Mablethorpe	Great Northern Railway; Mablethorpe loop railway	Saltfleetby

== Bibliography ==
- Grant, Donald J. (2017). Directory of the Railway Companies of Great Britain (1st ed.). Kibworth Beauchamp, Leicestershire: Troubador Publishing Ltd. ISBN 978-1-78803-768-6.
- Hurst, Geoffrey (1992). Register of Closed Railways: 1948-1991. Worksop, Nottinghamshire: Milepost Publications. ISBN 0-9477-9618-5.
- McRae, Andrew (1997). British Railway Camping Coach Holidays: The 1930s & British Railways (London Midland Region). Vol. Scenes from the Past: 30 (Part One). Foxline. ISBN 1-870119-48-7.
- Quick, Michael (2022) [2001]. Railway passenger stations in Great Britain: a chronology (PDF). version 5.04. Railway & Canal Historical Society. Archived from the original (PDF) on 25 November 2022.
