= Mablethorpe loop railway =

Railway in Lincolnshire, England

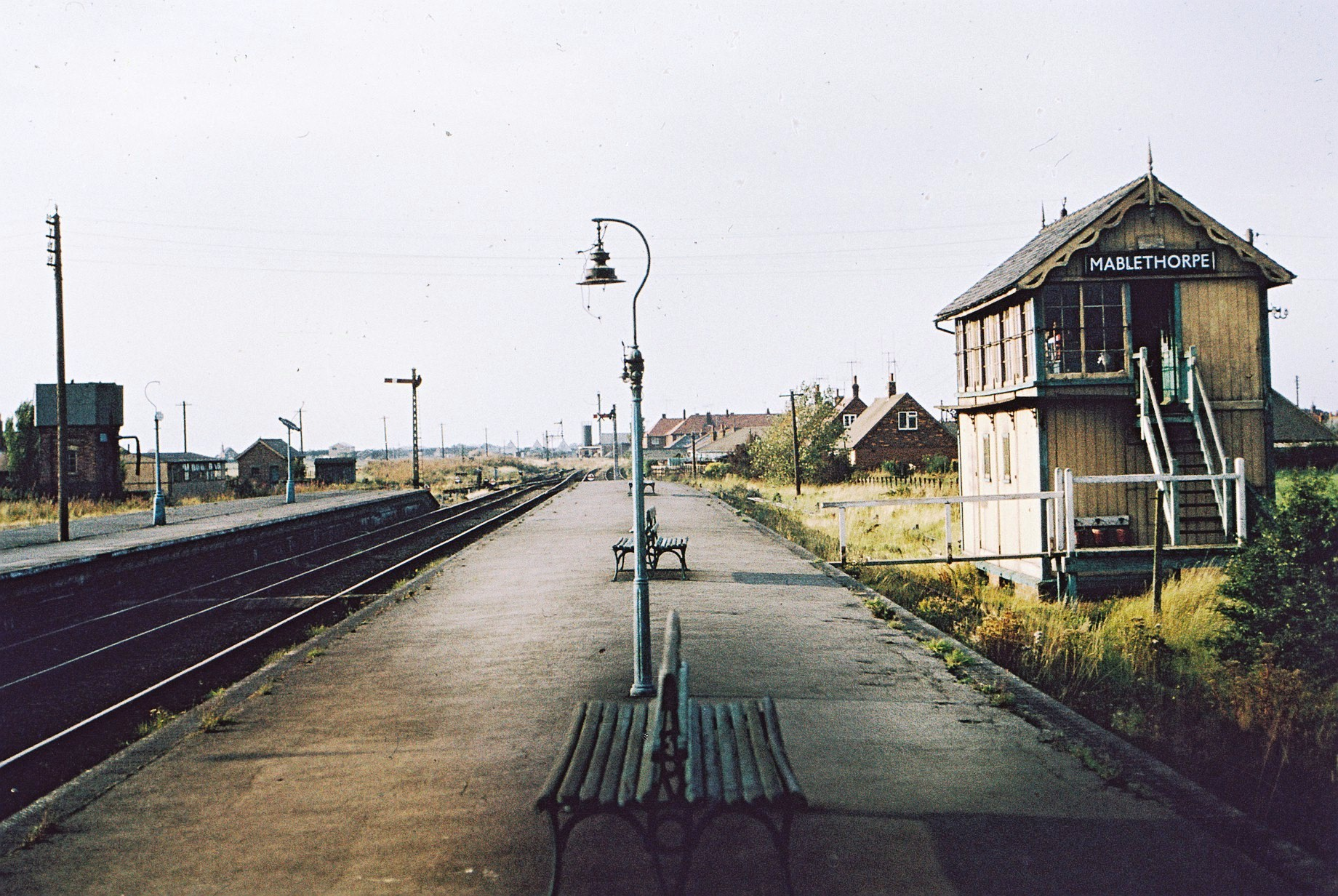
Mablethorpe railway station in the 1960s

The Mablethorpe Loop railway was formed in Lincolnshire, England, by two independent railway companies, which built branches from the East Lincolnshire Line.

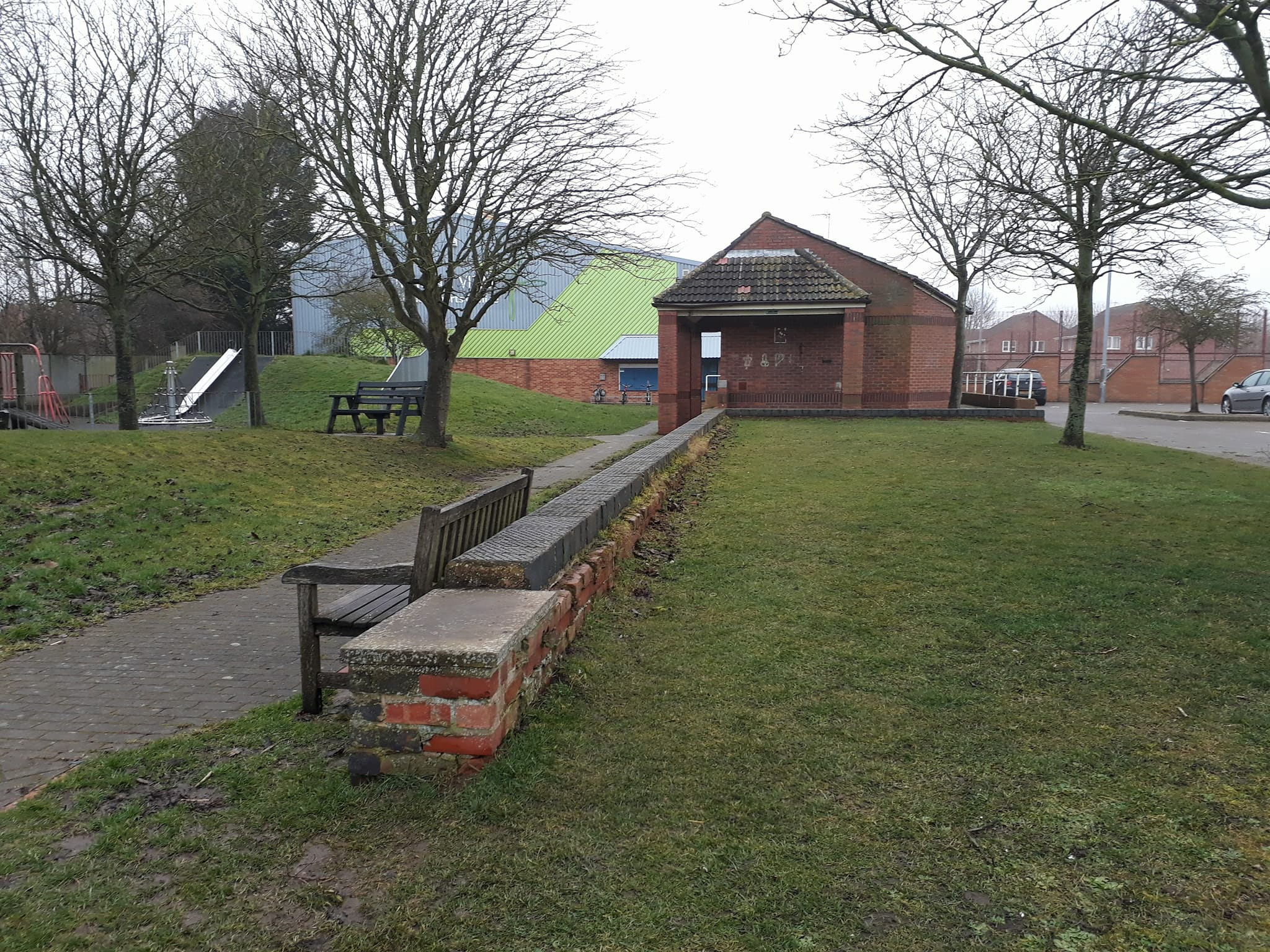
Site of Mablethorpe Station in 2018. Only a short section of platform remains as seen in the middle.

The Louth and East Coast Railway opened its line, approaching Mablethorpe from the North, in 1877. This was followed by the opening of the Sutton and Willoughby Railway and Dock company in 1886; it had planned to create a large fishing dock at Sutton le Marsh, but it was unable to generate the capital to do so. Abandoning the dock idea, instead it built a connecting line to Mablethorpe, approaching from the south, and opening in 1888. Together the lines formed a loop off the main line. The two small companies sold their concerns to the Great Northern Railway in 1902 (S&WR) and 1908 (L&ECR).

Mablethorpe developed very considerably as a holiday and excursion destination, facilitated by the railway connection, and the GNR did much to foster the business, running through excursions from Midlands towns, and later London, as well as handling holiday visitors. The local traffic was never significant, and the L&ECR section closed in 1960; as seaside holidays in Britain lost popularity, the remaining line declined and was closed in 1970.

== Origins ==
In 1848 the Great Northern Railway had opened its East Lincolnshire Line, having leased the unbuilt line from the East Lincolnshire Railway Company in 1846. The new line connected Boston and Grimsby, running in a largely straight line, through the market centre of Louth.

This left a considerable number of important small towns unconnected to the railway network, and a number of independent companies were created to make branch lines. In the later decades of the nineteenth century, seaside watering places were beginning to rise in importance; a branch line to Skegness had been authorised in 1869 and Mablethorpe aspired to have its own connection.

== Louth and East Coast Railway ==
Louth and East Coast Railway Act 1872
- Act of Parliament
- Parliament of the United Kingdom
- Long title: An Act to authorise the Construction of the Louth and East Coast Railway.
- Citation: 35 & 36 Vict. c. cx

Dates
- Royal assent: 18 July 1872

Louth and East Coast Railway Act 1877
- Act of Parliament
- Parliament of the United Kingdom
- Long title: An Act to confer further powers upon the Louth and East Coast Railway Company; and for other purposes.
- Citation: 40 & 41 Vict. c. x

Dates
- Royal assent: 17 May 1877

Text of statute as originally enacted

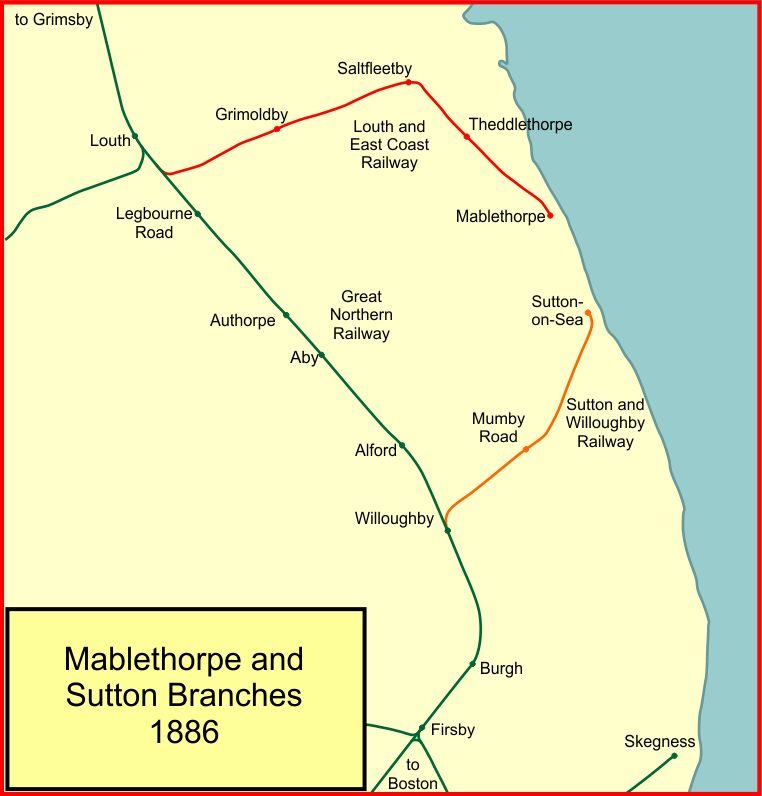
Mablethorpe lines in 1886

The Louth and East Coast Railway was incorporated on 18 July 1872 by the Louth and East Coast Railway Act 1872 (35 & 36 Vict. c. cx) to make a line from Louth to Mablethorpe, a branch from Saltfleetby to North Somercotes, and a spur from this branch to Saltfleetby Haven. Authorised share capital was £96,000. The company had arranged with the Great Northern Railway to work the line for 50% of receipts for 21 years. However nothing was done towards actual construction, and on 17 May 1877 the Louth and East Coast Railway obtained a second act of Parliament, the Louth and East Coast Railway Act 1877 (40 & 41 Vict. c. x), allowing an extension of time for construction, and deviation of the branches. (In fact the branches were never made.)

== Opening ==
Construction proceeded, and public traffic began on 17 October 1877, after a ceremonial opening the previous day. The line was 11 miles 68 chains long, generally straight and level. It diverged from the main line at Mablethorpe junction, 1 mile 8 chains south of Louth; the junction was aligned for direct running from Louth to Mablethorpe. There were 12 level crossings over public roads and six wooden underbridges. Stations and sidings were provided at Grimoldby, Saltfleetby, Theddlethorpe and Mablethorpe. At the suggestion of the GNR, Mablethorpe station was laid out to handle a large excursion traffic, although only one line was in use at first. The contractor, Henry Jackson, went bankrupt owing the GNR £800 for haulage.

== Sutton and Willoughby Railway ==
Sutton and Willoughby Railway Act 1884
- Act of Parliament
- Parliament of the United Kingdom
- Long title: An Act for authorising the Construction of Railways in the county of Lincoln to be called the Sutton and Willoughby Railway and for other purposes.
- Citation: 47 & 48 Vict. c. clxx

Dates
- Royal assent: 28 July 1884

Text of statute as originally enacted

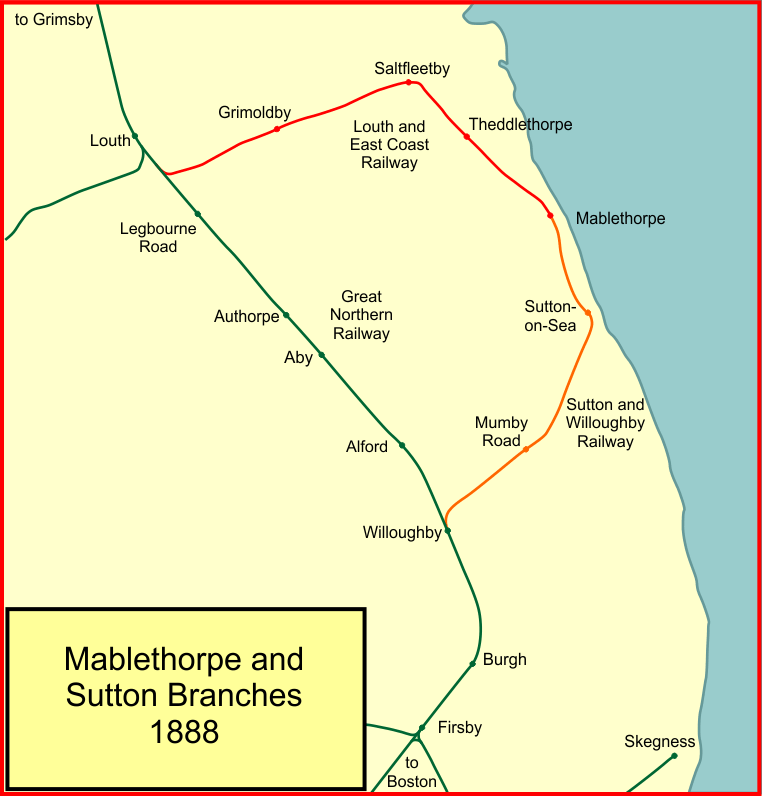
Mablethorpe lines in 1888

In the early 1880s there were plans for a great fishing port to rival Grimsby. It was to be situated near the village of Sutton le Marsh two miles south of Mablethorpe. The location was considered to offer an excellent location for a new harbour. The Sutton and Willoughby Railway and Dock Company (S&WR) was projected to connect it to the East Lincolnshire main line, and on 28 July 1884 it was authorised by the Sutton and Willoughby Railway Act 1884 (47 & 48 Vict. c. clxx). It was to construct a line from Willoughby (on the East Lincolnshire main line) to Sutton le Marsh and build docks there; authorised share capital was £60,000. The traditional name of Sutton had been Sutton-le-Marsh; the S&WR used a new name, Sutton-on-Sea, which was much more encouraging.

At first the GNR refused to work the line until the Sutton docks were built, fearing that there would be little income from the bare agricultural district alone, but on 9 August 1886 it agreed to work it for 50% of the receipts for 21 years. The GNR also agreed to renew the working arrangement with the L&ECR on the existing terms for 21 years from the date the S&WR opened. The dock was never made; the S&WR was unable to raise enough money to consider its construction. In December 1886 a fresh concern, the North Sea Fisheries Harbour and Dock Company promoted it again, but the GNR would not help, and this scheme too foundered.

The line between Willoughby Junction and Sutton was given a formal opening formal opening on 23 September 1886, but general traffic did not start until 4 October 1886.

The single line from the junction at Willoughby to Sutton was 7 miles 13 chains in extent. There was one intermediate station at Mumby Road; there were five trains each way on weekdays only. The GNR built a new station at Willoughby nearer the junction: it was provided with three platform faces, the up platform being an island, and new signal boxes were built there and at the junction. The station was completed early in 1887. The Sutton and Willoughby Company was asked to pay £3,966 for its proportion of the new station, the junction and signalbox, and a ticket platform on its line.

== Completing the loop ==
Sutton and Willoughby Railway (Mablethorpe Extension) Act 1886
- Act of Parliament
- Parliament of the United Kingdom
- Long title: An Act to enable the Sutton and Willoughby Railway Company to extend their Railway to Mablethorpe in the Parts of Lindsey in the County of Lincoln and to confer upon them further powers in relation to their Undertaking; and for other purposes.
- Citation: 50 Vict. c. xlviii

Dates
- Royal assent: 25 September 1886

Text of statute as originally enacted

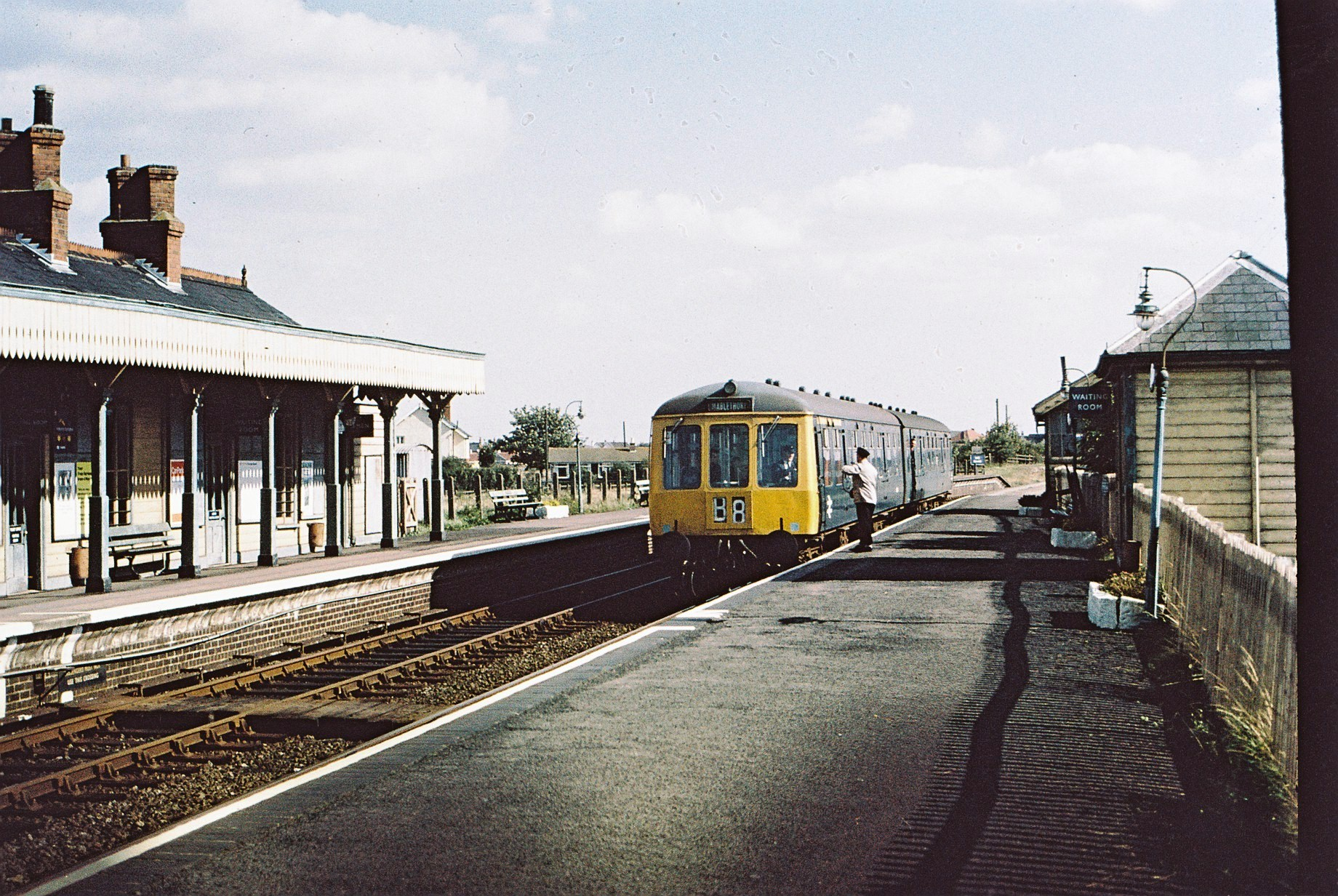
Sutton-on-Sea railway station in the 1960s)

Seeing that the harbour scheme would not proceed, the Sutton and Willoughby Railway decided instead to link its line with Mablethorpe directly; the gap was modest. The L&ECR company had reservations about admitting the Sutton company into its station, but after some deliberation agreed, and made arrangements to modify the station for through running. The S&WR obtained another act of Parliament, the Sutton and Willoughby Railway (Mablethorpe Extension) Act 1886' (50 Vict. c. xlviii), on 25 September 1886, authorising an extension of its railway (which was not yet open to the public) to an end-on junction with the Louth and East Coast Railway at Mablethorpe.

The extension formed a loop line of the East Lincolnshire Line, and it was opened on 14 July 1888. It was 2 miles 47 chains in extent. Mablethorpe station was altered for through running. The line crossed the Alford and Sutton Tramway, and special arrangements were made at the intersection. From 22 July, Sunday trains ran from Leicester to Sutton and Mablethorpe via Willoughby.

== Lancashire, Derbyshire and East Coast Railway ==
The Lancashire, Derbyshire and East Coast Railway was authorised in 1891. It was an ambitious scheme to build a line across the country and to take over the Sutton Harbour scheme. Financial problems overtook the project and the Sutton Harbour idea was forgotten.

== Absorbed by Great Northern Railway ==
By the end of the 19th century the Sutton and Willoughby Railway was in serious financial difficulty, and had been discussing with the GNR the possibility of the larger concern buying it out. In January 1900 the GNR offered to absorb it for £40,000. The stumbling block for the GNR was the magnitude of debentures that the S&WR had outstanding, which in any purchase the GNR would have to take on. (The S&WR had been "extravagantly" built.) In December 1901 the GNR arranged an advance of £21,000 from the Union Bank and took over £28,000 of S&WR debentures; it took over the line for £40,500, also letting the S&WR off a £6,495 debt. This was finally arranged in March 1902. There were then about five trains each way on ordinary weekdays, but in the summer excursion trains came from Derby, Nottingham, and Leicester, allowing five hours at the seaside at Sutton and Mablethorpe.

Louth and East Coast Railway (Transfer) Act 1908
- Act of Parliament
- Parliament of the United Kingdom
- Long title: An Act for transferring to and Vesting in the Great Northern Railway Company the undertaking of the Louth and East Coast Railway Company and for other purposes.
- Citation: 8 Edw. 7. c. li

Dates
- Royal assent: 1 August 1908

The L&ECR saw that the S&WR had achieved a successful outcome in being purchased by the GNR, and gave consideration to its own future. In August 1906 the price of £87,000 was agreed. The Louth and East Coast Railway (Transfer) Act 1908 (8 Edw. 7. c. li) was passed on 1 August 1908.

== Goods traffic ==
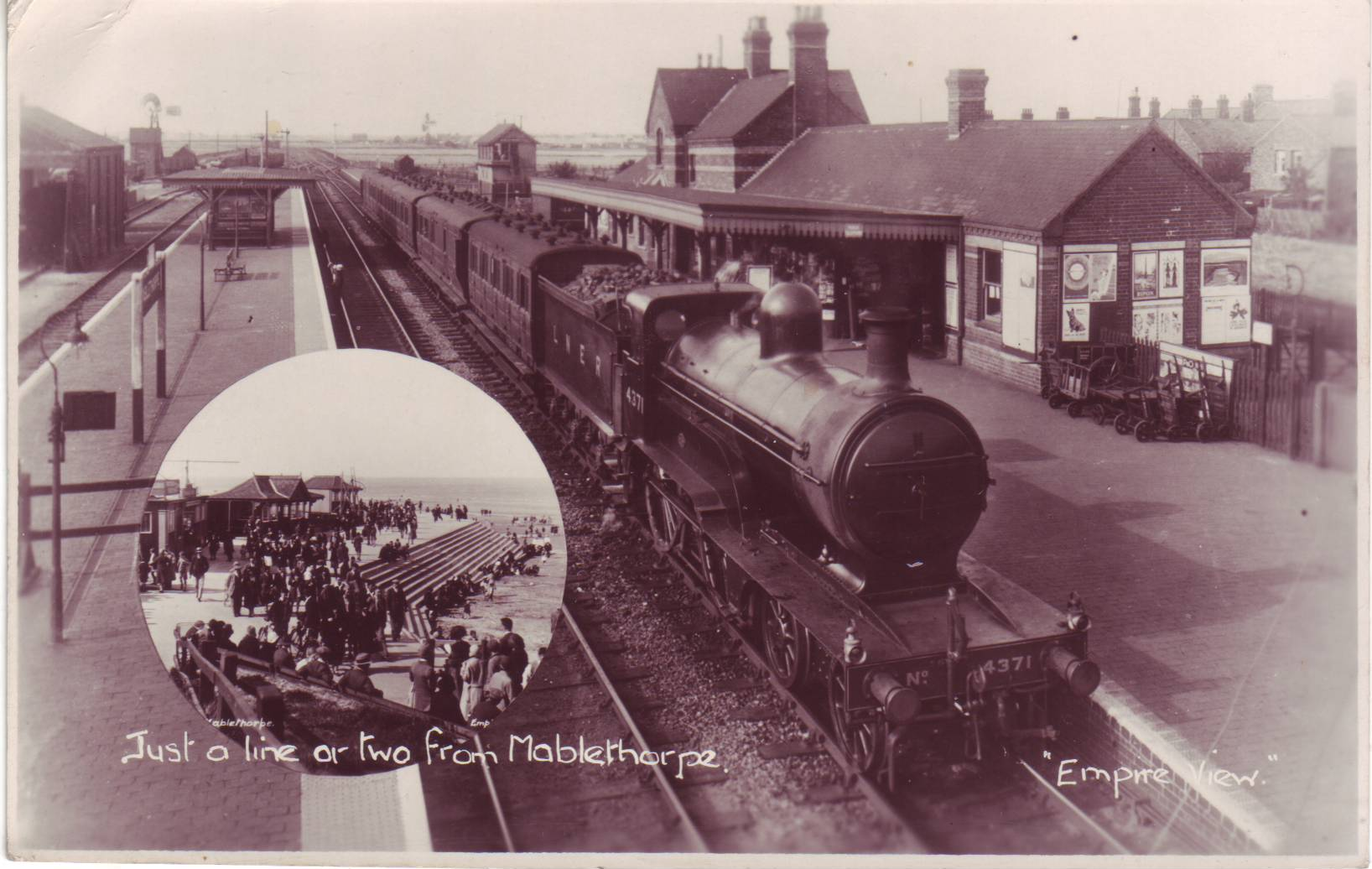
Mablethorpe railway station in the 1920s

The goods traffic of the district was agricultural. The Mablethorpe loop helped local farmers considerably: for example it was far easier and cheaper to send cattle to Louth market On the L&ECR each small station had a cattle pen together with a siding and loading dock. Mablethorpe was planned as the railhead for a wide area, so facilities were more generous and included a brick goods shed together with a long siding for coal merchants.

== Passenger train services ==
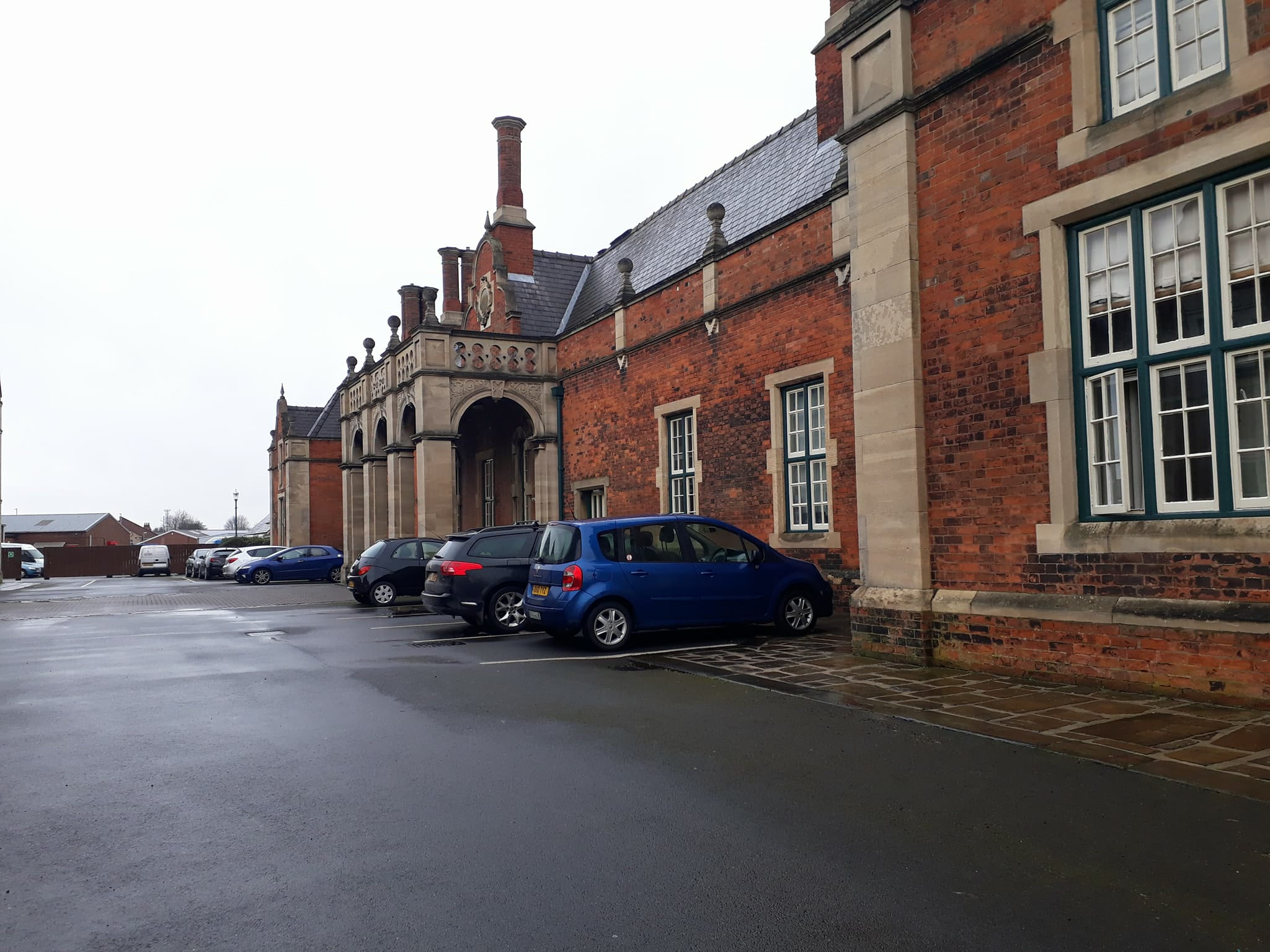
Louth station on the East Lincolnshire Line, was the northern terminus of the Mablethorpe Loop Railway until 1960.

Over the years, loop passenger services were quite varied. Some of the 8 to 10 ordinary trains a day ran from Louth to Willoughby, but there were also Mablethorpe to Willoughby and Sutton to Louth workings. Certain summer trains were extended to Grimsby, Firsby, Grantham and even Nottingham. A steam railmotor was used on the line from 1905.

Squires adds some detail:

The line became increasingly popular with holidaymakers in the first decade of the twentieth century. In 1906 on August Bank Holiday, 5,400 people took advantage of the three shillings return fare from Kings Cross to Mablethorpe, and the total number of excursionists for the summer was 92,000.

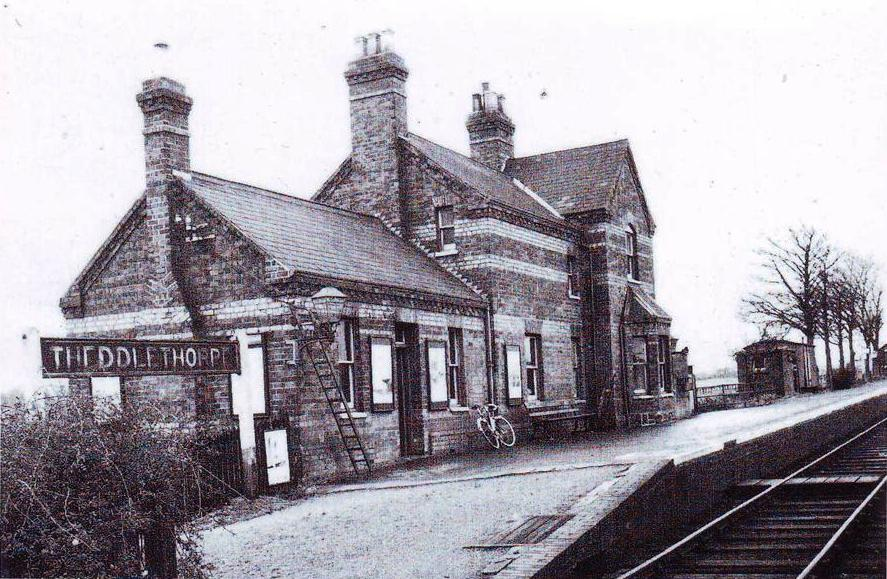
Theddlethorpe railway station

Mablethorpe was always popular with people from the Nottingham area. From the early days there was a weekday through train between the two, via Grantham and Boston. This service operated until the outbreak of war in 1939. By 1914, on peak summer Saturdays, there were four return through-trains between Nottingham and Mablethorpe, and one each from Leicester, Leeds and Bradford, and Manchester via Sheffield. The traffic was not confined to weekends, for weekday specials also ran from Midlands towns in their holiday weeks, but Sunday was the peak day. On the busiest days, storage was a problem, and Mablethorpe's three carriage sidings were fully used. Goods sidings were pressed into use, and finally the line north to Louth, on which no Sunday service ran, was filled up with trains end to end. Many of the engines from these trains were too large for the small turntable, and they were despatched, three at a time, to Firsby, to be turned via the triangle there formed by the Skegness branch junctions. The greatest number of excursion trains in one day was August Bank Holiday Sunday, 1951, when there were nineteen.

== Flooding emergency in 1953 ==
The railway became a lifeline in 1953: on the night of 31 January a surge of water in the North Sea caught the east coast of England unawares and as night fell the dunes south of Sutton on Sea were breached. There was severe flooding, up to five feet deep in places, and several people were drowned. One Mablethorpe family escaped by using a platelayers’ trolley on the line. The whole area was evacuated and a battle began to close the gap through which successive tides continued to flood. The Army and civilian contractors were called in and between them they used 40,000 tons of Scunthorpe slag, brought by rail to Sutton on Sea over a two-week period, to stem the tide. Train loads were delivered to Alford, from where they were delivered, sixteen 12-ton wagon loads at a time.

Brand new diesel multiple units replaced steam traction on Mablethorpe local services in 1956. In 1960 there were diesel services working 8 trips over the full length of the loop. Passenger traffic was booming and there were many extras south of Mablethorpe particularly on Saturdays, and two on Sundays.

== Closures ==
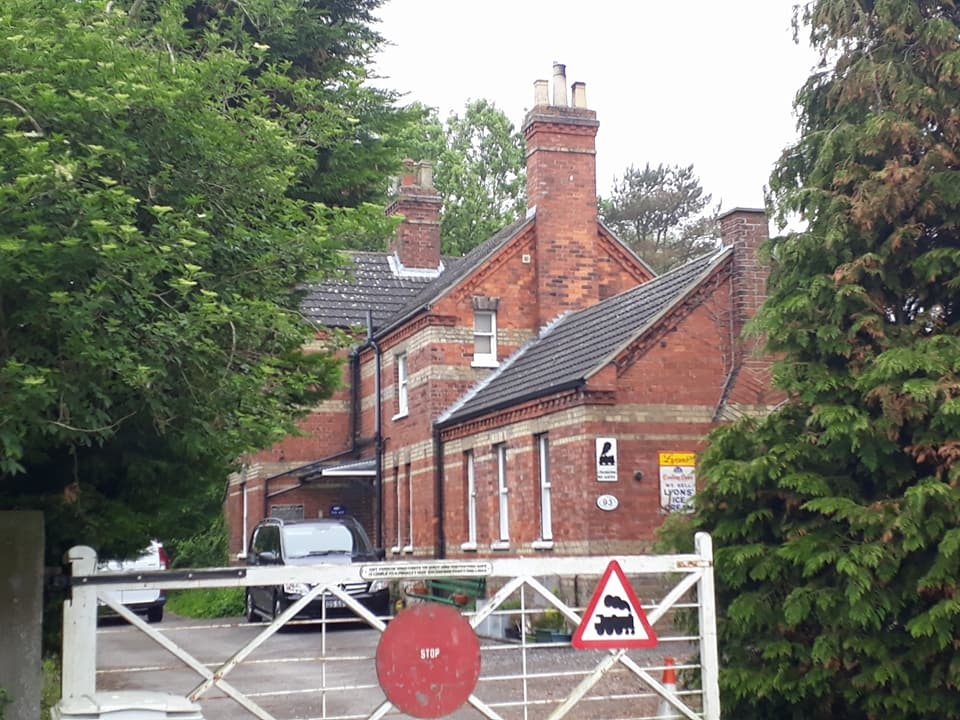
Grimoldby station building

The southward connection to Mablethorpe via Willoughby had always dominated in serving the holiday traffic. The decline in the use of rural railways for ordinary passenger and goods business was heavily felt in the locality and the line between Louth and Mablethorpe closed completely on 5 December 1960. However on one night in the summer of 1961, a late night return excursion to Lincoln had to traverse the route because of a derailment on the level crossing at the south end of Mablethorpe Station, so that the train was unable to run on its ordinary route direct to Willoughby.

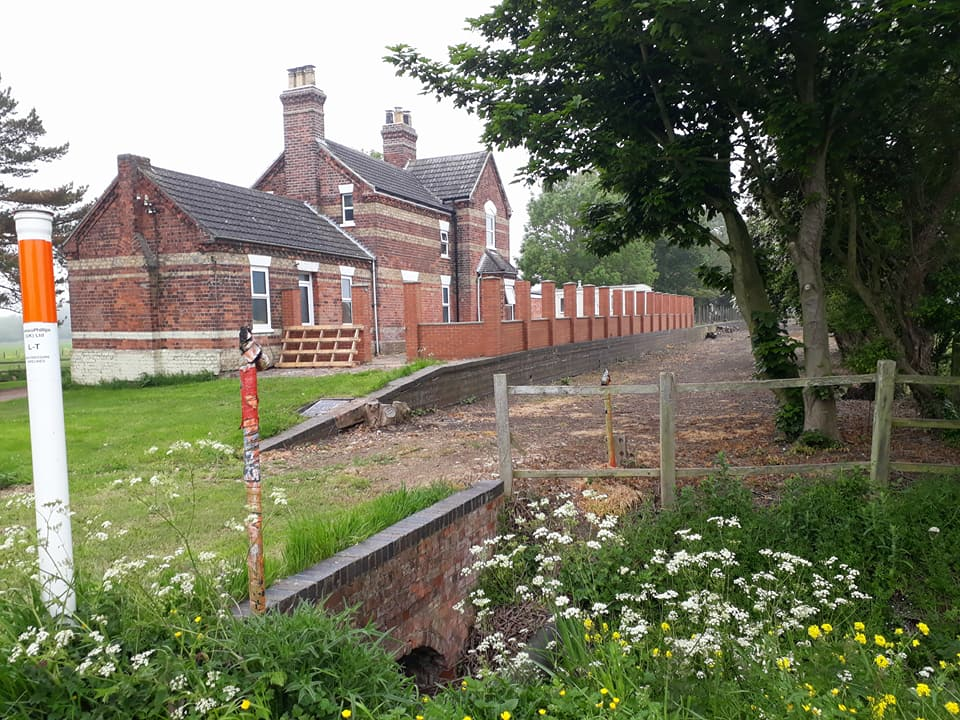
Theddlethorpe station

The Willoughby connection too was under consideration for closure, but it was retained because the summer traffic was buoyant: 402,000 passengers arrived at Mablethorpe by rail in 1962.

The line lost its goods service on 30 June 1964. Pay-trains were introduced in 1968, and the line still enjoyed a good level of service, with eleven up and ten down trains a day. However as part of a rationalisation scheme throughout the district, the branch closed completely on 5 October 1970, together with the East Lincolnshire Line north of Firsby.

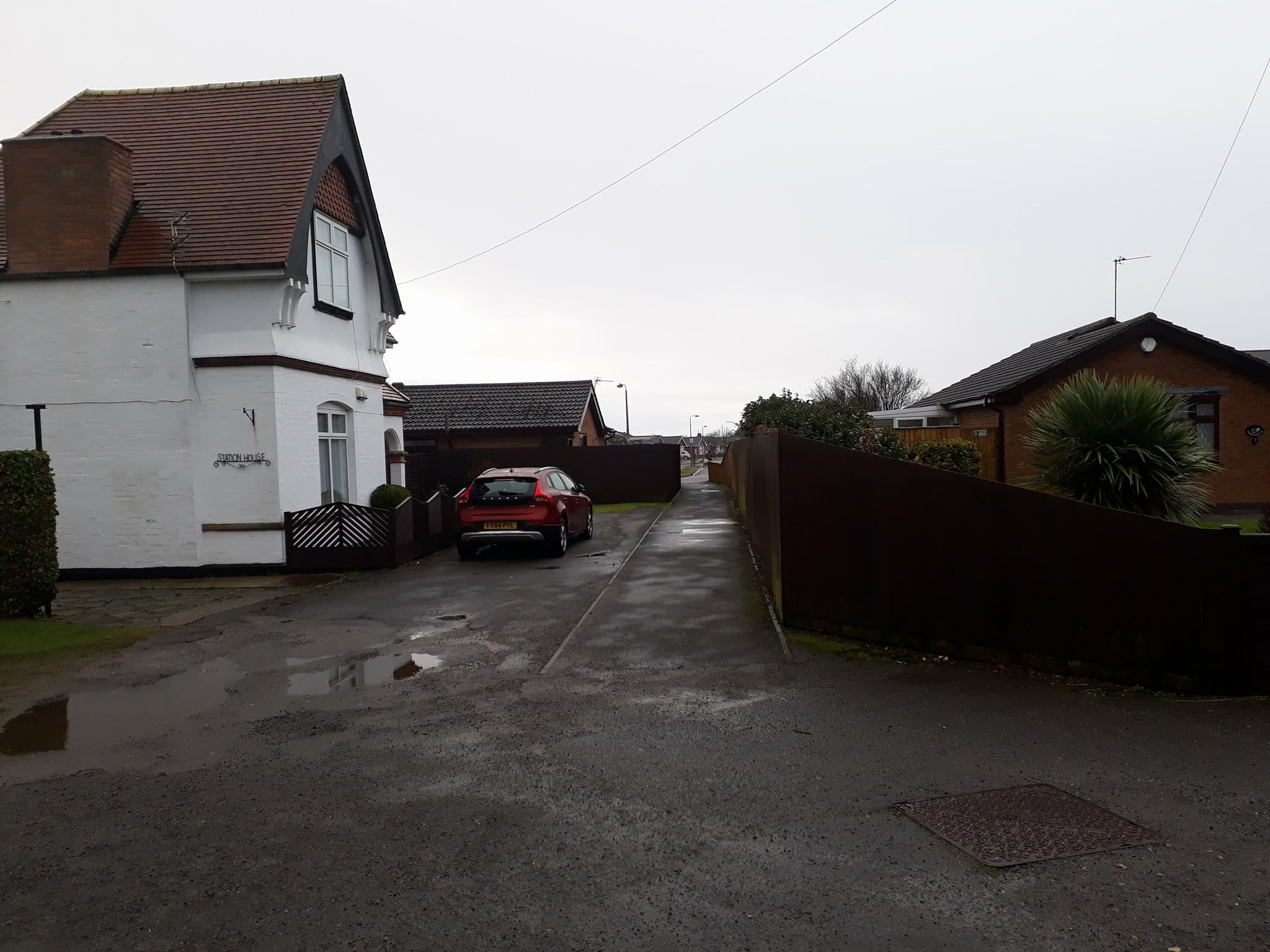
Site of Sutton on Sea station in 2018. Only station masters house remains on left.

== Station list ==
- Louth; main line station;
- Grimoldby; opened 17 October 1877; closed 5 December 1960;
- Saltfleetby; opened 17 October 1877; closed 5 December 1960;
- Theddlethorpe; opened 17 October 1877; closed 5 December 1960;
- Mablethorpe; opened 17 October 1877; closed 5 October 1970;
- Sutton-on-Sea; opened 4 October 1886, closed 5 October 1970;
- Mumby Road; opened 4 October 1886; closed 5 October 1970;
- Willoughby; opened 3 September 1848; relocated 4 October 1886; closed 5 October 1970.

== See also ==
Lincolnshire lines of the Great Northern Railway
