= Sutton-on-Sea railway station =

Former railway station in England

Sutton-on-Sea
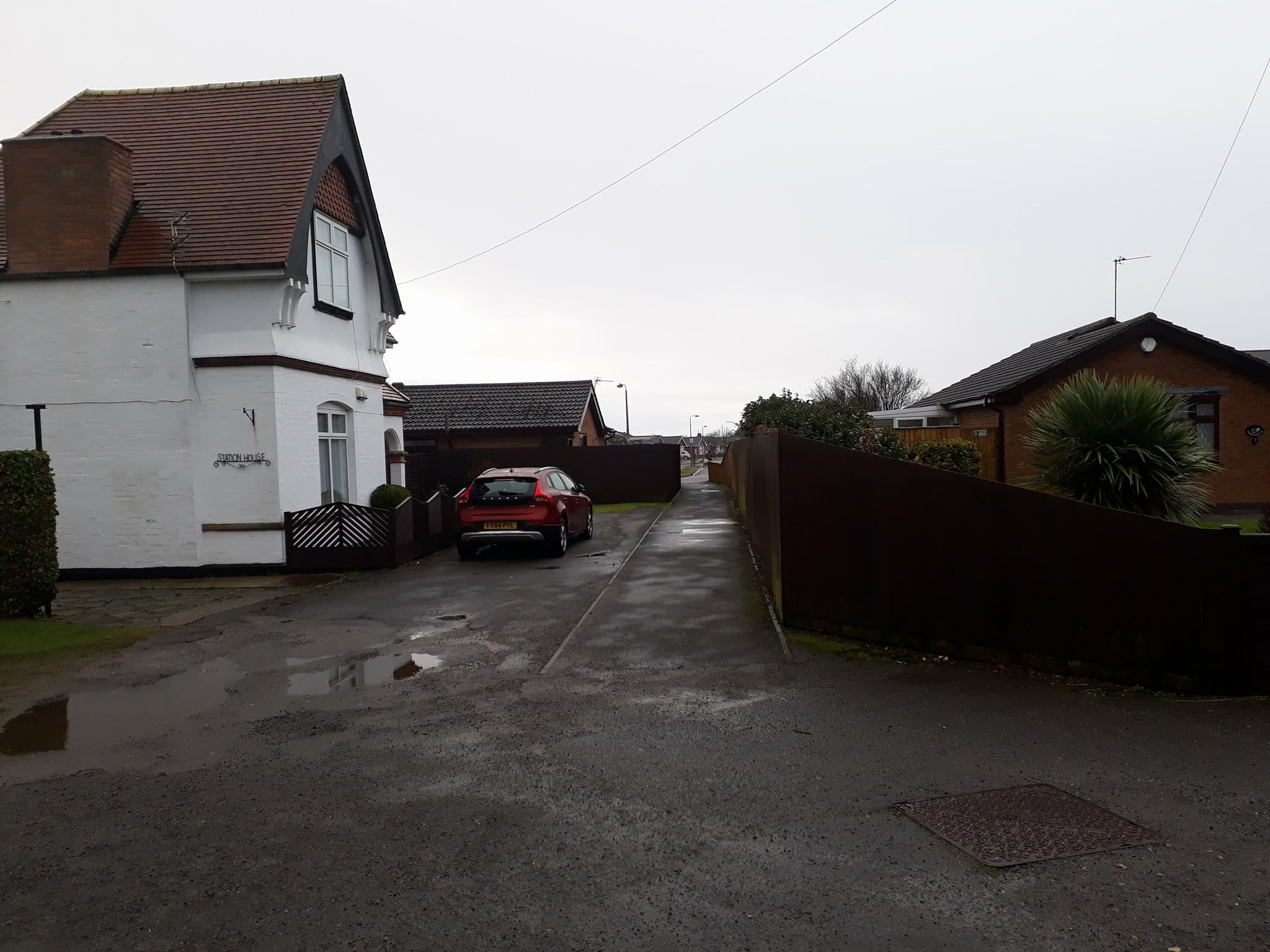
- The former station masters house, now a private residence

General information
- Location: Sutton-on-Sea, East Lindsey; England
- Coordinates: 53.3056°N 0.2801°E
- Platforms: 2

Other information
- Status: Disused

History
- Opened: 4 October 1886; 139 years ago (as Sutton-le-Marsh)
- Closed: 5 October 1970; 55 years ago
- Original company: Sutton and Willoughby Railway
- Pre-grouping: Great Northern Railway
- Post-grouping: London and North Eastern Railway

Key dates
- ?: Renamed Sutton-on-Sea
Location

Sutton-on-Sea railway station was a station in Sutton-on-Sea, Lincolnshire. It opened on 4 October 1886 and was a temporary terminus of a branch line from Willoughby. Two years later the line was extended to Mablethorpe. It closed in 1970 and the track was removed a few years after closure. The site is now lost under housing and a road alignment.

Preceding station	Disused railways	Following station
Mumby Road; Line and station closed	Great Northern Railway; Mablethorpe loop railway	Mablethorpe; Line and station closed
