= Grimoldby railway station =

Former railway station in Lincolnshire, England

Coordinates: 53.3726°N 0.0892°E

Grimoldby
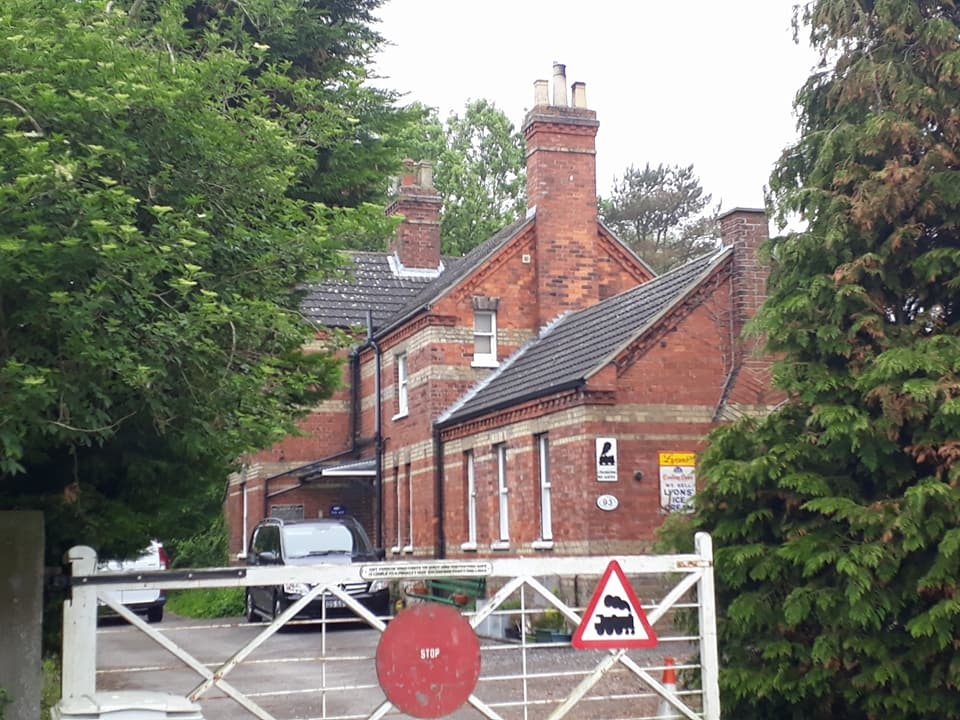
- The former station building in 2018

General information
- Location: England
- Grid reference: TF390882

Other information
- Status: Disused

History
- Original company: Louth and East Coast Railway
- Pre-grouping: Great Northern Railway (Great Britain)
- Post-grouping: London & North Eastern Railway

Key dates
- 17 October 1877: Opened
- 5 December 1960: Closed
Location

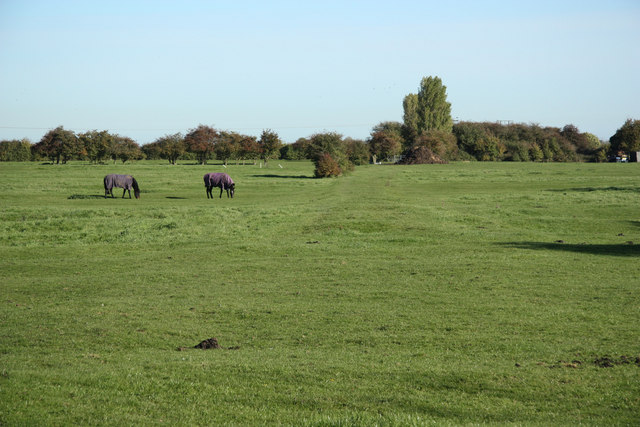
Mablethorpe Loop Line Course of the old railway line at Grimoldby, seen from Eastfield Lane

Grimoldy railway station was a station in Grimoldby, Lincolnshire; opened in 1877 by the Louth and East Coast Railway; and closed in 1960.

Preceding station	Disused railways	Following station
Saltfleetby; Line and station closed	Great Northern Railway; Mablethorpe loop railway	Louth; Line and station closed
