= Grimoldby =

Village and civil parish in the East Lindsey district of Lincolnshire, England

Coordinates: 53.3689°N 0.09120°E

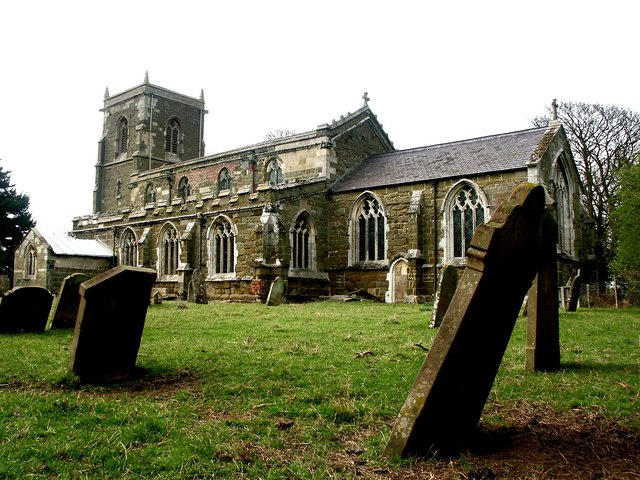
- Church of St Edith, Grimoldby

- Location within Lincolnshire
- OS grid reference: TF392878
  - London: 130 mi (210 km) S
- District: East Lindsey
- Shire county: Lincolnshire
- Region: East Midlands
- Country: England
- Sovereign state: United Kingdom
- Post town: LOUTH
- Postcode district: LN11
- Dialling code: 01507
- Police: Lincolnshire
- Fire: Lincolnshire
- Ambulance: East Midlands
- UK Parliament: Louth and Horncastle

Grimoldby is a village and civil parish in the East Lindsey district of Lincolnshire, England. It is situated 4 miles (6 km) east from Louth.

Grimoldby Grade I listed Anglican church is dedicated to St Edith. It is of early Perpendicular style with embattled and crocketed aisles and clerestory, set with gargoyles.

In 1885 Kelly's Directory reported that the chief crops grown were wheat, barley, beans and oats, and that Grimoldby had three chapels, Wesleyan, Primitive Methodist and Free Methodist, and a National School.

Village amenities include a Co-op supermarket, Grimoldby Primary School, a nursery, an Italian restaurant and a cricket club. There is a public house, called The Manby Arms. Amenities also serve the adjoining village of Manby, which is 0.5 miles (0.8 km) to the south, separated from Grimoldby by the B1200.

Grimoldby used to have a railway station.

== History ==
=== 1987 crash ===
On 3 June 1987 Panavia Tornado 'ZA366' from RAF Marham crashed near to RAF Manby airfield at 5.07 p.m. Both pilots ejected.

== Governance ==
An electoral ward in the same name exists. Grimoldby is in the centre of this ward which had a population taken at the 2011 census of 2181.
