= Mablethorpe railway station =

Former railway station in Lincolnshire, England

Mablethorpe
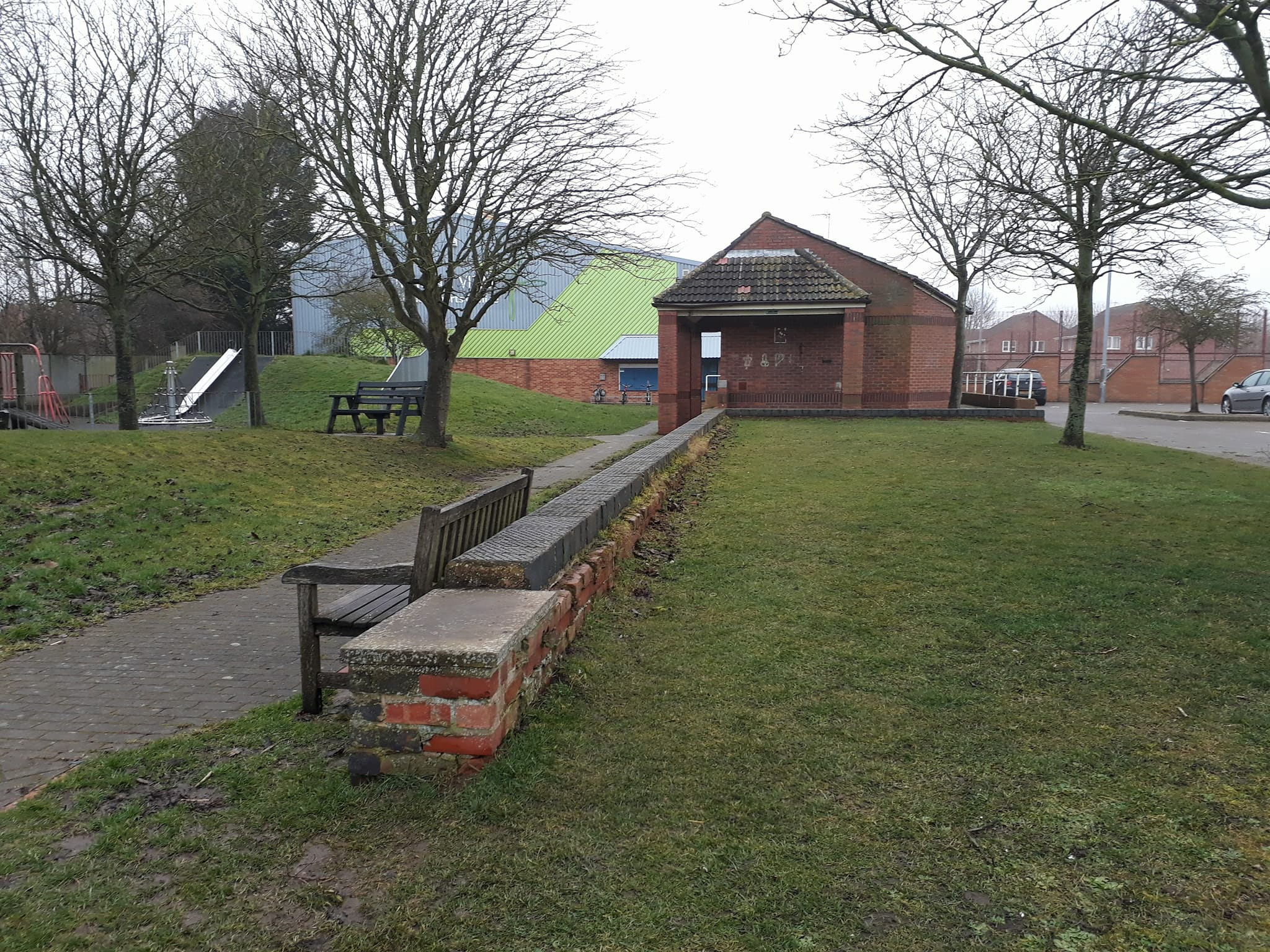
- The former station site at Mablethorpe.

General information
- Location: Mablethorpe, Lincolnshire; England
- Coordinates: 53.3410°N 0.2583°E
- Grid reference: TF504850
- Platforms: 4

Other information
- Status: Disused

History
- Opened: 17 October 1877
- Closed: 5 October 1970
- Original company: Louth and East Coast Railway
- Pre-grouping: Great Northern Railway
- Post-grouping: LNER
Location

Mablethorpe railway station was a station in the town of Mablethorpe, Lincolnshire, which is now closed. The station was demolished soon after closure. From 1985 to 2023 only a short section of platform survived, forming a wall of a flower bed in a public garden. It was cleared in 2023 and a leisure centre now takes its place.

The station was situated on the north side of High Street, between the present-day Station Road and Alexandra Road.

In March 2021, a bid was submitted to restore the line to Mablethorpe as part of the third round of the Restoring Your Railway fund.

Preceding station	Disused railways	Following station
Sutton-on-Sea	Great Northern Railway; Mablethorpe loop railway	Theddlethorpe
