= A-Fields natural gas fields =

Natural gas reserviors in the North Sea

The A-Fields (Audrey, Ann, Alison and Annabel) are natural gas reservoirs and gas production facilities in the southern North Sea; about 123 km east of Spurn Head, Yorkshire. The fields produced natural gas from 1988 to 2016.

== The A-fields ==
The Ann gas field was discovered as early as May 1966 and Audrey in March 1976 but there was limited local infrastructure to transport gas to shore. The Lincolnshire Offshore Gas Gathering System (LOGGS) was commissioned in 1988 and designed to act as a hub and central gas processing, compression and transport facility for the area. Gas from LOGGS was routed to the Theddlethorpe gas terminal.

The Audrey field is located in the UK Offshore Blocks 49/11a and 49/15a. The field was initially developed and operated by Phillips Petroleum Co. Ltd., later ConocoPhillips, then by Spirit Energy. The Ann field is in Block 49/06 and 48/10a and was developed by Phillips, later ConocoPhillips, then by Spirit Energy. Alison in Block 49/11a was originally licensed to Phillips. Annabel was in Block 48/10a and was also originally licensed to Phillips, it was designed to produce gas from the Saturn gas field.

The gas reservoirs in the A-Fields are Upper Leman Sandstone Formation of the Lower Permian Rotliegend Group.

Phillips had assigned the letter 'A' to the license; all the prospects were given female names starting with 'A'.

== Development ==
The A-Fields were developed by a number of platforms, subsea structures and pipelines.

The design parameters of the Audrey and Ann production facilities are summarised in the table.

Audrey and Ann installations
Installation	Audrey A (WD)	Audrey B (XW)	Audrey WM	Ann A4	Ann (XM)
Block	49/11a	48/15	49/11a	49/06	49/02
Coordinates	53°32.37809′N 02°00.86304′E	53°34.06775′N 01°58.16642′E	53°32.42530′N 02°00.45707′E	57.715556°N 2.056111°E	53°42.88684′N 02°03.29081′E
Installation type	Fixed steel platform	Fixed steel platform	Subsea wellhead	Subsea wellhead	Subsea wellhead
Installed	1987	1990		1993	1993
Water depth, metres	27	30	27	29	29
Substructure weight, tonnes	1,063	865	34.62		2 x 13.2
Topsides weight, tonnes	1,276	1,298	–	–	–
No. of legs	4	4	–	–	–
No. of Wells	10	4	1	1	2
Gas export to	LOGGS PP	Audrey A	Audrey A	Ann XM	LOGGS
Export pipeline length, diameter	16.9 km, 20-inch	4.4 km, 14-inch	0.492 km, 8-inch	0.128 km, 6-inch	41.8 km, 12-inch
Pipeline number	PL496	PL723	PL575	PL2164	PL947

The design parameters of the Alison, Annabel and Ensign production facilities are summarised in the table.

Alison, Annabel and Ensign installations
Installation	Alison (KX)	Annabel AB1	Annabel AB2	Annabel template	Ensign
Block	49/11a	48/10a	48/10a	48/10a	48/14a
Coordinates	53.509234°N 2.169722°E	53.675000°N 1.925000°E	53.682500°N 1.925000°E	53.681633°N 01.923609°E	53°35.4322′N 1°46.3988′E
Installation type	Subsea wellhead	Subsea wellhead	Subsea wellhead	Subsea manifold	Fixed steel platform
Installed	1995	2005	2005	2005	2011
Water depth, metres	23	30	30	30	23
Substructure weight, tonnes					582
Topsides weight, tonnes	–	–	–	–	530
No. of legs	–	–	–	–	4
No. of Wells	1	1	1	–	3
Gas export to	Alison Tee on the Ann to LOGGS pipeline	Annabel template	Annabel template	Audrey A	Audrey A
Export pipeline length, diameter	0.048 km, 8-inch	0.037 km, 8-inch	0.133 km, 8-inch	17.8 km, 10-inch	17 km, 10-inch
Pipeline number	PL947	PL2066JW12	PL2066JWAB2	PL2066	PL2838

In addition to the gas production pipelines there were also 3-inch methanol pipelines from LOGGS to Audrey A and B and to Ensign. There were also control umbilicals to the subsea wellheads.

== Gas production ==
A summary of the key gas production data for the A-Fields is shown in the table.

A-Fields gas production
Field	Audrey	Ann	Alison	Annabel	Ensign
Start of production	1988	1993	1995	2005	2012
Peak flow, million cubic metres/y	2,413	488	81	901	150
Year of peak flow	1990	1994	1996	2006	2013
Cumulative production to end of 2014, million cubic metres	19,796	2,869	697	3,413	255
Production ceased	May 2016	2012	2010	May 2016	2018

Gas production profile, in mcm/y, for Audrey

== Decommissioning ==
The Alison and Ann fields had reached the end of their economic lives in 2010 and 2012 and were closed-in. Audrey was shut down in 2016. Ensign was still operating but the closure of LOGGS and Theddlethorpe gas terminal in August 2018 closed the gas export route; when no alternative export route was found the Ensign installation was decommissioned.

== See also ==
- List of oil and gas fields of the North Sea
- Theddlethorpe Gas Terminal
- Lincolnshire Offshore Gas Gathering System
- Easington Catchment Area
- Planets gas fields
