= Ravenspurn gas fields =

Natural gas fields in the North Sea

- Country: United Kingdom
- Region: North Sea
- Location/blocks: 42/30, 42/29, 43/26a,
- Offshore/onshore: Offshore
- Operators: see text
- Owner: see text

Field history
- Discovery: South 1983, North 1984
- Start of production: South 1989, North 1990

Production
- Producing formations: Sandstones

The Ravenspurn gas fields are two adjacent natural gas fields (Ravenspurn South and Ravenspurn North) located in the UK sector of the southern North Sea about 65 km east of Flambrough Head, Yorkshire.

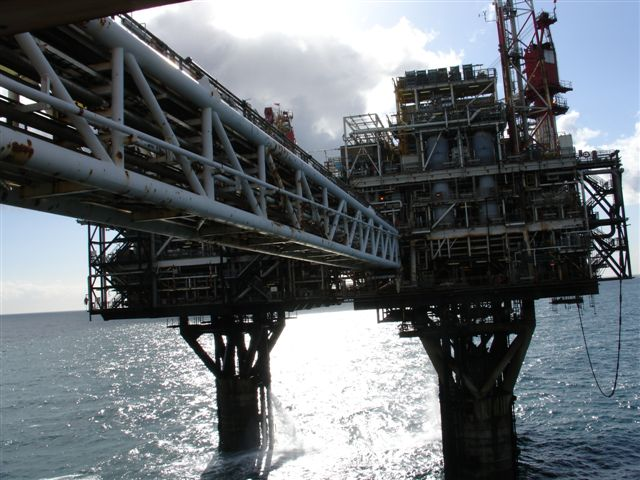
Ravenspurn North CPP

== The fields ==
Ravenspurn South is principally located in Block 42/30 and extends into Blocks 42/29 and 43/26a of the southern North Sea. Ravenspurn was one of the 'Villages' gas fields; named after villages lost to the sea along the Holderness coast. These villages include: Cleeton, Dimlington, Hoton, Hyde, Newsham and Ravenspurn.

The gas reservoir is a Permian sandstone and has a porosity of 23% and a permeability of 90 md. The field was discovered in April 1983 and has recoverable reserves of 18.0 billion cubic metres. First gas was produced in October 1989.

Ravenspurn North is located in Block 43/26a of the North Sea and extends into Block 42/30. The reservoir is a Lower Leman sandstone of the Rotliegendes group with a variable porosity and permeability. The field was discovered in October 1984 and the recoverable reserves were 35.1 billion cubic metres. First gas was produced in 1990.

== Owners and operators ==
In 1993 Blocks 42/30 and 42/29 (Ravenspurn South) were both licensed to BP Exploration Operating Co. Ltd. (100 %). Block 43/26a (Ravenspurn South and North) was licensed to: ARCO British Ltd. (25.0%), Enterprise Oil plc (20.0%), Hamilton Oil Great Britain plc (15.0%), LASMO Ltd. (15.0%), Hardy Oil and Gas (UK) Ltd. (10.0%), Hamilton Brothers Petroleum (UK) Ltd. (7.5%), Monument Resources Ltd. (7.5%).

Ravenspurn South was developed by BP which remained operator until 2012, when Perenco assumed operatorship.

Ravenspurn North was developed by Hamilton Brothers which remained the operator until 1998 when BP assumed operatorship. In 2012 Perenco acquired BP’s interest and became the operator.

== Development ==
The Ravenspurn South field was developed by BP through three normally unattended offshore platforms Ravenspurn South A, B and C.

Ravenspurn South Platforms
Platform	Block	Coordinates	Type	Water depth, m	Function	Installed	Wellheads	First gas
Ravenspurn South A	42/30	54.035833N 0.975000E	Steel jacket	48	Wellheads and production	1989	6	October 1989
Ravenspurn South B	42/30	54.060000N 0.999278E	Steel jacket	48	Wellheads and production	1989	11	October 1989
Ravenspurn South C	42/30	54.086944N 0.829722E	Steel jacket	48	Wellheads and production	1989	5	October 1989

On RA and RB the fluids from the wellheads are combined and routed to a 3-phase separator on each platform. Gas from the Separator is routed to the 16-inch pipeline to Cleeton, together with the condensate from the Separator. Separated water is discharged to the sea. On RC there is no separator, well fluids are routed directly by pipeline to Cleeton. The pipeline has a maximum operating pressure of 248.3 bar. In the first year of peak production (1991) the field produced 1.60 billion cubic metres of gas.

Ravenspurn North was developed by Hamilton Brothers as a main manned complex and two satellite platforms ST2 and ST3.

Ravenspurn North Platforms
Platform	Block	Coordinates	Type	Water depth, m	Function	Configuration	Installed
Ravenspurn North CPP	43/26a	54.060111N 0.900167E	Concrete gravity base	45	Production and accommodation	Bridge linked	1990
Ravenspurn WT1	43/26a	54.060111N 0.900167E	Steel jacket	45	Wellheads	Bridge linked	1990
Ravenspurn ST2	43/26a	54.060111N 0.900167E	Steel jacket	45	Wellheads and production	Satellite	1990
Ravenspurn ST3	42/30	54.073333N 0.914722E	Steel jacket	45	Wellheads and production	Satellite	1990

The Ravenspurn North Central Production Platform (CPP) is a concrete gravity base structure, the only example in the southern North Sea. It is a three leg structure supporting a production and accommodation topside. It is bridge linked to WT1 wellhead platform.

=== Ravenspurn North CPP Processing ===
Well fluids from the wellhead tower are routed to one of two 3-phase Separators depending on the pressure of the fluids. High pressure gas from the high pressure HP Separator is dehydrated by counter current contact with glycol in a contact tower. It is then metered and exported to the Cleeton platform by a 24-inch pipeline. The pipeline has a maximum operating pressure of 149 bar and is 28 km long. Gas from the lower pressure LP Separator is routed to a 2-stage 3-train compression train. Compressed gas is dehydrated in a glycol contact tower and mixed with the HP gas prior to the metering skid. Condensate from the separators is collected in the Condensate Separator and from there to the Condensate Coalescer. It is then metered and pumped into the gas export line. Water from the Separators is routed to the oily water coalescer and then discharged overboard.

Fluids from the satellite platforms (ST2 and ST3) are exported to the central complex. Upon arrival they are routed to a slug catcher, gas is routed to the inlet of the appropriate Glycol Contactor. Liquids are routed to the Condensate Separator and then the Condensate Coalescer prior to export through the gas pipeline.

In the first year of peak production (1992) the field produced 3.50 billion cubic metres of gas.

Ravenspurn North also receives fluid from the subsea Johnston field. Upon arrival at RN fluid flows to a slug catcher, gas is routed to the inlet of the appropriate Glycol Contactor. Liquids are routed to the Condensate Separator and then the Condensate Coalescer.

=== Production ===
The cumulative gas production from the start until the end of 2014 was 28,245 million m^{3}

Gas production profile (in million m^{3}) for Ravernspurn North

The cumulative gas production from the start until the end of 2014 was 16,796 million m^{3}.

Gas production profile (in million m^{3}) for Ravernspurn South

== See also ==
- List of oil and gas fields of the North Sea
- Easington gas terminal
- Arthurian gas fields
- Planets gas fields
- Cleeton gas field and hub
