= Linda Cook =

Linda Cook may refer to:

- Linda Cook (actress) (1948–2012), American actress
- Linda Cook (businesswoman) (born 1958), American CEO
- the victim in the murder of Linda Cook
