= Viking gas field =

Group of natural gas and associated condensate fields under the North Sea

- Country: United Kingdom
- Region: Southern North Sea
- Location/blocks: 49/12, 49/16 and 49/17
- Offshore/onshore: Offshore
- Coordinates: 53°26′53″N 2°19′59″E
- Operator: Conoco UK Ltd. ConocoPhillips
- Owner: Conoco UK Ltd. ConocoPhillips
- Partner: Britoil plc

Field history
- Discovery: 1965
- Start of production: 1972
- Peak of production: 1977
- Abandonment: 2018

Production
- Recoverable gas: 79.3×10^{9} m^{3} (2.80×10^{12} cu ft)
- Producing formations: Rotliegendes

The Viking gas field is a group of natural gas and associated condensate fields located under the southern North Sea about 85 miles (136 km) from the Lincolnshire coast. The field was in production from 1972 to 2018.

== The field ==
The Viking gas field is a group of natural gas accumulations under the UK North Sea. The field is named after the area of the North Sea beneath which the field is located. The gas reservoir is a Rotliegendes sandstone of Lower to Middle Permian age, at a depth of 9,100–10,200 feet (2,773–3,110 m) with a thickness of 200–500 feet (61–150 m). The Viking structures run north-west to south-east and extend over Blocks 49/12, 49/16 and 49/17. The field was discovered in 1965 and production started in 1972. The original gas in place amounted to 79.3 billion cubic metres. Gas and associated condensate from Viking A and Viking B were both exported via the Viking A field through a 28-inch diameter pipeline to the Viking gas terminal (renamed the Theddlethorpe gas terminal in 1988), Lincolnshire.

The Victor, Victoria and Vixen fields are adjacent to Viking and production from these fields is routed through the Viking offshore facilities.

The Viking and Victor gas compositions and properties are as follows.

Viking and Victor gas properties
Composition	North Viking %	South Viking %	Victor
Methane	89	89	91
Ethane	6	6	3.6
Propane	1.4	1.4	1.0
Carbon dioxide	2	2	2.5
Gas gravity	0.61	0.61	0.604
Mean condensate content	3–6 bbl/million cu ft	3–6 bbl/million cu ft	1.8 bbl/million cu ft
Calorific value	1030 Btu/cu ft	1030 Btu/cu ft	1020 Btu/cu ft

=== Ownership ===
The field was originally licensed to Conoco UK Ltd, later ConocoPhillips. In 2019 Chrysaor assumed the ownership of Conoco-Phillips North Sea Assets. In March 2021 Chrysaor Holdings merged with Premier Oil to form Harbour Energy.

== Development ==
The Viking field was developed through a number of offshore installations. These are summarized in the following tables.

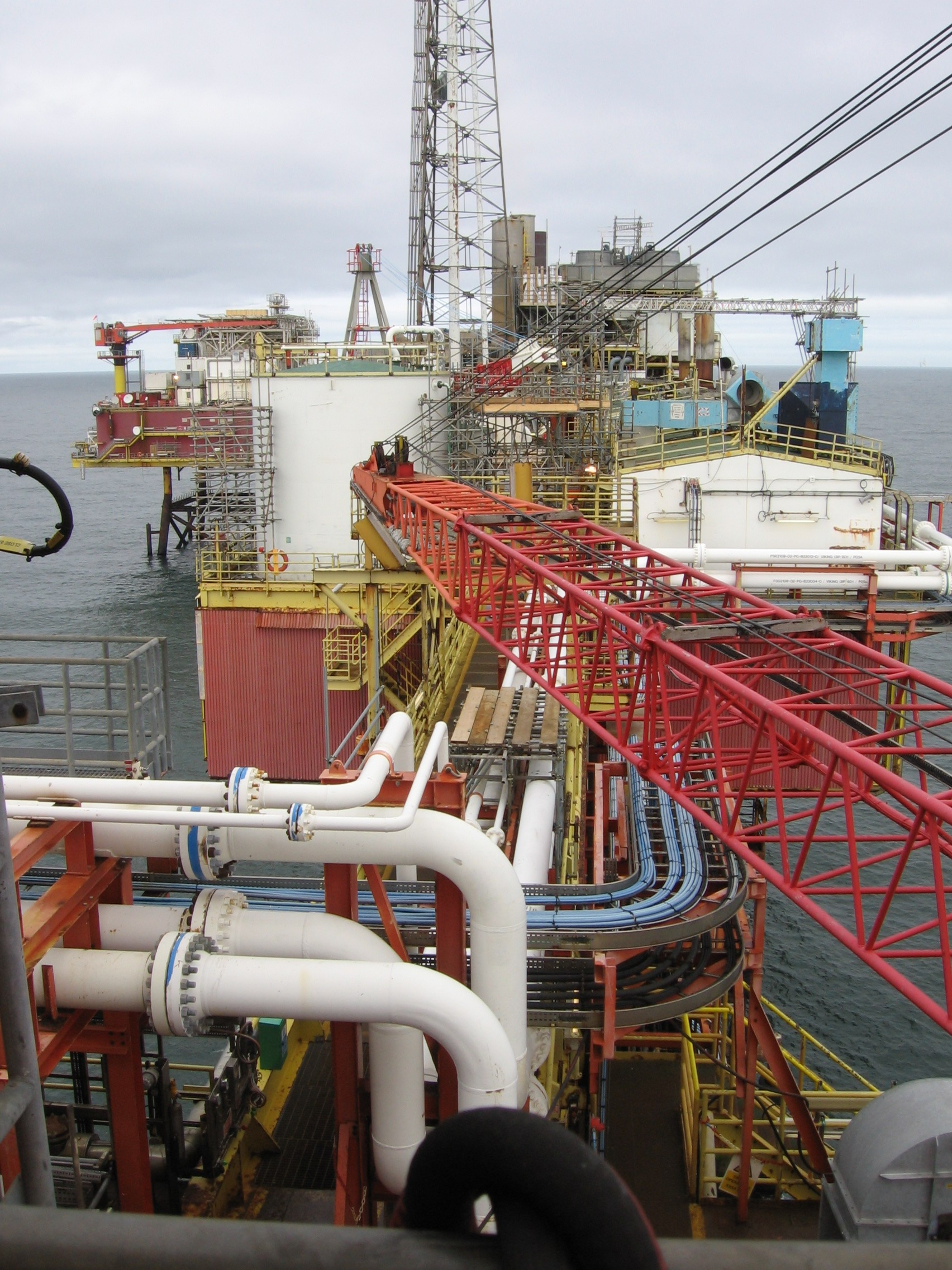
ConocoPhillips Viking B offshore platforms

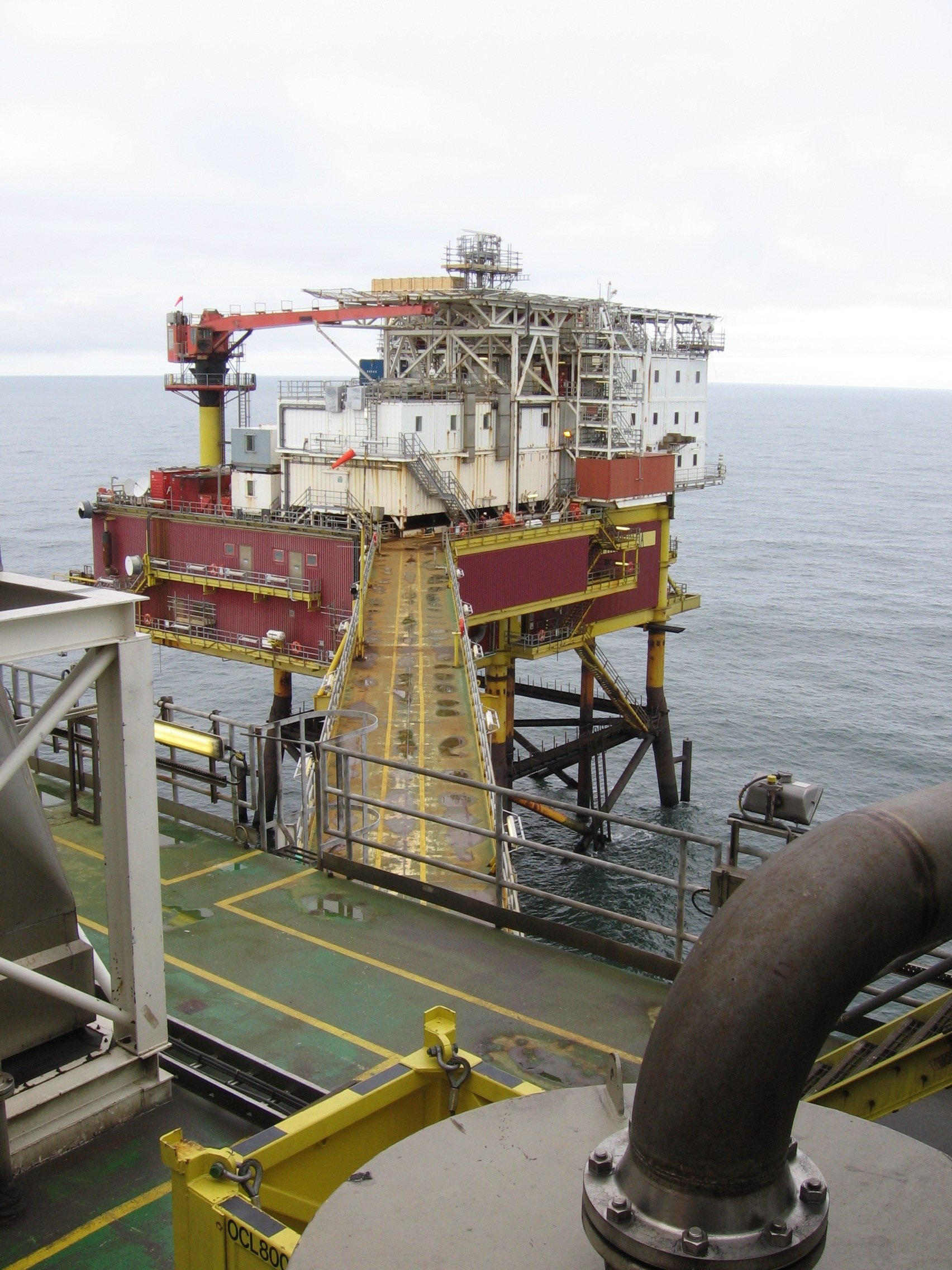
ConocoPhillips Viking BA North Sea offshore platform

Viking offshore installations
Installation	Location Block	Facility	Function	Type	Legs	Well slots	Installed	Production start	Production to
Viking A complex	49/12	AD platform	Drilling	Steel jacket	8	11	December 1970	August 1972	Viking AP
Viking A complex	49/12	AP platform	Processing	Steel jacket	8	–	March 1971	August 1972	Theddlethorpe gas terminal
Viking A complex	49/12	AR platform	Pipeline risers	Steel jacket	6	–	July 1971	1972	Viking AP
Viking A complex	49/12	AC platform	Compression	Steel jacket	8	–	June 1975	February 1976	Viking AP
Viking A complex	49/12	FD platform	Drilling	Steel jacket	4	4	July 1975	July 1976	Viking AD
Viking B complex	49/17	BD platform	Drilling	Steel jacket	8	11	May 1972	August 1973	Viking BP
Viking B complex	49/17	BP platform	Processing	Steel jacket	8	–	June 1972	August 1973	Viking AR
Viking B complex	49/17	BC platform	Compression	Steel jacket	8	–	June 1975	July 1977	Viking BP
Viking B complex	49/17	BA platform	Accommodation	Steel jacket	4	–	1992	–	–
Viking CD	49/17	CD platform	Drilling and processing	Steel jacket	6	4	February 1974	December 1974	Viking B
Viking DD	49/17	DD platform	Drilling and processing	Steel jacket	8	4	May 1974	October 1974	Viking B
Viking ED	49/16	ED platform	Drilling and processing	Steel jacket	8	4	October 1974	November 1975	Viking B
Viking GD	49/17	GD platform	Drilling and processing	Steel jacket	6	4	June 1975	July 1977	Viking B
Viking HD	49/17	HD platform	Drilling and processing	Steel jacket	6	4	July 1974	April 1975	Viking B
Viking KD	49/12	KD platform	Production	Steel jacket	3	6	1998	1998	Viking BD
Viking LD	49/17	LD platform	Production	Steel jacket	3	6	1998	1998	Viking BD

=== Satellite fields ===
The satellite fields which exported gas via the Viking B complex were:

Installation	Location Block	Facility	Function	Type	Legs	Well slots	Installed	Production start	Production to
Victor JD	49/22	JD platform	Production	Steel jacket	4	8	June 1984	September 1984	Viking BD
Victor JM	49/22	Subsea well	Production	Subsea	–		1995	1995	Victor JM
Victoria SM	49/17	Subsea well	Production	Subsea	–		2008	2008	Viking BD
Vixen VM	49/17	Subsea well	Production	Subsea	–	1	2000	2000	Viking BD

== Production ==
Annual gas production from the Viking field (in millions of standard cubic feet)

Export from the Viking B field was originally routed to the shore terminal via Viking AR. From 2009 export was re-routed to shore via the LOGGS installation.

== Decommissioning ==
The Viking A field (Viking North) was decommissioned as uneconomical in 1991. The A field platforms (except AR) were removed in 1993–4.

Viking CD, DD, ED, GD & HD ceased production in 2011–15, and were removed in 2017–18.

Theddlethorpe gas terminal was permanently shut-down in August 2018. Production from all connected fields ceased.

== See also ==
- Indefatigable gas field
- Leman gas field
- West Sole gas field
- Hewett gas field
- Lincolnshire Offshore Gas Gathering System
- Pickerill and Juliet gas fields
- Caister Murdoch System
