= Lincolnshire Offshore Gas Gathering System =

Lincolnshire Offshore Gas Gathering System (LOGGS)
- Country: United Kingdom
- Region: southern North Sea
- Location/blocks: 49/16
- Offshore/onshore: Offshore
- Coordinates: 53°23’27”N 02°00’13”E
- Operators: Conoco, ConocoPhillips, Chrysaor
- Owner: Conoco, ConocoPhillips, Chrysaor

Field history
- Start of production: 1988
- Abandonment: 2018

The Lincolnshire Offshore Gas Gathering System (LOGGS) was a major natural gas collection, processing and transportation complex in the UK sector of the southern North Sea. It comprised five bridge-linked platforms about 118 km east of the Lincolnshire coast, which operated from 1988 to 2018.

== Background ==
The development of the Audrey, North Valliant, South Valiant, Vanguard and Vulcan gas fields across several North Sea Blocks (49/11a, 49/16, 49/21, 49/16, 48/25b respectively) required the provision of a central collection, processing and transportation hub to deliver the combined gas output to the onshore Theddlethorpe gas terminal. The LOGGS complex was built to meet these requirements and with provisions to collect gas from future fields.

The LOGGS facility was principally owned and operated by Conoco, this became ConocoPhillips in 2002. Following cessation of production Chrysaor, a subsidiary of Harbour Energy, assumed ownership of LOGGS in 2019.

== The LOGGS installation ==
The LOGGS installation was located in UK offshore Block 49/16, coordinates 53°23’27”N 02°00’13”E, the water depth is 21 metres.

The installation initially comprised three bridge-linked platforms. These were North Valliant wellhead platform (PD), a Processing platform (PP), and an Accommodation platform (PA). These were commissioned in 1988. To allow lower pressure wells to produce gas a Compression platform (PC) was added to the complex. To cater for production from additional fields a Riser platform (PR) was added to the complex in 1993.

The parameters of the platforms were as follows.

The LOGGS Complex
Platform	Function	Legs	Jacket weight, tonnes	Topsides weight, tonnes
LOGGS PD	Wellheads	4	1324	602
LOGGS PP	Processing	8	2347	3950
LOGGS PA	Accommodation	4	1444	2418
LOGGS PC	Compression	8	2109	4752
LOGGS PR	Import risers	4	1870	2499

=== Import and export ===
The import and export pipelines connected to the installation were as shown in the following tables. Pipelines were connected to the PP and PR platforms only, there were no pipeline riser connections to the PC, PA or PD platforms.

LOGGS Import pipelines
Pipeline number	LOGGS Platform	From installation	Other connected installations	Fluid	Diameter	Length. km	Installed
PL456	PP	Vanguard QD	–	Well fluids	10”	7.5	1988
PL458	PP	Vulcan RD	Vulcan UR	Well fluids	18”	16.0	1988
PL460	PP	South Valiant TD	–	Well fluids	10”	10.6	1988
PL470	PP	North Valiant SP	–	Well fluids	10”	4.3	1988
PL496	PP	Audrey A WD	Audrey VM, Audrey XW, Annabel, Ensign	Well fluids	20”	4.3	1988
PL455	PP	Theddlethorpe	–	Methanol	4”	118.3	1988
PL854	PP	Anglia YD	Anglia YM	Well fluids	12”	23.6	1988
PL947	PR	Ann XM	Ann A4, Alison KX	Well fluids	12”	41.8	1993
PL1093	PR	Ganymede XD	Callisto ZM, Europa EZ, NW Bell ZX	Well fluids	18”	19.1	1993
PL1692	PR	Vampire OD	Viscount VO	Well fluids	12”	9.2	1999
PL2107	PR	Saturn ND	Mimas MN, Tethys TN	Well fluids	14”	43.2	2005
PL2643	PR	Viking BP	All Viking satellites	Well fluids	16”	19.1	2009
PL2811	PR	Clipper South RL	–	Well fluids	12”	15.1	2012

The export pipelines connected to the installation were as follows.

LOGGS Export pipelines
Pipeline number	LOGGS Platform	To	Fluid	Diameter	Length. km	Installed
PL494	PP	Theddlethorpe	Gas & condensate	36”	118.3	1988
PL457	PP	Vanguard QD	Methanol	3”	7.5	1988
PL459	PP	Vulcan RD	Methanol	3”	16.0	1988
PL461	PP	South Valiant TD	Methanol	3”	10.6	1988
PL471	PP	North Valiant SP	Methanol	3”	4.3	1988
PL497	PP	Audrey A WD	Methanol	3”	16.5	1988
PL855	PP	Anglia YD	Methanol	3”	23.6	1988
PL1094	PR	Ganymede ZD	Methanol	3”	19.1	1993
PL1693	PR	Vampire OD	Methanol	3”	9.2	1999
PL2108	PR	Saturn ND	Methanol	3”	43.2	2005
PL2644	PR	Viking BP	Methanol	3”	19.1	2009
PL2811	PR	Clipper South RL	Methanol	3”	15.4	2012

=== Process facilities ===
Upon arrival at LOGGS PP or PR the fluids from the satellite platforms and subsea completions were routed to their respective 3-phase Inlet Separators, where the fluids were separated into vapour, water/methanol and condensate. Each of these streams was metered. The condensate and methanol/water streams were recombined and routed to a Condensate Surge Drum from where Condensate Pumps injected the liquids into the gas trunk line to Thedlethorpe. There were two condensate handling systems one on PP and one on PR.

Platform PD was a wellhead platform for the North Valiant field designated North Valliant 1. Well fluids were routed across the bridge to PP and combined with fluids from North Valiant SP (North Valiant 2) and flowed to the North Valiant Separator.

Each of the satellite gas streams could be routed to either the suction manifold, the interstage manifold or directly to the discharge manifold depending on the gas pressure. The compression facility had three trains of two stage compression. From the suction manifold gas flowed to the First Stage Suction Drum where liquids were removed. Gas was compressed in the First Stage Compressor and flowed through the Interstage Cooler where it combined with gas from the interstage manifold. The combined gas stream flowed to the Second Stage Suction Drum where liquids were removed. Gas was compressed in the Second Stage Compressor and flowed through the Aftercooler and then to the 36” trunk line to Theddlethorpe.

Fuel gas for powering the compressor and electricity generation gas turbines could be taken from the interstage or the discharge manifolds.

=== Throughput ===
The gas throughput in million cubic metres per year (mcm/y) for some of the fields which flowed through LOGGS were as follows.

Field	Peak production, mcm/y	Peak year
Vanguard	437	1989
Vulcan	1,941	1989
South Valiant	1,294	1991
North Valiant	680	1991
Audrey	2,800	1990
Anglia	600	1992
Ann	500	1994
Ganymede	1,706	1996
Vampire	727	2000
Saturn	1,598	2007
Clipper South	587	2014

=== Terminal redevelopment ===
As a consequence of the LOGGS development new gas reception and processing facilities were commissioned at the Theddlethorpe gas terminal. A second 30-inch line (Feeder No. 17) was laid from the Theddlethorpe terminal to Hatton Lincolnshire where it connected to the 36-inch National Transmission System Wisbech to Scunthorpe line (Feeder No. 7).

== Incidents ==
In November 2012 there was a major gas release on LOGGS. ConocoPhillips were fined £3 million in the subsequent prosecution.

In May 2016 the Low Pressure Vent Knock Out Drum became liquid locked which led to significant release of gas into the workplace.

== Decommissioning ==
The Theddletorpe Gas Terminal closed in August 2018. Gas export from LOGGS and its satellite ceased. The following installations were shut-down: Vanguard QD, Vulcan RD, South Valiant TD, North Valiant SP, North Valiant PD, Audrey A WD, Anglia YD, Ganymede ZD, Vampire OD, Saturn ND, a Viking BP. Subsequently their wells were plugged and abandoned and all structures above the seabed were removed.

Gas production from Clipper South, owned by Ineos, was rerouted via a new pipeline to Shell’s Clipped Complex and from there to Bacton Gas Terminal.

In March 2021 Chrysaor submitted plans to decommission and remove the LOGGS installation. It envisages that the platforms would be removed in 2022-23, debris clearance would continue until 2024 and that close out would be in 2025-26.

== See also ==
- Arthurian gas fields
- Planets gas fields
- Viking gas field
- Theddlethorpe Gas Terminal
- List of oil and gas fields of the North Sea
- Caister Murdoch System
- Pickerill and Juliet gas fields
- Clipper gas field
- A-Fields natural gas fields
