= Theddlethorpe Gas Terminal =

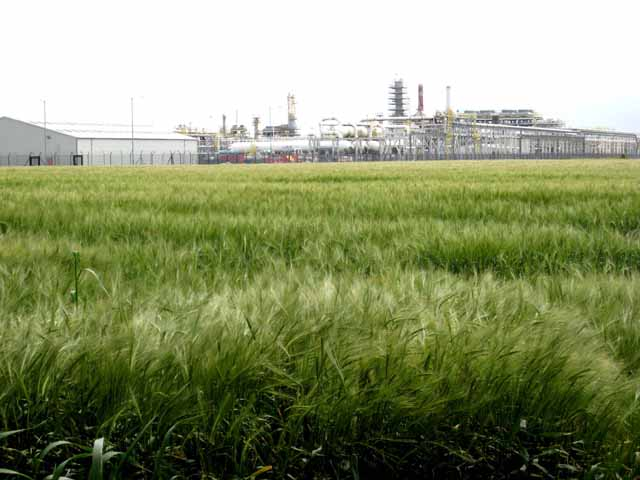
- Seen from the north

- Location within Lincolnshire
- Former names: Viking Gas Terminal
- Alternative names: TGT

General information
- Type: Gas terminal
- Location: Theddlethorpe St Helen, LN12 1NQ
- Coordinates: 53.362°N 0.233°E
- Completed: 1972
- Inaugurated: 1972
- Owner: Harbour Energy

Technical details
- Floor area: 200 acres (0.81 km^{2})

Theddlethorpe Gas Terminal (TGT) is a former gas terminal on the Lincolnshire coast on Mablethorpe Road at Theddlethorpe St Helen close to Mablethorpe in East Lindsey in England. It is just off the A1031 and next door to a holiday camp and Mablethorpe Seal Sanctuary and Wildlife Centre (Animal Gardens).

== History ==
From December 1969, there were plans for the terminal proposed by the Gas Council. Planning permission was given in April 1970. It was built in 1972 to receive gas from the Viking gas field from 4 July 1972, being the UK's third main gas terminal when owned by Conoco. The first stage cost around £5 million. A new 86-mile (138 km) 28-inch (710 mm) offshore gas pipeline had to be built for the plant. It was originally called the Viking Gas Terminal, changing to its current name in 1984.

In the early 1990s, a new pipeline was built to the terminal by Kinetica, a company jointly owned by PowerGen and Conoco. The pipeline to Killingholme was opened by Tim Eggar on 21 July 1992.

== Operation ==
The main site was owned by ConocoPhillips, with pipelines to National Grid's National Transmission System, and E.ON's 20-inch (510 mm) Killingholme Pipeline System to both Killingholme A power station and Killingholme B power station, transporting 256,000 m3/h at a pressure of 40-55 bar. 10% of the UK's ever increasing gas requirements came from Theddlethorpe. By August 2018 gas production through Theddlethorpe was about 4 million standard cubic metres (mscm) per day representing about 2.5% of the UK seasonal demand of 160 mscm per day. Around one hundred people worked on the site. The 30-inch line from the NTS terminal (Feeder No. 8) is routed to Hatton Lincolnshire where it connected to the 36-inch NTS Wisbech to Scunthorpe line (Feeder No. 7). In 1988, in association with the LOGGS development a second 30-inch line (Feeder No. 17) was laid from the Theddlethorpe terminal to Hatton.

In 2017 ConocoPhillips announced that the Theddlethorpe terminal was to close in 2018. Production from Theddlethorpe ceased at 05:00 on 15 August 2018.

=== Offshore pipeline systems ===
These are in the UK Southern North Sea Basin, part of the UK Continental Shelf (UKCS). There were four major pipeline systems:

- Lincolnshire Offshore Gas Gathering System (LOGGS) collected gas from the V-field series of gas fields plus Audrey WD, WM & XW, Annabel, Alison KX, Ann XM, Anglia YM YD, Jupiter, Saturn ND, Mimas MN, Tethys TN, Ganymede ZD, Europa EZ, N.W. Bell ZX and Callisto ZM. A 118km 36-inch diameter pipeline transported gas from the LOGGS PP installation to Theddlethorpe, it was commissioned in 1988, and ceased production in August 2018. The LOGGS installation comprised five bridge-linked platforms PR (riser), PC (compression), PP (production), PA (accommodation) and PD (drilling).
- Caister Murdoch System (CMS) collected gas from the Boulton BM, Boulton H HM, Caister CM, Cavendish RM, Hawksley EM, Hunter HK, Kelvin TM, Ketch KA, McAdam MM, Munro MH, Murdoch MD, Schooner SA, and Watt QM gas fields. A 188 km 26-inch pipeline transported gas from the Murdoch installation to Theddlethorpe, it was commissioned in 1993, and ceased production in August 2018.
- The Viking field collected gas from the Viking, Victor JM & JD, Victoria SM and Vixen VM fields. The Viking Transportation System (VTS) transported gas from the Viking B complex (bridge-linked platforms BA, BD, BP, BC) via a 26.9 km 16-inch pipeline to the LOGGS complex for onward transmission to Theddlethorpe. The Viking B field originally exported gas via a 10.9 km 24-inch pipeline to the Viking AR platform and thence via a 138 km 28-inch pipeline, commissioned in July 1972, to Theddlethorpe, these lines were disused from 2009 when the VTS was commissioned.
- Pickerill field a 66 km 24-inch pipeline transported gas from the Pickerill A installation to Theddlethorpe, it was commissioned in 1992 and ceased production in August 2018. The Juliet gas field was tied into Pickerill A in 2014.

=== Natural gas liquids ===
Liquids from the refinery operation were transferred to Phillips 66's (previously ConocoPhillip's when the two companies were one) Humber Refinery next door to the Killingholme Power Station (ICHP), twenty six miles away to the north-west of Theddlethorpe.

== Gas fields ==
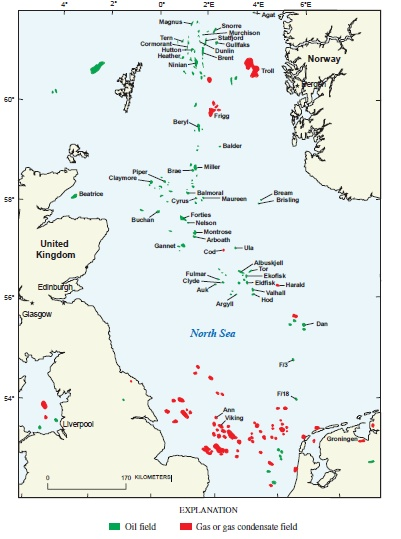
Oil and gas fields in the North Sea

The following gas fields produced fluids to the Theddlethorpe gas terminal.

=== Viking ===
The main field that connected to the terminal was the Viking gas field, via the Viking Transportation System.

The field is 86 miles (138 km) off the Lincolnshire coast, and is in two areas - Viking A and Viking B. It was 50% owned by ConocoPhillips. It had initial recoverable reserves of 125 billion m^{3}.

Production on the North Viking Field (Viking A) began in July 1972 and South Viking (Viking B) in August 1973 after the North Viking field was discovered in March 1969 and South Viking in December 1968. It was initially operated by Conoco and the National Coal Board, then by ConocoPhillips on behalf of BP (former Britoil), and was jointly owned by both. It is close to the Indefatigable field, and a plan was to use the (nearer) Bacton gas plant instead. Production from the Viking gas field was the main incentive to build the Theddlethorpe site. Offshore installations within the field include Viking AR, the Viking B complex (bridge-linked BA, BD, BP & BC), Viking CD, Viking DD, Viking ED, Viking GD, Viking HD, Viking JD, Viking KD & Viking LD. Other Viking A installations were decommissioned in 1991 and removed in 1994. Installations CD, DD, ED, GD and HD ceased production in 2011-15 and were removed in 2017–18.

=== Vixen ===
This field was owned 50:50 by ConocoPhillips Ltd and BP (Britoil plc). Operated by ConocoPhillips. It is 84 miles (135 km) off the Lincolnshire coast. Gas was transported from the Vixen VM subsea wellhead to the terminal via the Viking Transportation System. Production began in October 2000 and was discovered in May 1999. Part of the V field system and named after the de Havilland Sea Vixen.

=== Boulton ===
Owned and run by ConocoPhillips. Subsea wellhead Boulton HM produced gas via the Watt QW subsea template to Murdoch MD, gas from the Boulton BM installation was transported to the terminal via the Caister-Murdoch System (CMS) via the Murdoch field. It was discovered in November 1984 with production starting in December 1997 and named after Matthew Boulton, a colleague of James Watt.

=== Caister ===
It was originally run by Total, and then operated by ConocoPhillips. The Caister installation was designated CM. Gas was transported via the Murdoch field and the Caister Murdoch System (CMS) to the terminal. It was discovered in January 1968 with production starting October 1993 and named after Caister Castle in Norfolk. It was 50% owned by Consort Europe Resources (became part of E.ON Ruhrgas), 21% by GDF Britain Ltd, and 30% by ConocoPhillips. It was latterly owned 40% by E.ON Ruhrgas UK Caister Ltd, 39% by ConocoPhillips UK Ltd, and 21% by GDF Suez E & P UK Ltd.

=== Murdoch ===
The field is 75 miles (121 km) from the Lincolnshire coast. It was run by ConocoPhillips and named the Scottish engineer William Murdoch, a compatriot of James Watt, and who is best known for inventing gas lighting, using coal gas. It was discovered in August 1987 with production starting in October 1993. It was owned 54% by ConocoPhillips, 34% by Tullow Exploration Ltd and 11% by GDF Britain Ltd. It is now owned 59% by ConocoPhillips UK Ltd, 26% by GDF Suez E & P Uk Ltd, and 14% by Tullow Oil SK Ltd. The subsea Murdoch K field (KM) was run by Tullow Oil. The Murdoch installation comprised three bridge-linked platforms designated MD, MC and MA. Gas was transported by the Caister Murdoch System to the terminal.

=== Cavendish ===
The field was owned by RWE Dea AG of Germany (Operator) and Dana Petroleum. It used the Caister Murdoch System and was discovered in January 1989. The Cavendish installation has the field designation RM. Named after the British scientist Henry Cavendish who discovered hydrogen.

=== Saltfleetby ===
The onshore field was discovered in October 1997 and opened in December 1999. Originally run by Roc Oil of Australia, it was latterly operated by Wingas (owned by Gazprom) who bought it in December 2004. The field was only 5 miles from Theddlethorpe and was named after Saltfleetby, the nearest village to the field.

=== Schooner ===
The field opened in October 1996. It was run by Tullow Oil, which it bought from Shell and Esso in 2004. Owned 90% by Tullow Oil SK Ltd, 5% by GDF Britain Ltd, and 5% by E.ON Ruhrgas UK EU Ltd. The Schooner SA installation used the Caister Murdoch System and was discovered in December 1986. Named after the schooner boat.

=== Ketch ===
The field opened in October 1999 and was run by Tullow Oil, which it bought from Shell in 2004. The Ketch KA installation used the Caister Murdoch System. Discovered in November 1984. Named after the ketch boat.

=== Ann ===
Discovered in May 1966. Production bengan in October 1993. Uses the LOGGS system. Was owned 85% by Venture Production (North Sea Developments) Ltd and 15% by Roots Gas Ltd (based in Aberdeen), and latterly owned completely by Venture, who operated the field. It comprised two subsea installations with the field designation Ann A4 and Ann XM. Decommissioned after a decision made in June 2017.

=== Audrey ===
Discovered in March 1976. Production began in October 1988. Used the LOGGS system. Was jointly owned by Conoco and Centrica, and latterly owned by Centrica Energy who operated the field. Field was much larger than the neighbouring Ann field. It comprised a subsea installation Audrey WM and two platforms Audrey 1 WD and Audrey 2 XW. Decommissioned after a decision made in June 2017.

=== Alison ===
Discovered in February 1987 with production starting in October 1995. A small field. Was owned 85% by Venture Production (North Sea Developments) Ltd and 15% by Roots Gas Ltd, and then owned by Centrica Energy (who bought Venture Production plc in 2009), who operated it. Alison is a subsea installation with the field designation KX. Decommissioned after a decision made in June 2017.

=== Anglia ===
Discovered in December 1985, with production starting in November 1991. Was owned 55% by CalEnergy Gas (UK) Ltd, 32% by Consort North Sea Ltd, 12% by Highland Energy Ltd. Latterly owned 25% by Dana Petroleum (since September 2006), 12% by RWE Dea UK SNS Ltd, 30% by GDF Suez E & P UK Ltd, and 30% by First Oil. Was operated by CalEnergy and then operated by GDF Suez until 2011 since when it was run by Ithaca Energy. Used the LOGGS system. It comprised the subsea installation Anglia YM and platform YD.

=== Pickerill ===
Discovered in December 1984 with production starting in August 1992. Comprised two platforms Pickerill A and Pickerill B. Originally run by ARCO and latterly run by Perenco. Was owned 43% by ARCO British Ltd, 23% by AGIP (UK) Ltd, 23% by Superior Oil (UK) Ltd and 10% by Marubeni Oil & Gas (UK) Ltd. Latterly owned 95% by Perenco UK Ltd and 5% by Marubeni.

=== Topaz ===
The field began operations in November 2009. It was run by RWE Dea. Named after the topaz mineral of aluminium.

=== Kelvin ===
Operated by ConocoPhillips and used the Caister-Murdoch system. Discovered in September 2005 with production starting in November 2007. Owned 50% by ConocoPhillips (UK) Ltd, 27% by GDF Suez E & P UK Ltd, and 22% by Tullow Oil SK Ltd. The Kelvin platform has the field designation Kelvin TM. Named after William Thomson, 1st Baron Kelvin.

=== Rita ===
Operated by E.ON Ruhrgas UK North Sea Ltd. Production began in March 2009 and discovered in May 1996. Owned 74% by E.ON Ruhrgas UK Caister Ltd and 26% by GDF Suez E & P UK Ltd. Comprised a subsea wellhead RH, gas was transported via the Hunter field (HK).

=== Jupiter area ===
These fields were Ganymede ZD (discovered June 1989 with production starting October 1995), Sinope (discovered January 1991 with production starting October 1999), Callisto ZM (discovered February 1990 with production starting October 1995), Europa EZ (discovered September 1972 with production starting October 1999) and NW Bell ZX (discovered in 1994 and production began in August 1999). They used the LOGGS pipeline via Ganymede ZD, being operated by ConocoPhillips. It is named after the moons of Jupiter. They were owned 20% by ConocoPhillips, 30% by Statoil and 50% by Superior Oil Company (latterly owned by Esso).

=== Saturn area ===
These fields were Saturn (discovered December 1987 with production starting in September 2005), Mimas MN (discovered in May 1989 with production starting in June 2007), Hyperion, Atlas, Rhea (all three operating as one from September 2005 and discovered in January 1991) and Tethys TN (discovered in February 1991 with production starting in February 2007). The platforms had the field designations Saturn ND, Mimas MN and Tethys TN. They used the LOGGS pipeline. The fields were named after the moons of Saturn. Owned by ConocoPhillips, RWE Dea AG, and by Venture North Sea Gas Ltd. Operated by ConocoPhillips.

=== V fields ===
These fields are Vulcan (discovered April 1983 with production starting October 1988), South Valiant & North Valiant (discovered in July 1970 and January 1971 with production starting for both in October 1988), Vanguard (discovered December 1982 with production starting October 1988), Victor JD (discovered May 1972, production started September 1984, ceased 2015), Vampire OD (discovered in January 1994, production started October 1999, ceased 2016), Viscount VD (production ceased 2015) and Valkyrie OD. They use the LOGGS pipeline via the Viking platform. It is mostly jointly owned by ConocoPhillips and BP (former Britoil). Named after aircraft - the Avro Vulcan, Vickers Valiant, Handley Page Victor, Vickers Viscount, XB-70 Valkyrie, and de Havilland Vampire. The V field project was officially opened by Margaret Thatcher on 1 September 1988, when she visited the terminal. In the LOGGS system, the accommodation platform is separate from the production platform. The V-field comprised the following installations: North Valliant 1 PD (bridge-linked to LOGGS), North Valliant 2 SP, South Valiant TD, Vanguard QD, Victor JD and subsea Victor JM, Vulcan RD and UR, Vanguard QD, Vampire/Valkyrie OD and Viscount VD. Vulcan UR installation will be removed in 2018–19, Vampire OD and Viscount VO installations will be removed in 2020.

=== Juliet ===
Juliet was discovered by GDF SUEZ in block 47/14b in December 2008. This field was operated by GDF SUEZ and production started beginning of January 2014, with the west well. Production at the east well started during first quarter 2014. The production was sent via pipeline to the Pickerill A platform (see above), and from there to the Theddlethorpe Gas Terminal.

=== Clipper South ===
RWE Dea UK, which has a 50% equity share in the gas field, is the owner. Fairfield Energy and Bayern Gas each hold 25% equity in the project. Developed in 2012 as a single platform designated RL producing to the LOGGS installation. In November 2018 the export of fluids was rerouted to the Clipper complex and thence to Bacton.

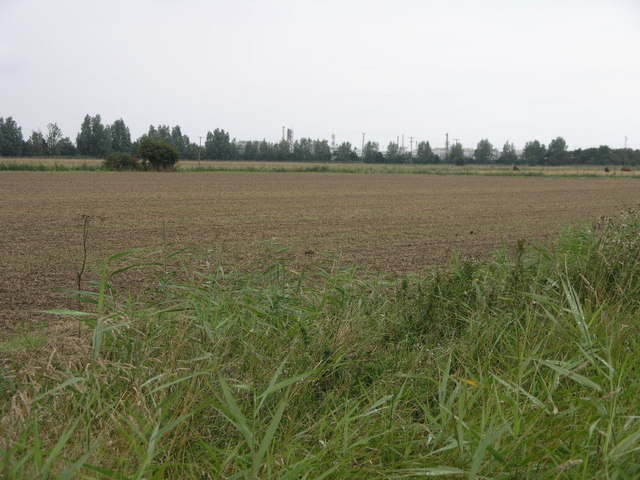
Seen from the south

== Decommissioning ==
Following the end of production the Viking, LOGGS, Pickerill and CMS pipelines were flushed, cleaned and filled with seawater. The onshore lines from the Theddlethorpe terminal – the 30-inch and 36-inch lines to the National Grid terminal, the 30-inch Killingholme line, the 6-inch Humber oil refinery line, and the Saltfleetby gas pipeline – were purged, flushed and disconnected from the terminal. All the plant at the terminal was emptied, purged and flushed. This work constitutes the first phase of decommissioning. In 2019 Chrysaor assumed the ownership of Conoco-Phillips North Sea Assets. Chrysaor were granted planning permission to demolish Theddlethorpe gas terminal by Lincolnshire County Council in January 2020. The third and fourth phases will be the remediation followed by restoration of the site back to agricultural land, this is expected to be complete by 2022. In March 2021 Chrysaor Holdings merged with Premier Oil to form Harbour Energy. In July 2021 Look North reported that the Radioactive Waste Management (RWM) a Government Agency was in early discussions with Lincolnshire County Council regarding a proposal to store spent nuclear material at the site. However, Harbour Energy plan to utilise the site and some of the spent offshore gas fields for carbon capture and storage.

== See also ==
- Easington Gas Terminal
- Bacton Gas Terminal
- CATS Terminal
- Rampside Gas Terminal
- St Fergus Gas Terminal
- List of oil and gas fields of the North Sea
- Offshore installation identification
- Lincolnshire Offshore Gas Gathering System
- Viking gas field
- Caister Murdoch System gas fields
- Pickerill and Juliet gas fields
