= Caister Murdoch System gas fields =

UK gas field in the North Sea

Caister Murdoch System
- Country: United Kingdom
- Region: North Sea
- Location/blocks: 43/19, 44/17, 44/18, 44/19, 44/21, 44/23, 44/26, 44/28, 49/1
- Offshore/onshore: Offshore
- Coordinates: 54.268717N 2.323767E
- Owner: Conoco & Total originally

Field history
- Discovery: From 1968
- Start of production: 1993
- Abandonment: 2018

Production
- Producing formations: Triassic sands and Carboniferous

The Caister Murdoch System (CMS) was a major natural gas collection, processing and transportation system in the UK sector of the southern North Sea. It comprised 11 platforms, 8 subsea wellhead completions and interconnecting pipelines centered about 155 km east of Flamborough Head Yorkshire. It operated from 1993 to 2018.

== Background ==
The Caister Murdoch System (CMS) was originally conceived by Conoco (U.K.) Ltd. and Total Oil Marine plc to develop the Murdock and Caister gas fields. Caister had been discovered by Total in Block 44/23 in January 1968 in Triassic Bunter Sands. However, its remote location near the UK / Netherlands median line meant there was no infrastructure to support the export of gas. The Caister Carboniferous gas field was discovered by Total in Block 44/23 in February 1985 and the Murdoch Carboniferous field by Conoco in Block 44/22 in August 1985. The discovery by Shell Oil of the Schooner Carboniferous gas field in Block 44/26 in December 1986 made the development of CMS viable.

The hub of the CMS was the Murdoch installation which initially comprised just the Murdoch MD platform. The Caister platform, installed in 1993, was an unmanned satellite. Production from MD began in October 1993 and was through the 188 km 26” pipeline to the Theddlethorpe gas terminal (TGT) in Lincolnshire. Conoco's Boulton field (1997) and Shell's Schooner and Ketch platforms were tied into the Murdoch system in 1996 and 1999 respectively. As wellhead pressures declined a compression platform Murdoch MC and an accommodation platform Murdoch MA were bridge linked to Murdoch MD. Other fields were tied in from 2000 to 2012.

== List ==
The locations, properties and late-life (2017) operatorship of gas fields tied into CMS were as follows.

CMS Fields
Field and installation	Block	Coordinates	Water depth, metres	Discovered	Initial licensee	Operator (2017)
Boulton BM	44/21a	54.243611 2.320833	42	1984	Conoco	ConocoPhillips
Boulton HM	44/21	54.189297 2.210781	36		ConocoPhillips	ConocoPhillips
Caister CM	44/23a	54.2.3809 2.451269	41	January 1968; February 1995	Total	ConocoPhillips
Cavendish RM	43/19a	54.478744 1.740211	18	1989	Britoil	Ineos
Hawksley EM	44/17a	54.559028 2.491753	17	2002	Conoco	ConocoPhillips
Hunter HK	44/23a	54.308500 2.420167	34	1992, 2005	Caledonia	Premier
Katy KT	44/19b	54.403758 2.660611	26	2012	ConocoPhillips	ConocoPhillips
Kelvin TM	44/18b	54.336577 2.258694	32	2005	ConocoPhillips	ConocoPhillips
Ketch KA	44/28b	54.049417 2.488350	51	1984	Shell	Faroe Petroleum (UK)
McAdam MM	44/17	54.346472 2.357472	32	2001	Conoco, Tullow	ConocoPhillips
Munro MH	44/17b	54.434625 2.300146	27	2004	Tullow	ConocoPhillips
Murdoch K KM	44/22a	54.238186 2.389775	38		Tullow	ConocoPhillips
Murdoch MD	44/22	54.268717 2.323767	32	August 1985	Conoco	ConocoPhillips
Murdoch MC	44/22	54.268611 2.323889	32	–	–	ConocoPhillips
Murdoch MA	44/22a	54.164250 2.191839	30	–	–	ConocoPhillips
Rita	44/22c	54.277023 2.210656	35	1996	E.ON Ruhrgas UK	Premier
Schooner SA	44/26a	54.099033 2.076383	73	December 1986	Shell	Faroe Petroleum (UK)
Topaz	49/1a	53.955167 2.827306	34	2009	RWE Dea	Ineos
Watt QM	44/22		41	2001	Conoco	ConocoPhillips

=== Names ===
The names of gas fields in the area are derived from several themes.

- 18th and 19th century scientists, engineers and inventors: Matthew Boulton; Henry Cavendish; Thomas Hawksley; Hunter; Lord Kelvin; John McAdam; Munro; William Murdoch; James Watt.
- Sailing vessels: Ketch; Schooner.
- A Norfolk castle: Caister.
- Personal names: Katy, Rita.
- Gemstone: Topaz (cf. Amethyst gas field).

== Developments ==
The gas fields were developed through an array of platforms and subsea facilities. These were as shown in the following table, together with data on the peak rate and cumulative production of gas in million cubic metres (mcm).

CMS developments and production
Installation	Structure	Start-up	Production to	Pipeline length and diameter	Peak production, mcm/y	Year of peak	Cumulative production to 2014, mcm
Boulton BM	Steel jacket	1997	Murdoch MD	11 km, 10”	925	1998	7,185
Boulton HM	Subsea	2002	Watt QM		140	2004	357
Caister CM	Steel jacket	1993	Murdoch MD	11 km, 16”	388 (Bunter)	1995	3,202
Caister CM	Steel jacket	1993	Murdoch MD	11 km, 16”	745 (Carboniferous)	1995	5,156
Cavendish RM	Steel jacket	2006	Murdoch MD via Cavendish manifold	47.2 km, 10”	649	2008	2,480
Hawksley EM	Subsea	2002	Murdoch MD via manifold	22 km, 12”	610	2003	1,464
Hunter HK	Subsea	2006	Murdoch K KM	6.2 km, 8”	24	2008	41
Katy KT	Steel 3-legs	2012	Kelvin TM–Murdock MD pipeline	14 km, 10”	200	2013	200
Kelvin TM	Steel 3-legs	2007	Murdoch MD via manifold	12.5 km, 12”	457	2008	738
Ketch KA	Steel jacket	1999	Murdoch MD	28 km, 18”	1,233	2000	6,407
McAdam MM	Subsea	2003	Hawksley–Murdoch pipeline		926	2006	3,691
Munro MH	Steel 3-legs	2005	Hawksley EM	5 km, 10”	354	2006	1,379
Murdoch K KM	Subsea	2002	Murdoch MD via manifold	5.5 km, 10”	1,378	2003	5,682
Murdoch MD	Steel jacket	1993	Theddlethorpe	188 km, 26”	1,063	1994	13,606
Murdoch MC	Steel jacket	1993	Murdoch MD	–	–	–	–
Murdoch MA	Steel jacket	1993	–	–	–	–	–
Rita	Subsea	2009	Hunter HK	14 km, 8”	506	2010	1,086
Schooner SA	Steel jacket	1996	Murdoch MD	30 km, 16”	1,245	1997	8,659
Topaz	Subsea	2009	Schooner SA	15.5 km, 6”	94	2010	198
Watt QM	Subsea	2003	Murdoch MD via manifold	17 km, 10”	16	2004	16

In addition to the gas pipelines there was also a methanol distribution system. Methanol/corrosion inhibitor was pumped from TGT through a 4-inch pipeline to Murdoch MD. From here it was distributed to the platforms and wellheads through 3-inch and 2-inch pipelines.

New pipeline reception facilities and process plant was installed at TGT as part of the CMS development.

=== Production ===
Production profile, in mcm/y, of the Murdoch field

=== Gas compression ===
Wellhead gas from the individual fields was routed to either the Suction, the Interstage or the Discharge Manifold on Murdoch MC depending on its pressure. Gas from the Suction Manifold was routed to the Suction Slug Catcher where liquids were removed. Gas flowed successively to the LP Suction Scrubber, the First Stage Gas Compressor and the Intercooler. Here it was comingled with gas from the Interstage Manifold which had flowed through the Interstage Slug Catcher. The combined flow was routed to the Interstage Scrubber, the Second Stage Gas Compressor and the Export Gas Cooler. Gas was returned to the MD platform and to the Theddlethorpe trunk line. Recovered liquids were injected into the trunk line.

To increase the compression capacity a compressor module was added to the Murdoch MC platform in 2003.

=== Telecommunications ===
Murdoch MD was connected to the Tampnet (formerly NorSea Com-1) submarine telecommunications cable system. It has landing points at Lowestoft, Suffolk, UK and Kårstø, Rogaland, Norway. It is connected to:

1. Draupner platform, operated by Gassco

2. Ula oil field, operated by BP

3. Ekofisk, operated by ConocoPhillips

4. Valhall oil field, operated by BP

5. Murdoch gas field, operated by ConocoPhillips (now disconnected)

== Decommissioning ==
Some CMS fields were shut-in in the 2010s when they became uneconomic to operate. Production from the CMS ceased with the shutdown of the Theddlethorpe gas terminal in August 2018. The platforms and subsea wellhead structures are being removed.

== See also ==
- Theddlethorpe Gas Terminal
- List of oil and gas fields of the North Sea
- Lincolnshire Offshore Gas Gathering System
- Pickerill and Juliet gas fields
- Viking gas field
