= Rosebank oil and gas field =

Oil and gas field west of Shetland, Scotland

- Location within North Sea
- Country: United Kingdom
- Region: Scottish Territorial Waters
- Location: West of Shetland
- Offshore/onshore: offshore
- Operator: Equinor
- Partners: Equinor; Suncor Energy; Siccar Point Energy

Field history
- Discovery: 2004

Production
- Producing formations: Paleocene sandstone

The Rosebank oil and gas field lies west of Shetland, Scotland. It is operated by Equinor, Suncor and Siccar Point Energy. The discovery well was drilled in 2004. A final investment decision for Rosebank was planned to be taken by May 2022. In 2022, Siccar Point Energy was acquired by Ithaca Energy, a daughter company of Delek Group.

Ocean depth is 1,100 metres (3,600 ft). The discovery well, drilled to 2,743 m (8,999 ft), flowed 6,000 barrels per day (950 m^{3}/d) of 37° API light oil from a deposit 24 m (79 ft) thick.

== Exploration and appraisal ==
Licence P.1026 covering blocks 213/26 and 213/27 was awarded to Texaco North Sea UK Co in the 19th UK offshore licensing round on 1 June 2001. The work program included a commitment to reprocess 3D seismic and to reach a decision on a 'drill or drop' well commitment within three years. In October 2001, Texaco was merged with Chevron who farmed-down its share of the licence to 40% prior to the discovery well, 213/27-1Z, being drilled in 2004. At the time of discovery the other licence owners were Statoil (30%), OMV (20%) and DONG (10%). Shortly after the discovery the four companies were granted an additional licence (P.1191) on adjacent block 205/1.

Several changes in ownership of the licence have taken place resulting in the current ownership of Equinor 40% (and operator of the licence), Suncor (40%) and Siccar Point (20%). Statoil had sold its 30% stake of the licence to OMV in 2013 prior to Equinor acquiring Chevron's 40% stake in 2019. Statoil was renamed Equinor in 2018. The licences currently cover blocks 213/26b, 213/27a and 205/1a.

A three-well appraisal started in October 2006 and the second well in the sequence, 205/1-1, was flowed tested at a rate of 6,000 barrels/day of good quality oil.

In oil and gas exploration it is common practice for prospects and discoveries to be named according to a theme. Texaco named the Rosebank prospect after the Scottish malt whisky Rosebank. Texaco also named other prospects in the Atlantic Margin in keeping with the theme including Lagavulin, Talisker and Lochnagar. Other naming themes in use by various operators include sea birds (Shell), Scottish mountains (BP), castles, rivers, Scottish dances and famous geologists (Conoco).

== Geology ==
The deposit is contained in layers of Tertiary period, Palaeocene Colsay sandstone which lie between layers of basalt making use of seismic imaging difficult and expensive. It is estimated that 240 million barrels (38×10^{6} m^{3}) of oil and gas could be recovered. A deeper Cretaceous period accumulation was also encountered in some of the wells, and this was named Lochnagar.

== Practical considerations ==
Weather conditions are extremely difficult. The superstructure is designed to withstand 100-foot (30 m) waves. High petroleum prices and favourable tax treatment is needed. Bringing gas to market requires finding a way to finance a pipeline which would combine production from several fields in the West of Shetland area into a gas export pipeline. Equinor selected FPSO Petrojarl Knarr for the development. The ship was constructed in 2014 for BG Norge.

== Environmental implications ==
Rosebank is the biggest undeveloped oil field in UK Territorial waters, and could extract a projected 500 million barrels of oil equivalent over its lifetime. That makes it almost triple the size of the controversial nearby Cambo oil field, which drew widespread protests and opposition in 2021 and was eventually paused.

== Opposition to Rosebank ==
Fears about the environmental damage that could be caused by developing the Rosebank field, and about its impact on the UK's ability to meet net-zero greenhouse gas emissions commitments, have led to widespread opposition to the project. In February 2023, a number of public figures (including comedian Frankie Boyle, campaigner Vanessa Nakate), and institutions (RSPB, the Women's Institute) wrote to British Prime Minister Rishi Sunak, urging him to reject plans for the Rosebank field. In March, 700 scientists, including some of the UK's leading climate experts, wrote to Sunak asking him to halt all new oil and gas developments.

There has also been significant political opposition to the Rosebank field. In March 2023, the former leader of the opposition and shadow energy secretary Ed Miliband publicly opposed the field and said that the government were ignoring the science by refusing to do the same. In April, Chris Skidmore, Conservative MP and chair of the government's net-zero review 'Mission Zero', wrote an op-ed in The Guardian against the development of the Rosebank field. Skidmore argued that the project would undermine net-zero targets and that it would disproportionately benefit the Norwegian economy at the UK's expense. The Scottish Greens have also campaigned for the government to reject the development plans, and in a Westminster Hall debate in June 2023, Green Party MP Caroline Lucas said that approval of Rosebank would have 'disastrous' environmental consequences. In their 2023 report to parliament, the UK government's independent advisers on climate change, the Climate Change Committee (CCC), suggested that the government's support for expanding fossil fuel production in the UK has resulted in the UK no longer holding a global leadership position on climate action. This was reaffirmed by comments from the CCC's Chair, Lord Deben. Deben, also a Conservative Party member of the House of Lords, claimed that Rosebank discredits previous UK government statements at international climate conventions, where it has urged developing nations to cut emissions.

Activist groups have also staged several actions against the Rosebank project. In May, activists protested and spoke onstage at Equinor's AGM in Oslo. In June, groups and activists across the UK staged demonstrations in cities and on coastlines, including in the Shetland islands, located close to Rosebank, and in London, Edinburgh, Aberdeen, Grimsby, and Cornwall. Campaigners have shown that the likely emissions from extracting the oil from Rosebank would see the oil and gas industry fail to meet its emissions reduction targets, which make up part of the UK's legally binding domestic Carbon Budgets. The project attracted further controversy when it was reported that Equinor was considering 'decarbonising' the project by electrifying the FPSO using the UK's Viking Wind Farm. Analysts calculated that the wind farm could otherwise be powering hundreds of thousands of homes.

In November 2024, Greenpeace and Uplift filed a legal challenge at the Court of Session in Edinburgh against the approval of the Rosebank oil field. The organizations argued that the UK Government and the North Sea Transition Authority (NSTA) had acted unlawfully in granting consent for the projects. Their case asserted that the environmental impact assessments conducted for the developments failed to consider downstream emissions resulting from the combustion of the extracted fossil fuels. In January 2025, a court has ruled that the approval granted for two new Scottish oil and gas fields was unlawful, requiring their operators to seek fresh authorization from the UK government before production can commence. The ruling, concerning the Rosebank and Jackdaw fields, was issued by the Court of Session in Edinburgh. In his judgment, the judge determined that a more comprehensive environmental assessment was necessary, specifically considering the climate impact of burning any fossil fuels extracted from the fields. While operations on both fields may continue during the reassessment process, no oil or gas can be extracted until new approval is obtained. In August 2026, 211 artists signed a letter calling for prime minister Andy Burnham to reject plans for further drilling.

== External links and further reading ==
- Map showing location of the field
- UK offshore oil and gas – Energy and Climate Change Contents: 4, West of Shetland
