= Cambo oil field =

Prospective oil field in the North Sea

- Location within Scotland
- Country: Scotland, United Kingdom
- Region: North Sea
- Block: 204/4a 204/5a 204/9a 204/10a
- Offshore/onshore: Offshore
- Coordinates: 60°48′N 4°07′W
- Partners: Ithaca Energy (70%); Shell (30%)

Field history
- Discovery: 2002
- Start of development: 2022 (original projection)
- Start of production: 2025 (original projection)
- Abandonment: 2021

Cambo oil field is a prospective oil and gas field in the North Atlantic, 125 kilometres (78 mi) north west of the Shetland Islands, United Kingdom. The field is in a deep section of water, some 3,440–3,610 feet (1,050–1,100 m) below sea level. Development of the field has led to criticism from green campaign groups stating it goes against the United Kingdom's reduction in carbon emissions. The project has the potential to deliver millions of barrels of oil and over 53 billion cubic feet (1.5×10^{9} m^{3}) of gas.

== Development ==
The Cambo oil field was discovered in 2002, and is 30 kilometres (19 mi) south west of the Rosebank field, and 50 kilometres (31 mi) north of the Schiehallion field. It was named after the village of Cambo in Northumberland, England. It lies 125 kilometres (78 mi) north west of the Shetland Islands in the Faroe-Shetland Basin, some 1,050–1,100 metres (3,440–3,610 ft) below the sea level. Originally identified by Hess, the site was acquired (along with many other West of Shetland licences) by OMV in 2014, later becoming part of the Siccar Point Energy portfolio.

Siccar Point Energy developed the project and test drilling in 2018 confirmed a substantial oil reservoir, estimating at least 600 million barrels of oil. As a result, Shell took a 30% stake in the project, with Siccar Point Energy retaining the remaining 70%.

In the original projected timeline, development drilling was to have started in 2022, with the start of production in 2025. An estimate of production rates suggested that the field could produce 50,000 barrels of oil per day. The field has the potential to deliver a 25-year project yielding 170 million barrels of oil and 53 billion cubic feet (1.5×10^{9} m^{3}) of gas.

== Geology ==
The oil lies in a sandstone laid down in the Eocene era, of the Hildasay Member, part of the Flett Formation. The reserve is estimated to contain over 800 million barrels of oil. The field sits below a geological structure known as the Corona Ridge. The reserves were deposited in the early Eocene when the North Atlantic bed was subjected to rifting. This process has been estimated to have taken place for a period of some 200,000 years.

== Objections ==
The proposed development of the site led to criticism from environmental groups, not only for the carbon emissions, but also for the marine damage that a pipeline would cause. The Environmental Law Alliance Worldwide stated that the Faroe-Shetland sponge belt, which is a marine protected area, could be at risk. The first minister of Scotland, Nicola Sturgeon, stated in November 2021 that she believed the project should not go ahead, prompting criticism from the former head of communications for the Scottish National Party (SNP), David Mutch. He said "Stop Cambo doesn't get us very far. In fact, it gets us unemployment and more imported oil for decades.....I think it is disappointing, I'm not sure it makes a lot of sense and it is also at odds with what the First Minister was saying just last week at the COP26 conference in Glasgow." The announcement also caused a backlash from members of her own party (SNP) who represented the areas which had a high proportion of jobs in the oil and gas sector. However, the Scottish Green Party welcomed the decision from the first minister, with their spokesperson Mark Fuskell stating "She is absolutely right that expanding oil and gas is folly during the pressing climate crisis." The Scottish section of Friends of The Earth said: "We welcome the First Minister's acknowledgement that there is no credible climate test that the Cambo oil field could ever pass. This is an important progression of the Scottish Government's position, which must now translate into clear opposition to all new fossil fuel projects."

== Abandonment and reinstatement ==
In December 2021, development of the oil field was "paused" by Siccar Point Energy, after Shell withdrew from the venture. In the run-up to the COP 26 environmental summit, accusations by various campaign groups were levelled against the UK and Scottish governments of them being hypocritical over allowing the project to go ahead, whilst maintaining the need to reduce carbon emissions. In March 2022, Siccar Point Energy applied to extend the licences for the project, which were due to expire at the end of March 2022, whilst Shell were re-considering the project, just three months after abandoning it. Although not confirmed by Shell directly, the Russian invasion of Ukraine, which saw restrictions on oil and gas supplies from Russia, prompted renewed thinking regarding projects such as Cambo oil field. In April 2022, Siccar Point Energy was bought out by Ithaca Energy.
