= Pickerill and Juliet gas fields =

Decommissioned gas fields

- Country: United Kingdom
- Region: North Sea
- Blocks: Pickerill: 48/11a, 48/11b, 48/12c and 48/17b; Juliet: 47/14b.
- Offshore/onshore: Offshore
- Coordinates: 53°33′0″N 01°04′38″E
- Operators: Pickerill: ARCO, Perenco; Juliet: Neptune E&P Ltd

Field history
- Discovery: Pickerill: December 1984
- Start of production: Pickerill: 1992; Juliet: 2014
- Abandonment: 2018

Production
- Estimated gas in place: 16.2×10^{9} m^{3} (570×10^{9} cu ft)
- Producing formations: Rotliegend sandstone

The Pickerill and Juliet gas fields are decommissioned natural gas producing facilities in the UK sector of the southern North Sea. The fields are located about 66 km (41 mi) east of Spurn Head, Lincolnshire. Pickerill was in operation from 1992 until 2018 and Juliet from 2014 to 2018.

== The fields ==
The Pickerill field was discovered in December 1984 by well 48/11b-4. The field is principally located in Block 48/11a and 48/11b and extends into Blocks 48/12c and 48/17b. The gas reservoir is a Rotliegend sandstone. At the time of start-up, the field was jointly owned by ARCO British Ltd (43.34%), British Sun Oil Co Ltd (23.33%), Superior Oil (UK) Ltd (20.00%), Deminex UK Oil & Gas Ltd (10.00%), and Canadian Superior Oil (UK) Ltd (3.33%). The field was anticipated to have recoverable reserves of 16.2 billion cubic metres.

The Juliet gas field is located to the west of Pickerill in Block 47/14b. It was owned by Neptune E&P Ltd.

== Development ==
The Pickerill field was developed by ARCO by two unattended offshore installations Pickerill A and Pickerill B, with gas transmitted by pipeline from Pickerill A to Theddlethorpe Gas Terminal (TGT), Lincolnshire. The main design parameters of the installations is shown in the table.

Pickerill installations
Platform	Pickerill A	Pickerill B
Block	48/11b	48/11a
Coordinates	53°33’00”N 01°04’38”E	53°31’30”N 01°09’38”E
Water depth, metres	24	24
Type	Steel jacket	Steel jacket
Jacket weight, tonnes	500	500
Topsides weight, tonnes	1,200	1,200
Legs, piles	4, 4 internal	4, 4 internal
Well slots	9	9
Production to	Theddlethorpe	Pickerill A
Gas export pipeline number	PL816	PL818
Pipeline length and diameter	62 km 24”	16”
Methanol 3" import pipeline number	PL818	PL819
Telecoms tower height, metres	65	65

Gas treatment facilities on the installations were minimal. Normally gas from the wellheads was routed to the production manifold and then to the export line. There was a Test Separator with metering of the individual gas, condensate and water streams. There was a wet well separator for removing water from well fluids. There was also a pig launcher on each platform and a pig receiver on Pickerill A for the Pickerill B to A pipeline.

New pipeline reception facilities and process plant was installed at TGT as part of the Pickerill development.

Perenco assumed ownership of the Pickerill field in 2004.

The Juliet development comprised two subsea wells and their wellhead protection structures (WHPS) producing to a manifold centre.

Juliet installations
Installation	Coordinates	Water depth, metres	Owner
Juliet East WHPS	53.599522 0.808094	55	Neptune
Juliet Manifold	53.601897 0.802000	60	Neptune
Juliet West WHPS	53.599467 0.80507	60	Engie

From the manifold well fluids flowed to Pickerill A via a 22 km long 12” diameter pipeline (PL3121). Reception facilities (the Juliet emergency shutdown valve and a temporary pig receiver) at Pickerill A were located on a sub-cellar deck. Fluids were routed to the export line to TGT. Juliet was controlled from Pickerill A via a control umbilical.

Pickerill A and B were both unmanned and controlled from the Bacton Control Room.

=== Production ===
Production profile, in mcm/y, of the Pickerill field

The cumulative gas production from Pickerill from 1992 to the end of 2014 was 12,315 million cubic metres.

== Decommissioning ==
The Theddlethorpe Gas Terminal closed in August 2018. Gas export from Pickerill and Juliet ceased and the installations were shut-down. Subsequently their wells were plugged and abandoned and all structures above the seabed were removed.

== See also ==
- Theddlethorpe Gas Terminal
- List of oil and gas fields of the North Sea
- Caister Murdoch System gas fields
- Lincolnshire Offshore Gas Gathering System
- Viking gas field
- Bacton Gas Terminal
