= Theddlethorpe St Helen =

Village in Lincolnshire, England

Coordinates: 53.377399°N 0.214610°E

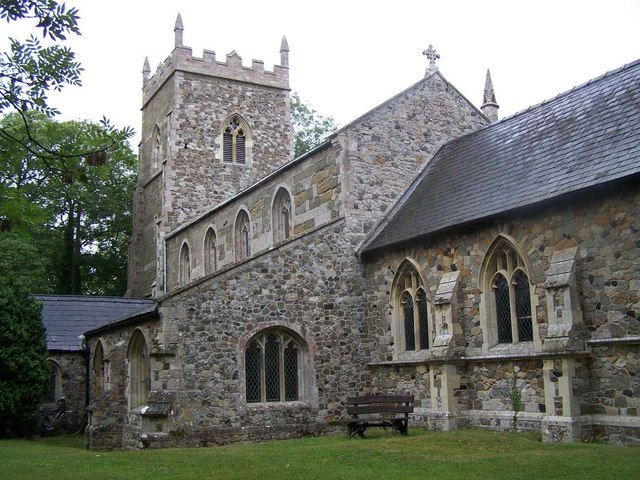
- St Helen's Church

- Location within Lincolnshire
- Area: 9.31 km^{2} (3.59 sq mi)
- Population: 525 (2011 census)
  - Density: 56/km^{2} (150/sq mi)
- OS grid reference: TF474890
  - London: 135 mi (217 km) S
- District: East Lindsey
- Shire county: Lincolnshire
- Region: East Midlands
- Country: England
- Sovereign state: United Kingdom
- Post town: MABLETHORPE
- Postcode district: LN12
- Dialling code: 01507
- Police: Lincolnshire
- Fire: Lincolnshire
- Ambulance: East Midlands
- UK Parliament: Louth and Horncastle
- Website: http://parishes.lincolnshire.gov.uk/Theddlethorpe/

Theddlethorpe St Helen or East Theddlethorpe is a village and civil parish in the East Lindsey district of the county of Lincolnshire, England. It lies about 3 miles (5 km) north of Mablethorpe on the North Sea coast. Part of the seashore belongs to Saltfleetby-Theddlethorpe Dunes National Nature Reserve, consisting of sea dunes and saltwater and freshwater marshes. It is one of five UK locations where the natterjack toad is found. In 2011 the parish had a population of 525. The parish touches Gayton le Marsh, Mablethorpe and Sutton, Theddlethorpe All Saints and Withern with Stain. Theddlethorpe St Helen shares a parish council with Theddlethorpe All Saints.

The Theddlethorpe Gas Terminal processed natural gas from the North Sea until it closed in 2018.

== History ==
In the Domesday Book of 1086, Theddlethorpe appears as Tedlagestorp, believed to mean "outlying farmstead or hamlet of a man called Theodlac".

This village and parish are in Louth district, 9 miles (14 km) east of Louth itself. It had a population according to the 2001 census of 595, falling to 525 at the 2011 census.

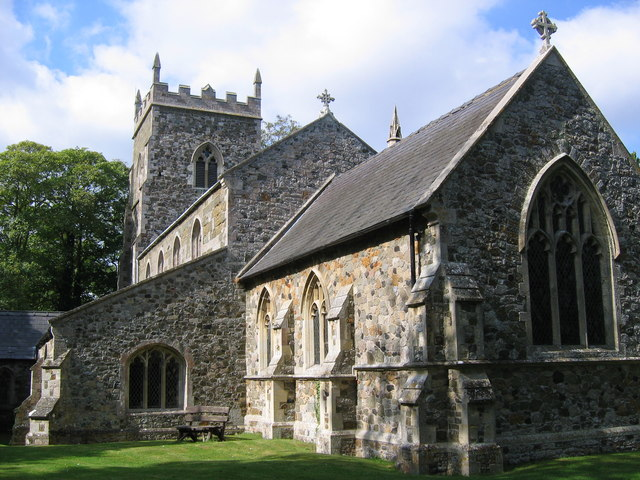
Another view of St Helen's Church

The parish church is a Grade II* listed building dedicated to St Helen, dating from the 14th–15th centuries. The chancel and aisles were rebuilt by Samuel Sanders Teulon in 1866. The church is of greenstone and limestone, with a 15th-century tower, a 14th-century font, and a 19th/20th-century interior.

== Landmarks ==
There are four listed buildings in Theddlethorpe St Helen. Theddlethorpe St Helen has a church called St Helen's.

Theddlethorpe Hall is a Grade II listed red-brick country house from the late 17th century, with early 18th and 19th-century alterations. The Stable Block is also Grade II listed and dates from the 19th century.

== Education ==
Theddlethorpe St Helen has a primary school.

=== Former station ===
Theddlethorpe railway station was on the Louth and East Coast Railway. It opened in 1877 and closed in 1960.

Population of Theddlethorpe St Helens Civil Parish
Year	1801	1811	1821	1831	1841	1851	1881	1891	1901	1911	1921	1931	1951	1961	2001	2011
Population	220	207	239	275	347	360	414	349	311	281	319	261	312	308	495	525
