= Cleeton gas field and hub =

Natural gas facility in the North Sea

Cleeton gas field
- Country: United Kingdom
- Region: southern North Sea
- Location/blocks: 42/29
- Offshore/onshore: Offshore
- Coordinates: 54.03337N 0.757814E
- Operators: BP, Perenco
- Owner: BP, Perenco

Field history
- Discovery: April 1983
- Start of production: 1988

Production
- Estimated gas in place: 280×10^{9} cu ft (7.9×10^{9} m^{3})
- Producing formations: Permian sandstone

The Cleeton gas field and hub is a natural gas production, gathering, compression, treatment and transportation facility in the southern North Sea, 54 km east of Flamborough Head, Yorkshire. It has been producing and transmitting gas since 1988.

== The Cleeton gas field ==
The Cleeton gas field, in UK Block 42/29, was discovered in April 1983. Cleeton was one of the 'Villages' gas fields; named after villages lost to the sea along the Holderness coast. These villages include: Cleeton, Dimlington, Hoton, Hyde, Newsham and Ravenspurn.

The reservoir is a Permian Lower Leman Sandstone Formation, estimated to have gas reserves of 280 billion cubic feet. The reservoir was produced from wells drilled from the Cleeton Wellhead tower, CW. From CW gas, and associated condensate, flowed to the bridge-linked main platform, CPQ. Here it was treated in 3-phase separators, gas dehydration, condensate coalescers and produced water treatment plant. As wellhead pressures declined so gas was compressed on the compression platform, CC, installed in 1995. Treated gas and condensate was sent to Dimlington gas terminal via the 36-inch pipeline.

Production profile, in million cubic metres per year (mcm/y), of the Cleeton field

The Cleeton field was shut down as unproductive in 1999. The cumulative total of gas produced since 1988 was 10,268 mcm.

== Other developments ==
In addition to the Cleeton offshore facilities a new gas terminal was built at Dimlington to receive and treat the gas prior to shipment into the National Transmission System.

The Ravenspurn gas field was being developed and from 1989 gas was routed to Cleeton for treatment, if required, and to Dimlington via the 36-inch pipeline.

The Easington Catchment Area project was instigated in the late 1990s. A bridge-linked ECA riser tower (CT) was installed at Cleeton to receive gas from the ECA development. Gas was processed on Cleeton CPQ as required and was transmitted to Dimlington.

The Cleeton field was originally owned and operated by Britoil/BP, Perenco assumed ownership in 2012.

== Cleeton platforms ==
The Cleeton hub comprised the following bridge-linked platforms:

The Cleeton hub
Platform name	Cleeton Wellhead CW	Cleeton CPQ	Cleeton Compression CC	Cleeton ECA Riser CT
Installation type	Fixed steel platform	Fixed steel platform	Fixed steel platform	Fixed steel platform
Coordinates	54.033373N 0.727814E	54.033373N 0.727814E	54.033373N 0.727814E	54.033373N 0.727814E
Function	Wellheads	Risers, processing and accommodation	Compression	Risers and processing
Year commissioned	1987	1988	1995	1999
Water depth, metres	50	50	50	50
Substructure weight, tonnes	1,020	3,100	1,140	
Topsides weight, tonnes	1,090	6,600	640	714
No. of legs	4	8	4	
No. of Wells		–	–	–

== Cleeton pipelines ==
The following pipelines were connected to the Cleeton hub.

Cleeton pipelines
From	To	Fluid	Diameter, inches	Length, km	Pipeline Number
Ravenspurn South	Cleeton CPQ	Gas	16	20.689	PL448
Ravenspurn North	Cleeton CPQ	Gas	24	25.51	PL669
Cleeton CPQ	Dimlington	Gas	36	58.14	PL447
Whittle	Cleeton CT	Gas	12	14.88	PL1928
Neptune	Cleeton CT	Gas	16	6.91	PL1684
Minerva	Cleeton CT	Gas	16	13.20	PL1934
Cleeton CT	Whittle	Hydraulic fluid	145 mm	15.05	PLU1930
Cleeton CT	Minerva	Hydraulic fluid	146 mm	13.03	PLU1939

== See also ==
- Easington gas terminal
- Arthurian gas fields
- Planets gas fields
- Ravenspurn gas fields
- Easington Catchment Area
- List of oil and gas fields of the North Sea
