= Anglia gas field =

UK natural gas field in the North Sea

- Location within North Sea
- Country: United Kingdom
- Location: Southern North Sea
- Blocks: 48/18b, 48/19b, 48/19e
- Offshore/onshore: offshore
- Coordinates: 53.33333°N 1.58333°E
- Operator: Ithaca Energy
- Partners: Ithaca Energy (30%); First Oil (32.8%); Dana Petroleum 25% DEA AG (12.2%)

Field history
- Discovery: February 1972
- Start of production: 1991
- Abandonment: November 2015

Production
- Estimated gas in place: 235×10^{9} cu ft (6.7×10^{9} m^{3})

The Anglia gas field, is a natural gas field in the United Kingdom's continental shelf of the Southern North Sea. It is located in blocks 48/18 and 48/19 about 60 km (37 mi) east of the Lincolnshire coast. The reservoir is located at a depth of approximately 8,500 feet (2,600 m) subsea. The field was discovered in February 1972. Detailed seismic and appraisal well work were conducted in 1984. The reservoir was estimated to have 235 billion cubic feet of gas in place.

== Owners ==
The original partners were Ranger Oil (operator, 35.628%), Conoco (31.25%), Elf Oil and Gas (16.46%), Amerada Hess (12.83%), and Triton Resources (3.832%). In December 2010, Ithaca Energy became operator of the Anglia field by acquiring 30% stake in the field from GDF Suez E&P UK. Other partners are First Oil (32.8%), Dana Petroleum 25%, and DEA AG (12.2%).

== Development ==
The field, at a cost of $120 million, was initially developed in 1991 through the Anglia A Normally Unattended Installation (NUI). The NUI had five producing wells including, at that time, the longest horizontal well drilled in British waters: the A3Z well has a 3,568 ft horizontal section. Production was through a 12-inch diameter pipeline to the Conoco (later ConocoPhillips) operated LOGGS (Lincolnshire Offshore Gas Gathering System) complex and thence to Theddlethorpe gas terminal. In 1993 the field was further development through the Anglia YM subsea template, with fluids produced via an 8-inch pipeline to Anglia A.

The design parameters of the Anglia production facilities are summarised in the table.

Anglia installations design parameters
Installation	Anglia A (YD)	Anglia West B (YM)
Block	48/18b, 48/19b	48/18b
Coordinates	53° 22.057’N 1° 39.100’E	53⁰ 22.322’N 10° 34.752’E
Installation type	Fixed steel platform	Subsea wellheads
Installed	1991	1993
Water depth, metres	22.5	31
Substructure weight, tonnes	1,008	
Topsides weight, tonnes	870	–
No. of legs	3	–
No. of Wells	6	2
Gas export to	LOGGS PP	Anglia A
Export pipeline length, diameter	23.7 km, 12-inch	4.9 km, 8-inch
Pipeline number (gas)	PL854	PL954
Methanol import from	LOGGS PP	Anglia A
Methanol pipeline length, diameter	23.7 km, 3-inch	4.9 km, 6-inch
Pipeline number (methanol)	PL855	PL955

Fluids from the individual wells were routed to the Production Manifold. From the manifold fluid flowed to a Demister which removed solids and liquids, the gas passed directly to export. Water, sand and condensate from the Demister passed to the 2-phase Inlet Separator with sand routed to the Sand Accumulator which was periodically dumped to a caisson. The liquids from the Sand Accumulator were routed to a Hydrocyclone. Separated condensate was combined with the gas stream and flowed to export. Water from the hydrocyclone flowed to a Degasser and was discharged overboard. Anglia was also provided with a 3-phase Test Separator where individual wells could be tested.

A summary of the key gas production data for the Anglia field is shown on the table.

Anglia field gas production
Field	Anglia
Start of production	1991
Peak flow, million cubic metres/y	547
Year of peak flow	1992
Cumulative production to end of 2014, million cubic metres	5,703
Production ceased	2016

Gas production profile, in mcm/y, for the Anglia field

In November 2015 Ithaca Energy announced that production from Anglia would cease. In August 2018 all production through LOGGS and the Theddlethorpe gas terminal ceased.
