= Ithaca Energy =

British oil and gas company

Ithaca Energy plc
- Type: Public
- Traded as: LSE: ITH; FTSE 100 component
- Industry: Energy
- Founded: 2004
- Headquarters: Aberdeen, Scotland
- Key people: Yaniv Friedman (Chairman); Iain Lewis (Interim CEO)
- Revenue: ▲$2,900.2 million (2025)
- Operating income: ▲$1,095.1 million (2025)
- Net income: ▼$(84.1) million (2025)
- Parent: Delek Group
- Website: investors.ithacaenergy.com

Ithaca Energy plc is a British oil and gas company operating in the North Sea. Headquartered in Aberdeen, Scotland, it is listed on the London Stock Exchange, is a constituent of the FTSE 100 Index and is a subsidiary of the Israeli-owned Delek Group.

== History ==
Ithaca Energy was originally founded in Canada in 2004. It shifted its focus to the North Sea and grew through acquisitions and organic development and moved to the UK when it took over operations in the Beatrice oil field in 2008. (Note: Talisman Energy resumed ownership of the field in 2015 in preparation for decommissioning the field.)

In December 2010, Ithaca Energy became operator of the Anglia gas field by acquiring 30% stake in the field from GDF Suez E&P UK. (Note: Ithaca Energy ceased production in the Anglia gas field in 2015.)

It traded on the Alternative Investment Market until it was acquired by an Israeli-based company, Delek Group, in 2017.

The company acquired Siccar Point Energy for $1.5 billion, giving it stakes in the Rosebank oil and gas field and the Cambo oil field, in July 2022.

The company was the subject of an initial public offering on the London Stock Exchange in November 2022.

Delek Group still retains in excess of 75% ownership and voting rights.

== Operations ==
Ithaca Energy's core business is the exploration, development, and production of hydrocarbons in the UK Continental Shelf. Its portfolio comprises a mix of operated and non-operated assets, spread across the Northern and Central North Sea, as well as West of Shetland. The company's asset base includes interests in several key fields, such as the Greater Stella Area.

The company has a 20% stake in the non-operating Rosebank oil and gas field and 70% stake in the operating Cambo oil field.

== Controversy ==
Ithaca has been subject to environmental protests in response to their opening of the Cambo oil field and their plans to develop the Rosebank oil field in September 2023.

Ithaca was the subject of protests for its connection with Israeli settlements in March 2018. Ithaca is a subsidiary of Delek, a company which the UN reported as supplying services and utilities supporting the maintenance and existence of Israeli settlements in Palestine.

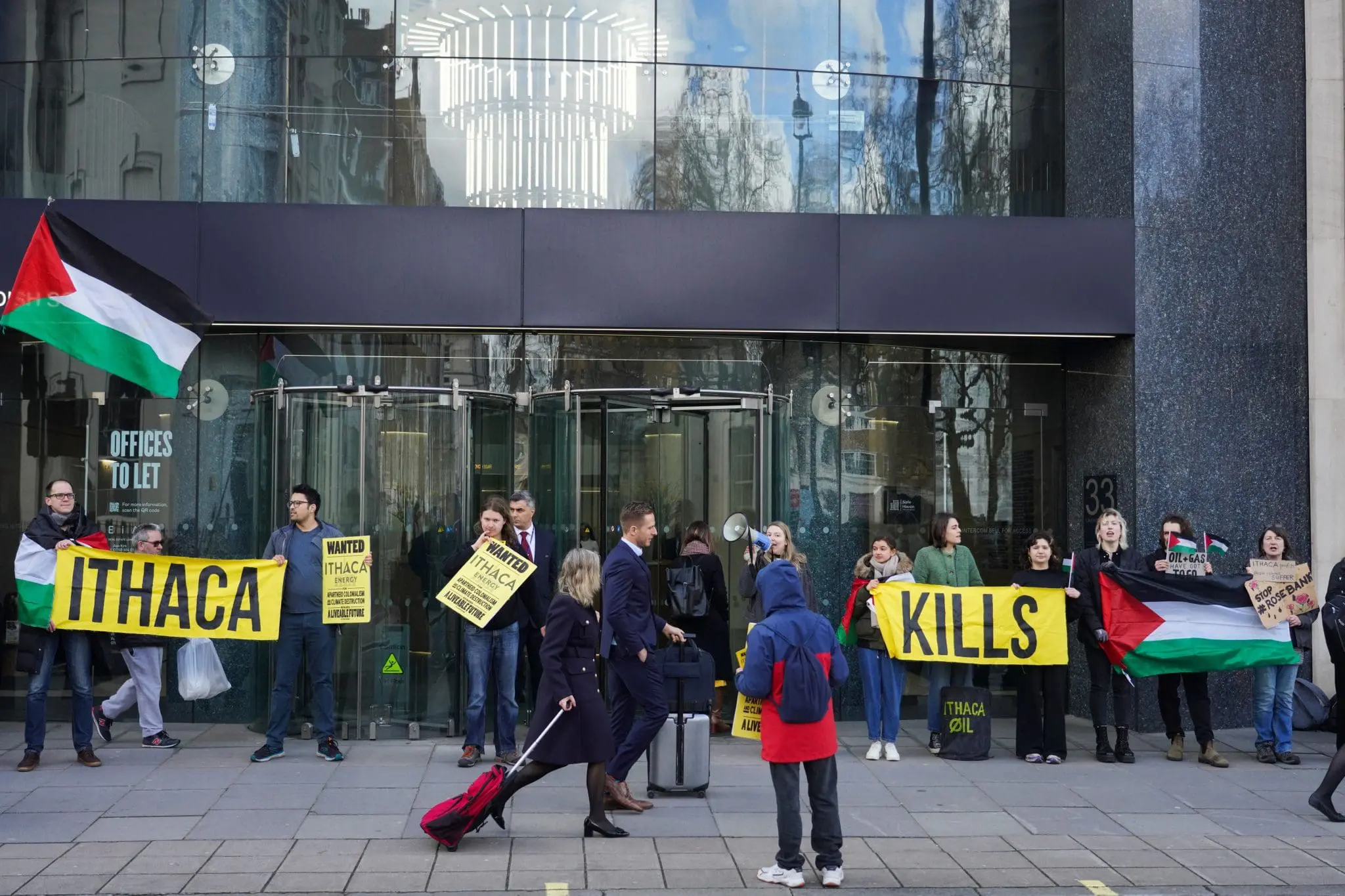
A Fossil Free London protest against Ithaca
