= Easington Catchment Area =

Group of natural gas fields in the North Sea

Coordinates: 53.704°N 0.593°E

The Easington Catchment Area (known as ECA) is a group of natural gas producing fields in the Southern North Sea. They lie in UK Blocks 42 and 47 between 25 and 30 miles (40 and 48 km) east of the Yorkshire and Lincolnshire coast. The fields are operated by Perenco.

== Development ==
The Easington Catchment Area project was developed in two phases. The £150 million first phase involved development of the Mercury (Block 47/9b) and Neptune (Blocks 47/4b and 47/5a) gas fields which had been discovered in 1983 and 1985 respectively. The ECA partners were, for the Neptune field: BG Exploration and Production Limited (61%), BP (18%), and Amerada Hess (21%); and for the Mercury Field: BG Exploration and Production Limited (73%) and Amerada Hess (27%).

The Neptune field was developed using three new wells, an existing well and a new NUI (normally unattended installation). The Mercury field was developed with a subsea installation with well fluids produced to the Neptune NUI via a 10-inch diameter pipeline. The Neptune platform consists of a 630 tonne jacket supporting a 681 tonne deck. From the Neptune platform co-mingled fluids are transported to a dedicated riser tower on the Cleeton installation via a 16-inch diameter pipeline. The gas is separated, dried and metered on Cleeton before transmission into the BP Cleeton/Dimlington pipeline system. A contract for the pipelines and subsea facilities, valued at around £23m, was awarded to ETPM UK. Methanol for hydrate formation inhibition is piped from Cleeton to the Neptune platform. First gas was produced in 1999.

Details of the first phase installations are summarised in the table.

Easington Catchment Area phase 1 developments
Installation	Neptune	Mercury
Block	47/4b	47/9b
Coordinates	53°28’59”N 0°46’59”E	53°46’00”N 0°37’59”E
Reservoir	Rotliegendes sandstone	Rotliegendes sandstone
Discovered	1985	1983
Gas in place, million cubic feet	465	
Type	Fixed steel platform	Subsea wellhead
Water depth, metres	47	30
Substructure weight, tonnes	630	64
Topsides weight, tonnes	681	–
Wells	4	1
Export to	Cleeton	Neptune
Export line length, diameter	6.91 km, 16-inch	26.5 km, 10-inch
Start of production	1999	1999
Peak flow, million cubic metres/y	2,007	627
Year of peak flow	2001	2001
Cumulative production to end of 2014, mcm	10,978	3,069

Production profile, in mcm/y, of the Neptune field

=== Second phase ===
The £270 million second phase of the ECA project, known as Juno, included the development of the Apollo (Block 47/4a), Artemis (Block 47/3), Minerva (Block 47/3), Whittle (Block 42/28b) and Wollaston (Block 42/28) gas fields. The majority stakeholder for the Juno fields was the BG Group.

The Minerva hub facilities consist of subsea production systems on Apollo and Artemis and a normally unattended installation (NUI) at Minerva. The Apollo subsea wells are tied back via a manifold and pipeline to the Minerva platform. The Artemis appraisal well is also tied back via a separate pipeline to the Minerva platform. Produced fluids from all three fields are co-mingled on the Minerva platform, and the combined flow exported via a 16-inch diameter pipeline to the BG-operated ECA riser tower bridge-linked to the Cleeton complex. The Wollaston and Whittle fields are developed via subsea wells and flowlines tied back via a manifold and a 12-inch diameter pipeline to the ECA riser tower, where they are co-mingled with the Minerva hub fluids. The first gas from the second phase was produced in 2003.

Apollo and Artemis are named from the Greek deities, Minerva from the Roman Deity, Whittle from Frank Whittle the inventor of the turbojet engine, and Wollaston from the Scientist William Hyde Wollaston. The second phase JUNO installations are summarised in the table.

Easington Catchment Area phase 2 JUNO developments
Installation	Apollo	Artemis	Minerva	Whittle	Wollaston
Block	47/3b	47/3	42/28b	42/28b	42/28a
Coordinates	53.90000 0.550000	53.916667 0.550000	53.950147 0.594915	54.110306 0.542964	54.114944 0.842167
Reservoir	Permian sandstone	Permian sandstone	Permian sandstone	Permian sandstone	Permian Carboniferous
Discovered	July 1987	August 1974	January 1969	July 1990	April 1989
Gas in place, billion cubic feet	300				
Type	Subsea	Subsea	Fixed steel	Subsea	Subsea
Water depth, metres	40	40	40	53	53
Wells	2		4	1	1
Substructure weight, tonnes			790	120	120
Topsides weight, tonnes			847	–	–
Export to	Minerva		Cleeton	Cleeton	Whittle
Export line length, diameter	6.34 km, 8-inch		13.28 km, 12-inch	14.88 km, 12-inch	5.46 km, 12-inch
Start of production	2003		2003	2003	2003
Peak flow, million cubic metres/y	392		577	481	
Year of peak flow	2004		2003	2004	
Cumulative production to end of 2014, mcm	2,740		3,601	2,642	

Production profile, in mcm/y, of the Apollo field

In 2009 BP acquired BG Group's share of the Juno fields. In 2012 BP sold its interests in the ECA fields and installations to Perenco.

== See also ==
- Easington Gas Terminal
- Planets gas fields
- List of oil and gas fields of the North Sea
- Cleeton gas field and hub
