= Planets gas fields =

UK gas fields in the North Sea

- Country: United Kingdom
- Region: North Sea
- Location/blocks: 47, 48 & 49
- Offshore/onshore: Offshore
- Operators: see table

Field history
- Discovery: From 1972
- Start of production: 1995
- Peak of production: see table

Production
- Producing formations: Rotligend sandstone

The Planets gas fields are small natural gas producing areas in the UK sector of the southern North Sea, their names are associated with the planets and moons of the Solar System. The fields started gas production from 1995, although some have now (2021) ceased operation.

== The fields ==
The Planets fields are in Quadrants 47, 48 and 49 and have been owned and operated by a range of successive organisations. The fields are named after planets, minor planets, moons and asteroids. The planetary fields reservoir parameters are as shown.

The Planets fields reservoir parameters
Field	Block	Coordinates	Gas reservoir	Gas reserves (billion cubic feet (bcf))	Discovered	Licensee(s), Operator(s)
Atlas (part of Saturn)	48/10	–	Rotliegendes sandstone			Conoco, ConocoPhillips, Chrysaor, Harbour Energy
Callisto (part of Jupiter)	49/22	53.242478 2.387881	Rotliegendes sandstone		1990	Conoco, ConocoPhillips, Chrysaor, Harbour Energy
Callisto North	49/22					
Ceres (formerly Barbarossa)	47/9c	53.779844 0.715501	Rotliegendes sandstone		1982	Centrica, Venture, Spirit Energy
Eris (formerly Channon)	47/8c	53.779844 0.569834	Rotliegendes sandstone			Centrica, Venture, Spirit Energy
Europa (part of Jupiter)	49/22	53.247869 2.297147	Rotliegendes sandstone			Conoco, ConocoPhillips, Chrysaor, Harbour Energy
Ganymede (part of Jupiter)	49/22	53.324767 2.238108	Rotliegendes sandstone		1972	Conoco, ConocoPhillips, Chrysaor, Harbour Energy
Hyperion (part of Saturn)	48/10	–	Rotliegendes sandstone			Conoco, ConocoPhillips, Chrysaor, Harbour Energy
Jupiter (Callisto, Europa, Ganymede and Sinope)	–	–	–			
Mercury	47/9b	53.766667 0.633333	Rotliegendes sandstone	465 bcf (with Neptune)	1983	BG, Perenco
Mimas	48/09a	53.762931 1.706019			1989	Conoco, ConocoPhillips, Chrysaor, Harbour Energy
Minerva	47/3	53.950147 0.594915				Perenco
Neptune	47/4b	53.483333 0.783333	Rotliegendes sandstone	465 bcf (with Neptune)	1985	BG, Perenco
Rhea (part of Saturn)	48/10	–	Rotliegendes sandstone			Conoco, ConocoPhillips, Chrysaor, Harbour Energy
Saturn (Atlas, Hyperion, Rhea)	48/10a	53.800944 2.026389	Rotliegendes sandstone			Conoco, ConocoPhillips, Chrysaor, Harbour Energy
Sinope (part of Jupiter)	49/22					Conoco, ConocoPhillips, Chrysaor, Harbour Energy
Tethys	49/11b	53.659256 2.125656				Conoco, ConocoPhillips, Chrysaor, Harbour Energy

== Developments ==
The fields were developed with an array of platforms and subsea completions. Production from the fields was routed via existing infrastructure to the onshore Easington and the (now closed) Theddlethorpe gas terminals.

Field	Water depth, metres	Field installations	Export to	Export pipeline, length and diameter (inches)	Production started	Status
Atlas	–	See Saturn	–	–	–	–
Callisto	22	Subsea wellhead ZM	Ganymede ZD Platform	12”	1995	Ceased production 2016
Callisto North						
Ceres	29	Subsea wellhead	Mercury Platform	6”	2010	
Eris	41	Subsea wellhead	Mercury Platform	8”	2010	
Europa	35	Steel Platform EZ	Tee on ZM–Ganymede pipeline	12”	2000	Ceased production 2016
Ganymede	35	Steel Platform ZD	LOGGS PR Platform	20 km, 18”	1995	Ceased production 2016
Hyperion	–	See Saturn	–	–	–	–
Jupiter	–	–	–	–	–	–
Mercury	30	Subsea wellhead	Cleeton Platform	10”	1999	Part of Easington Catchment Area development
Mimas	27	Steel Platform MN	Saturn Platform	13.5 km, 10”	2006	
Minerva	40	Steel Platform	Cleeton Platform	12”	2003	
Neptune	47	Steel Platform	Cleeton Platform	16”	1999	Part of Easington Catchment Area development
Rhea	–	See Saturn	–	–	–	–
Saturn	26	Steel Platform ND	LOGGS PR Platform	43 km, 14”	2005	
Saturn (south part)	30	Subsea wellheads Annabel AB1 and AB2	Audrey A (WD) platform	17.8 km, 10"	2005	Decommissioned 2016
Sinope	35	Subsea wellhead	Tee between Europa EZ and PL1091		1998	Ceased production 2016
Tethys	32	Steel Platform TN	Saturn-LOGGS pipeline	3.7km, 10”	2006	Ceased production 2016

== Production ==
The peak and cumulative production of gas from the fields was as follows.

Peak and cumulative gas production
Field	Peak production, million cubic metres (mcm)/year	Peak year	Cumulative production to 2014, mcm
Atlas	–	–	–
Callisto	254	1996	1,377
Callisto North	–	–	–
Ceres	182	2014	218
Eris	380	2014	227
Europa	451	2001	2,132
Ganymede	1,708	1996	7,734
Hyperion	–	–	–
Jupiter	–	–	–
Mercury	627	2001	3,069
Mimas	217	2008	878
Minerva	577	2003	3,601
Neptune	2,007	2001	10,978
Rhea	–	–	–
Saturn	1,598	2007	8,653
Sinope	274	2000	372
Tethys	221	2007	483

Gas production profile from Neptune (in mcm)

== See also ==
- Easington Gas Terminal
- Theddlethorpe Gas Terminal
- List of oil and gas fields of the North Sea
- Lincolnshire Offshore Gas Gathering System
- Easington Catchment Area
- A-Fields natural gas fields
- Cleeton gas field and hub
