= Linda Cook (businesswoman) =

American businesswoman (born 1958)

Linda Zarda Cook (born June 4, 1958) is an American businesswoman, who is CEO of Harbour Energy since 2014. She was previously CEO of Shell Gas & Power, part of Royal Dutch Shell, in the Netherlands until 2009. Cook was named the 44th most powerful woman in the world by Forbes magazine in September 2007.

== Biography ==
Cook was raised in Shawnee, Kansas. She graduated from the University of Kansas in petroleum engineering in 1980.

She began her Shell career in 1980 as a reservoir engineer in the United States, advancing through the company to accept greater responsibilities in exploration and production with Shell U.S.A. Her first European assignment came in 1998, when she and her family moved to the Netherlands, where she led Shell International EP. She was CEO of the Gas & Power division from 2000 to 2003, then led Shell Canada for a year before returning to her previous post.

On May 26, 2009, Shell announced that Cook mutually agreed to step down after losing the race to become the company's next chief executive. Shortly following the announcement of her resignation was the news that her division, Gas and Power, would be absorbed into the new management structure being promoted by new chief executive Peter Voser. Shares in Shell fell 1.1 per cent or 18p to 1613p in morning trading. Cook had worked for Shell for 29 years. She lost out on a loyalty bonus of more than £800,000, but her severance pay came to about £5 million, a figure determined by standard company and legal guidelines.

Cook joined the board of directors of The Boeing Company in 2003. She held four board assignments over the course of her tenure, including chair of the finance committee. On February 10, 2015, it was announced that Cook would not seek reelection to the board, ending her term that April. Cook has also been on the boards of directors of KBR and Marathon Oil.

Cook has been CEO of Harbour Energy since it was established in July 2014. In March 2021, the company merged and absorbed Chrysaor Holdings and Premier Oil to become the largest oil and gas producer in the North Sea.
