= Harbour Energy =

Scottish oil and gas company

Harbour Energy plc
- Type: Public
- Traded as: LSE: HBR; FTSE 250 component
- Industry: Oil
- Founded: 2014; 12 years ago
- Headquarters: London, England
- Key people: R. Blair Thomas (chairman); Linda Cook (CEO)
- Revenue: ▲$10,091 million (2025)
- Operating income: ▲$3,490 million (2025)
- Net income: ▼$(182) million (2025)
- Number of employees: 5,000 (2025)
- Website: www.harbourenergy.com

Harbour Energy plc is an oil and gas company headquartered in London, England. It is listed on the London Stock Exchange and is a constituent of the FTSE 250 Index. The company operates assets across the UK, South America, Mexico, Norway and Africa.

== History ==
The company was established by the commodity trader, Noble Group, and the private-equity firm, EIG Global Energy Partners, in July 2014. The initial funding was US$150 million from Noble Group and $50 million from EIG Global Energy Partners. The company provided financial backing for Chrysaor Holdings to acquire assets valued at US$3.8bn from Royal Dutch Shell; the backing led to the company becoming the largest shareholder in Chrysaor Holdings.

In June 2020, the company announced the provision of backing to enable Chrysaor Holdings to acquire Premier Oil. In March 2021 the company merged Chrysaor Holdings and Premier Oil and absorbed both into Harbour Energy. It was announced that the merged business would be managed by Linda Cook, who had been CEO of Harbour Energy since it was established. The transaction also made Harbour Energy the UK's largest independent oil and gas business.

In 2023, the Indonesia oil and gas regulator SKK Migas approved the first plan of development for the Tuna offshore gas field, operated by Harbour Energy, with a total estimated investment of $3 billion.

In December 2023, Harbour acquired the German gas and oil production company Wintershall Dea for $11.2 billion. The transaction was completed in the fourth quarter of 2024. As part of the transaction, the previous owners of Wintershall Dea, BASF and LetterOne will receive shares (39.6 per cent and 14.9 per cent, respectively) in Harbour Energy as payment.

In December 2025, it was announced that Harbour would acquire the subsidiaries of Waldorf Energy Partners and Waldorf Production for approximately $170 million. The acquisition increases Harbour’s stake in the Catcher oil field to 90 per cent and adds a 29.5 per cent non-operated interest in the Kraken field in the North Sea, with completion expected in 2026.

The German energy company BASF reduced its shareholding to 15.96% on 22 October 2026.

== Major Projects ==
=== Viking Carbon Capture and Storage Project ===
The Viking Carbon Capture and Storage (CCS) project, spearheaded by Harbour Energy in partnership with BP (which holds a 40% stake), focuses on capturing and storing carbon dioxide emissions from key industrial sources in the North Sea's depleted gas fields. The project aims to store 20 to 30 million tonnes of CO_{2} annually by 2030. The process involves collecting, liquefying, and transporting CO_{2} from major emission sources, including the VPI power station and the Phillips 66 Humber Refinery. It is scheduled to commence operations by 2028.
