= Mathematics education in the United Kingdom =

Mathematics education in the United Kingdom is largely carried out at ages 5–16 at primary school and secondary school (though basic numeracy is taught at an earlier age). However voluntary Mathematics education in the UK takes place from 16 to 18, in sixth forms and other forms of further education. Whilst adults can study the subject at universities and higher education more widely. Mathematics education is not taught uniformly as exams and the syllabus vary across the countries of the United Kingdom, notably Scotland.

== History ==
The School Certificate was established in 1918, for education up to 16, with the Higher School Certificate for education up to 18; these were both established by the Secondary Schools Examinations Council (SSEC), which had been established in 1917.

=== 1950s ===
The Association of Teachers of Mathematics was founded in 1950.

=== 1960s ===
The Joint Mathematical Council was formed in 1963 to improve the teaching of mathematics in UK schools. The Ministry of Education had been created in 1944, which then became the Department of Education and Science in 1964. The Schools Council was formed in 1964, which regulated the syllabus of exams in the UK, and existed until 1984. The exam body Mathematics in Education and Industry in Trowbridge was formed in 1963, formed by the Mathematical Association; and the first exam of Additional Mathematics was first set in 1965. The Institute of Mathematics and its Applications was formed in 1964, and is the UK's chartered body for mathematicians, being based in Essex.

Before calculators, many calculations would be done by hand with slide rules and log tables.

The Nuffield Mathematics Teaching Project started in September 1964, which lasted until 1971, to look at primary education, under Edith Biggs, from the Schools Inspectorate. The Nuffield Foundation Primary Mathematics Project began, with the 'Mathematics for the Majority Project' was for people up to 16 years old and was for slow learners.

The 1968 Dainton Report recommended that some sort of Maths education continued up to the age of 18.

=== 1970s ===
Decimal Day, on 15 February 1971, allowed less time on numerical calculations at school. The Metric system has curtailed lengthy calculations as well; the US, conversely, largely does not have the metric system.

At Ruskin College on Monday 18 October 1976 Labour Prime Minister Jim Callaghan made a radical speech decrying the lack of numeracy in school leavers, possibly prompted by the William Tyndale affair in 1975. The Prime Minister also questioned why so many girls gave up science before leaving secondary school.

But the Labour Party, instead, took curriculum change slowly, merely setting up the Committee of Inquiry into the Teaching of Mathematics in Schools, under Sir Wilfred Cockcroft, with Hilary Shuard and Elizabeth Williams. The subsequent report Mathematics Counts, was published in 1982; it offered few radical changes.

In March 1977 the government had a £3.9m scheme to recruit 1,200 more teachers. In England and Wales, there was a shortfall of 1,120 Maths teachers, 424 in physical sciences, and 525 in Design and Technology. It would be paid for by the Training Services Agency, and run by the Local Government Training Board. The scheme was open to people over 28, who had not attended a higher education course in the last five years.

=== 1980s ===
Electronic calculators began to be owned at school from the early 1980s, becoming widespread from the mid-1980s. Parents and teachers believed that calculators would diminish abilities of mental arithmetic. Scientific calculators came to the aid for those working out logarithms and trigonometric functions.

The BBC2 'Horizon' documentary Twice Five Plus the Wings of a Bird on Monday 28 April 1986, narrated by Peter Jones, looked at why people disliked abstract Maths, notably in the teenage years.

The Trends in International Mathematics and Science Study (TIMSS) showed that in some topics, the UK apparently had adequate Mathematics teaching, and from such reports Sir Keith Joseph merely implemented feasibility studies of national attainment standards, but the next education secretary, Kenneth Baker, Baron Baker of Dorking, wanted a lot more than mere feasibility studies. From hearing reports of national industrial failure being caused by insufficient mathematical abilities, he swiftly proposed a national curriculum in January 1987, to start in September 1988. Anita Straker and Hilary Shuard were part of the team that developed the primary national curriculum.

Since 1988, exams in Mathematics at age sixteen, except Scotland, have been provided by the GCSE.

=== 1990s ===
From the 1990s, mainly the late 1990s, computers became integrated into mathematics education at primary and secondary levels in the UK.

On Wednesday 18 November 1992 exam league tables were published for 108 local authorities, in England, under the Education Secretary John Patten, Baron Patten. The tables showed GCSE and A-levels for all 4,400 state secondary schools in England. Independent schools results were shown from 1993, and would include truancy rates. Left-wing parent groups, teachers' unions had opposed the move. Labour said it showed the government's simplistic approach to education standards, adding that raw results cannot reflect the real achievement of schools. The Liberal Democrats were not opposed, but thought that any information being provided was limited. Ofsted would be brought in the next year by Education Minister Emily Blatch, Baroness Blatch.

The specialist schools programme was introduced in the mid-1990s in England. Fifteen new City Technology Colleges (CTCs) from the early 1990s often focussed on Maths.

In 1996 the United Kingdom Mathematics Trust was formed to run the British Mathematical Olympiad, run by the British Mathematical Olympiad Subtrust. The United Kingdom Mathematics Trust summer school is held at The Queen's Foundation in Birmingham each year.

The National Numeracy Strategy, costing £60m, was devised by Anita Straker, for the government's Numeracy Task Force, for primary schools, for implementation in autumn 1999. Prof David Reynolds, of Newcastle University, was the chairman. He had appeared in a Panorama documentary on Maths education on 3 June 1996. The 60-page report in January 1998 recommended that children under the age of 8 should not have calculators.

The Millennium Mathematics Project was set up in 1999 at Cambridge by John D. Barrow, with 21 staff, with deputy director Julia Hawkins, now directed by Julia Gog.

=== 2000s ===
Mathematics and Computing Colleges were introduced in 2002 as part of the widened specialist schools programme; by 2007 there were 222 of these in England.

The Excellence in Cities report was launched in March 1999, which led to the Advanced Extension Award in 2002, replacing the S-level for the top 10% of A-level candidates. Since 2008, the AEA is only available for Maths, provided by Edexcel; the scheme was introduced when the A* grade was introduced; the scheme was provided until 2018.

In February 2004, the Smith Report, by the Principal of Queen Mary College, looked at how good exams were. People could pass at grade B at GCSE, but had taken much different type of exams. The report concluded that people could pass such exams, but lacked scant real-life proficiency at Maths.

A-level Maths entries dropped from 67,000 in 2000 to 53,000 in 2004.

The IGCSE, a more rigorous exam, was introduced in 2004, but the Labour government banned state secondary schools from being allowed to set the exam. It was viewed as 'elitist'.

In a 2006 House of Lords report on science education, the Lib Dem chair Baroness Sharp, took an interest in the reduced participation in Maths in schools; she had worked with the Science Policy Research Unit at the University of Sussex. The 2001 report by the Lords Science and Technology Committee led to the National Science Learning Centre (Science Learning Centres) at National STEM Centre, with the University of York in 2006, with a Maths centre at University of Southampton.

The National Centre for Excellence in the Teaching of Mathematics was founded 2006, after the Smith Report, being now in Sheffield.

The National Higher Education Science, Technology, Engineering and Mathematics (HE STEM) Programme was founded in August 2009 by HEFCE and HEFCW; the scheme had six regions across England and Wales, working with the universities of Bath, Birmingham, Bradford, Manchester Metropolitan, Southampton and Swansea; it was funded by £21m, and developed by the University of Birmingham STEM Education Centre; the scheme finished in July 2012. Also involved was the MSOR centre of the HEA (now Advance HE) Subject Centre, and the Centre for Excellence in University Wide Mathematics and Statistics Support at Loughborough University.

=== 2010s ===
The HEA subject centres closed in August 2011.

In September 2012 Prof Jeremy Hodgen, the chairman of the British Society for Research into Learning Mathematics, produced a report made by Durham University and KCL, where 7,000 children at secondary school took 1970s Maths exams. Maths exams results over the same time scale had doubled in grades, but the researchers did not find much improvement. Proficiency in routine Maths was better, but proficiency with difficult Maths was not as good.

Mathematics free schools were opened in 2014 - the King's College London Mathematics School in Lambeth, and Exeter Mathematics School in Devon; both were selective sixth form colleges; others opened at Liverpool and Lancaster; more selective sixth form maths schools are to open in Cambridge, Surrey, and Durham.

A newer curriculum for Maths GCSE (and English) was introduced in September 2015, with a new grading scale of 1–9.

In August 2015 the ACME claimed that there was a shortfall of 5,500 secondary school Maths teachers, in England. But this shortfall was hugely uneven. Comprehensive schools in wealthy areas or state grammar schools were not commonly short of Maths teachers, but secondary schools in less-salubrious places were often hideously short of Maths teachers.

=== 2020s ===
The Academy for the Mathematical Sciences was formed in Cambridge in 2025, funded by the Engineering and Physical Sciences Research Council.

== Nations ==
=== England ===
Mathematics education in England up to the age of 19 is provided in the National Curriculum by the Department for Education, which was established in 2010.

Early years education is called the Early Years Foundation Stage in England, which includes arithmetic. In England there are 24,300 schools, of which 3,400 are secondary.

The National Curriculum for mathematics aims to ensure that all pupils:

- become fluent in the fundamentals of mathematics, including through varied and frequent practice with increasingly complex problems over time, so that pupils develop conceptual understanding and the ability to recall and apply knowledge rapidly and accurately.
- reason mathematically by following a line of enquiry, conjecturing relationships and generalisations, and developing an argument, justification or proof using mathematical language.
- can solve problems by applying their mathematics to various routine and non-routine problems with increasing sophistication, including breaking down problems into a series of more straightforward steps and persevering in seeking solutions.

Mathematics is a related subject in which pupils must be able to move fluently between representations of mathematical ideas. It is essential to everyday life, critical to science, technology and engineering, an appreciation of the beauty and power of mathematics, and a sense of and necessary for financial literacy and most forms of employment. A high-quality mathematics education, therefore, provides a foundation for understanding the world, the ability to reason mathematically, and curiosity about the subject. Pupils should build connections across mathematical ideas to develop fluency, mathematical reasoning and competence in solving increasingly sophisticated problems. They should also apply their mathematical knowledge in science, geography, computing and other subjects.

=== Wales ===
Wales takes the GCSE and A-level in Mathematics, but has its own Department for Education and Skills. Wales does not produce school league tables. Wales has 1550 schools, of which 180 are secondary.

=== Scotland ===
Education Scotland, formed in 2011, regulates education at school in Scotland, with qualifications monitored by the Scottish Qualifications Authority (SQA) and the Mathematics syllabus follows the country's Curriculum for Excellence. Scotland does not produce school league tables. Scotland has 5,050 schools, of which 350 are secondary.

=== Northern Ireland ===
Northern Ireland is the only country in the UK to have exclusively selective schools - it has sixty nine grammar schools. Mathematics education is provided by the Department of Education (DENI), with further education provided by the Department for Employment and Learning. Northern Ireland has 1120 schools, of which 190 are secondary.

== Relation to other countries ==
In the 1980s the education researcher Sig Prais looked at mathematics education in Germany and the UK. He found that the teaching of mathematics of an appropriate level, in Germany, worked much better than to bludgeon all levels of mathematics onto all abilities in British comprehensive schools. In preparation for the new national curriculum in 1988, Sig Prais said 'There is an enormous burden on the teacher facing a mixed ability class. At age five, mixed ability classes are not such a problem. You can assume that nobody knows anything, but as the children process through the school, some will not have grasped all that they should, and they never catch up. In some countries, children are not allowed to move into the secondary schools until they are ready for it. They retake the lessons until they are.'

== Primary level ==
The Department of Education and Science set up an Assessment of Performance Unit in 1976 to monitor attainment of children at a national level, with standards of mathematics being monitored from 1978 by the National Foundation for Educational Research (NFER). Before this time, assessment of primary school standards had not been carried out at a national level.

Children at primary school are expected to know their times tables. Children are taught about long division, fractions, decimals, averages, ratios, negative numbers, and long multiplication.

== Secondary level ==
Study of Mathematics is compulsory up to the school leaving age in the UK. The Programme for International Student Assessment coordinated by the OECD currently ranks the knowledge and skills of British 15-year-olds in mathematics and science above OECD averages. In 2011, the Trends in International Mathematics and Science Study (TIMSS) rated 13–14-year-old pupils in England and Wales 10th in the world for maths and 9th for science.

=== GCSE mathematics ===
Typically studied by the vast majority of students in year 10 and year 11 (though in exceptional cases, can be taken earlier). GCSE is graded on a 1-9 scale, and students are able to choose between foundation tier (where the highest obtainable grade is 5), and higher tier (where grades up to 9 can be obtained).

Although the specifications vary between exam boards, the overarching topics studied in GCSE include number theory, algebra, ratio, proportion & rates of change; geometry & measures, probability, and statistics. Commonly assessed topics are quadratic equations, trigonometric functions and arithmetic sequences.

The three main exam boards in the UK require students to complete one paper with no calculator, as well as two more papers where students can use a calculator. It is expected that students have a scientific calculator in order to write out longer operations. The papers are usually sat at the end of year 11 in June, but they are also organised in November as some sixth form students re-sit.

Additional Mathematics GCSE can also be taken, which extends many of the topics found in regular GCSE maths, as well as introducing more advanced topics such as logarithms and calculus. It is considered good preparation for A-Level maths, with some schools requiring students to take Additional maths to continue their mathematical journey.

=== IGCSE mathematics ===
Similar to GCSE, IGCSE mathematics is mostly taken by 15-16 year olds at the end of a two-year study period. However, the style of question can differ slightly to appear more globally relevant. As well as this, some topics differ between the two, most notably IGCSE having slightly fewer statistics topics in favour of introducing more advanced pure maths topics such as differentiation and arithmetic series.

IGCSE maths is only set by Pearson Edexcel and CIE.

=== Mathematics teachers (why is this in this section?) ===
Qualifications vary by region; the East Midlands and London have the most degree-qualified Maths teachers and North East England the least. For England about 40% mostly have a maths degree and around 20% have a BSc degree with QTS or a BEd degree. Around 20% have a PGCE, and around 10% have no higher qualification than A level Maths.

For schools without sixth forms, only around 30% of Maths teachers have a degree, but for schools with sixth forms and sixth form colleges around 50% have a Maths degree.

There are around 27,500 Maths teachers in England, of whom around 21,000 are Maths specialists; there are around 31,000 science teachers in England.

== Sixth-form level ==
Due to a large increase in difficulty between GCSE and A-Level, it is widely recommended that students obtain at least grade 6 (with many institutions requiring grade 7) at GCSE in order to study A-Level maths.

At A-level, participation by gender is broadly mixed; about 60% of A-level entrants are male, and around 40% are female. Further Mathematics is an additional course available at A-level. A greater proportion of females take Further Maths (30%) than take Physics (15%), which at A-level is overwhelmingly a male subject.

From the UPMAP project (Understanding Participation rates in post-16 Mathematics and Physics) of the ESRC Targeted Initiative on Science and Mathematics Education (TISME), in conjunction with the Institute of Physics, it was found that uptake of Maths A-level was linked to the grade at GCSE. From 2012 figures, 79% with A*, 48% of A, 15% of B and 1% of grade C chose Maths in the 6th form. For English, History and Geography, 30% with grade B, and 10% with grade C chose the course in the 6th form.

The House of Lords July 2012 report Higher Education in STEM Subjects recommended that everyone study some type of Maths after 16. For less-able sixth formers, there was the AS level titled 'Use of Mathematics'.

Professor Robert Coe, Director of the Centre for Evaluation and Monitoring (CEM) at Durham University conducted research on grade inflation. By 2007, 25% of Maths A-level grades were an A; he found that an A grade A-level would have been a grade B in 1996 and a grade C in 1988. The Labour government wanted to expand higher education, so required 'proof' that academic standards at A-level appeared to be rising, or at least not falling, so requiring higher education to expand for this wider apparent academic achievement.

In 2014 Maths A-level became the most popular A-level, overtaking English Literature.

=== Core Maths ===
People not taking Maths A-level can take the Core Mathematics Level 3 Certificate, developed by Mathematics in Education and Industry in Wiltshire.

It was introduced by education minister Liz Truss from September 2015; her father was a university Maths lecturer. From 2014 it had been trialled in 170 schools. It was hoped that 200,000 sixth formers could study the course for three hours per week, but would possibly require 1,000 extra Maths teachers. 20% of sixth formers studied some kind of Mathematics in 2015.

The Advisory Committee on Mathematics Education wanted the Core Maths introduction. In August 2016, there were 3,000 entries for the first Core Maths Level 3 exam. Consequently, the Conservative government was looking at making Maths education up to 18 compulsory.

== University level ==
Admission to Mathematics at university in the UK will require three A-levels, often good A-levels (which is subjective), though that actually depends on the university, doesn't it. It is prevalently males who study Maths at university, and has been for decades.

There are around 42–43,000 Maths undergraduates at British universities, with around 27,000 being male and around 16–17,000 being female. Mathematics at university is also taught for other physical sciences and Engineering, but much fewer women than men are taught on these types of courses.

== Broadcasting ==
=== Television ===
Educational series on television have included

- Mathematics and Life, BBC TV 18 September 1961 on Mondays at 11am, repeated on Fridays at 2pm, presented by Hugh David, produced by Donald Grattan
- Pure Mathematics, BBC TV 17 September 1962 on Mondays and Wednesdays at 10am, repeated on Wednesday and Fridays at 9.30am, for the fifth form and sixth-form, presented by Norman Hyland, produced by Donald Grattan; repeated in September 1963
- Pure Mathematics Year II, BBC TV 16 September 1963 on Mondays and Wednesdays at 10am, for the age of 14, presented by Alan Tammadge (9 July 1921 - 25 February 2016, educated at Dulwich College and Emmanuel College, Cambridge); the series was the first of its kind on the BBC, to teach in such a formal way, known as 'chalk and talk'; the series was developed in response to an increasing lack of teachers for the sixth-form; in 1965, 38-year old Donald Grattan, a former grammar school Maths teacher, set up a new further education department at the BBC, with twenty producers; a new 'University of the Air' was being planned by Jennie Lee, Baroness Lee of Asheridge; in March 1968 through BBC Education, under Mr Grattan, this proposal turned largely into adult education courses, and from 1974 towards adult illiteracy; in July 1971 44-year-old Mr Grattan took over as Controller of Educational Broadcasting at the BBC, staying until July 1984; he died aged 93 on 21 August 2019.
- Middle School Mathematics, BBC TV 16 September 1963 on Mondays at 3pm, a 28-part series presented by Dikran Tahta, Alan Tammadge, the President of the Mathematical Association in 1978, David Morris, Stewart Gartside, Gerald Leach (4 January 1933 - 10 January 2004, the husband of child psychologist Penelope Leach), and Maurice Meredith, produced by Donald Grattan, and John Cain; repeated in September 1964, September 1965, September 1966.
- Modern Mathematics, BBC1 April 27 1964 on Mondays, repeated on Wednesdays at 9.30am, a 16-part series for 6th forms, for newer parts of the A-level Maths syllabus, directed by Edward Goldwyn and Norman Hyland, presented by J E Reeve, Tom Jones, Douglas Quadling and Geoffrey Matthews. Repeated in April 1965
- Mathematics '64, BBC2 on Tuesdays at 7.30pm a 20-part series presented by Alan Tammadge, Raymond Cuninghame-Green, Frank Yates, Stuart Hollingdale, Peter Coaker and Geoffrey Matthews, of 'Tuesday Term', with Wilfred Cockcroft, produced by David Roseveare
- Mathematics in Action: A Course in Statistics, BBC2 16 September 1965 on Thursdays at 7.30pm, repeated on BBC1 on Mondays at 9.30am and Thursdays at 12pm; a 12-part series presented by Stewart Gartside, Peter Sprent (a statistician and the husband of Janet Sprent and head of the Department of Mathematics at the University of Dundee in the late 1960s), and Bill Coleman, with Peter Armitage (statistician), produced by Edward Goldwyn; repeated September 1966, September 1967, September 1968, September 1969 and September 1970
- Mathematics in Action: Logic and the Computer, BBC2 13 January 1966 on Thursdays at 7.30pm, a ten-part series presented by Raymond Cuninghame-Green, Frank Lovis, Philip Woodward and Benedict Nixon, produced by Edward Goldwyn; repeated January 1967, January 1968, January 1969, January 1970 and January 1971
- Mathematics in Action: Mathematics Applied, BBC2 21 April 1966 on Thursdays at 7.30pm, presented by Prof John Crank, Kenneth Wigley, Noel Williams, Malcolm Bevan and Sydney Urry (originally from Highcliffe in Dorset, and taught Mechanical Engineering at Wandsworth Technical College, he later helped to set up Brunel University in 1966 and the sandwich course schemes, he had a heart attack aged 74 on 12 June 1999), produced by John Cain (attended Emanuel School and UCL) and Harry Levinson; repeated April 1967, April 1968, April 1969, April 1970, and April 1971
- Maths Today, BBC1 21 September 1967 on Thursdays at 10.30am with repeats on Fridays at 10am, Mondays at 10.30am, and Wednesdays at 11.30am, a two-year series for the first and second years at secondary school, with an associated fortnightly series of six programmes for teachers called 'Teaching Maths Today' from Monday 18 September 1967 with Don Mansfield; presented by David Sturgess, Derick Last and Brenda Briggs, the wife of Trevor Jack Cole, produced by John Cain and Peter Weiss; Year 2 was from 23 September 1968; both series were repeated each year until 26 June 1973; Mr Sturgess lived at 8 Cobthorne Drive in Allestree, in Derbyshire, and was a Maths lecturer at the University of Nottingham, previously the head of the Mathematics Department at Bishop Lonsdale College of Education in Mickleover; Derick Last appeared in the 1967 film 'Mathematics and the Village' about the Cambridgeshire school Cottenham Village College, where he was head of Maths from 1963, and attended Eye Grammar School and Loughborough College, who lived at Wickham Skeith and Ditchingham. There was a later radio series on Radio 3.
- Square Two, BBC2 14 January 1970 on Wednesdays at 7pm, repeated on Saturdays on BBC1 at 9.30am, a 30-part series for people who have left school, presented by Stewart Gartside, Bill Coleman and Alan Tammadge, produced by David Roseveare, written by Hilary Shuard, Douglas Quadling, Ronald Thompson, Leslie Williams and Albert Lawrance; repeated in January 1971
- Maths Workshop on BBC1 in the early 1970s with Jim Boucher and Michael Holt (author)
- Maths Topics, BBC1 17 September 1979 on Mondays at 10.30am, an O-level and CSE course, written by Ian Harris and Colin Banwell (of Bodmin School, and head boy of Sexey's Grammar School in Blackford, Somerset in 1953, who wrote 'Starting Points: For Teaching Mathematics in Middle and Secondary Schools' in 1972 with Ken Saunders ISBN 0906212510), produced by David Roseveare and Peter Bratt, repeated in September 1980, September 1981, September 1982, September 1983, September 1984, September 1985, September 1986, September 1987, and September 1988
- Maths Help, BBC1 10 January 1982 on Sundays at 12pm, repeated on Mondays at 2.30pm on BBC2, 12-part series for O-level, but was much more for primary-school level abilities than 16 year olds, presented by Laurie Buxton of ILEA, and partly by Norman Gowar of the Open University, produced by Robert Clamp (attended Coalville Grammar School, and taught Maths at Latymer Upper School); repeated in October 1982, with another series in January 1983, that was more O-level standard
- Using Mathematics, ITV and C4 1990 for secondary schools
- Mathsphere, BBC2 7 January 1991 on Mondays at 9.30am repeated on Thursdays at 11.30am, the course was designed for children 'who find Maths difficult' for ages 11-16, produced by David Roseveare and Kevin Newport
- The Statistics Collection, BBC2 26 April 1995, on Wednesdays at 9.30am, a short course for sixth formers
- Maths 4 Real, C4 2000, for secondary schools
- Maths Mansion C4 2001

=== Radio ===
- How Mathematicians Think, Third Programme 16 March 1950 on Thursdays at 7.30pm, with George Temple (mathematician) of KCL, Gerald James Whitrow of Imperial College, and Charles Coulson of KCL
- New Paths in Pure Mathematics, Third Programme 28 November 1950 on Wednesdays at 6.20pm, with parts
- 1 What Is a Curve?
- 2 Numbers and Axioms, with Max Newman, Professor of Mathematics at the University of Manchester
- 3 The Mathematics of Counting,
- 4 The Mathematics of Measuring, with Richard Rado of KCL
- 5 The Evolution of Geometrical Ideas, with John Greenlees Semple, Professor of Geometry at KCL
- Thinking in Numbers, Network Three 4 November 1959 on Wednesdays at 7.30pm, presented and written by statistician Maurice Kendall, with parts
- 1 Louis Rosenhead of the University of Liverpool, and Alexander Aitken of the University of Edinburgh
- 2 Staff of the National Physical Laboratory, and Reg Revans of the University of Manchester
- 3 Richard van der Riet Woolley, Michael Abercrombie of UCL, and Otto Robert Frisch of the University of Cambridge
- 4 Kenneth Mather
- Q.E.D., Third Programme 4 March 1962 on Sundays at 7pm, featured Nathan Isaacs of the National Froebel Foundation, Richard Skemp of the University of Manchester, Walter Warwick Sawyer of the Wesleyan University of Connecticut, Kenneth Austwick of the University of Sheffield, Felix Arscott of Battersea College of Technology and David Wheeler, an education lecturer at the University of Leicester. Repeated in September 1962
- Mathematics, part of For Schools, Home Service 6 May 1965 Thursdays at 9.30am, 10-part series presented by James Hawthorne; repeated in April 1966, April 1967, September 1967, and on Radio 4 in September 1968, and September 1969
- Developing Maths Today, Radio 3 9 October 1969 on Fridays at 7.30pm, it was a radio version of the BBC2 'Teaching Maths Today', produced by John Turtle

== Results by region in England ==
Of all A-level entrants at Key Stage 5, 23% take Maths A-level, with 16% of all female entrants and 30% of all male entrants; 4% of all entrants take Further Maths, with 2% of female entrants and 6% of male entrants. By number of A-level entries, 11.0% were Maths A-levels with 7.7% female and 15.0% male.

In England in 2016 there were 81,533 entries for Maths A-level, with 65,474 from the state sector; there were 14,848 entries for Further Maths with 10,376 from the state sector

Entries for Further Maths in 2016 by region -

- South East 2987
- East of England 1270
- North West 1111
- South West 1070
- West Midlands 868
- East Midlands 774
- Yorkshire and the Humber 749
- North East 414

== Results by LEA in England ==
Results shown are for 2016. In the 1980s, some areas with low Maths participation at A-level lost all sixth forms at the area's comprehensive schools, being replaced with stand-alone sixth form colleges, such as in Manchester and Portsmouth; this course of action may have helped in attracting qualified Maths teachers to those areas.

The supply of qualified (QTS in England and Wales) Maths teachers in the UK is largely a postcode lottery.

=== Lowest number of entries for Maths A-level ===
The north of England (except Lancashire) has a worse record for Mathematics entries at A-level than other regions.

- Knowsley 6
- Portsmouth 51
- Salford 66 (Manchester entered 647 as a comparison)
- Halton 70
- Middlesbrough 79
- South Tyneside 85
- Barnsley 96

=== Highest number of entries for Maths A-level ===
- Hampshire 2573
- Hertfordshire 2039
- Kent 1775
- Surrey 1668
- Essex 1499
- Lancashire 1492
- Birmingham 1403
- Buckinghamshire 1284
- Barnet 1189

Trafford entered 505, which is high for a small borough and almost the same number as Cumbria. Kirklees entered 661, which is more than Sheffield's 596; Kirklees is a much smaller borough by population than Sheffield.

=== Lowest number of entries for Further Maths A-level ===
- Knowsley 0 (Knowsley only entered 61 A-level exams in 2016)
- Sandwell 5
- Blackburn with Darwen 6
- Salford 7
- Portsmouth 8
- North East Lincolnshire 9
- Middlesbrough 11
- Stoke-on-Trent 15
- Barnsley 15
- Halton 16
- Southampton 16
- Torbay 16
- Bury 18
- Merton 18
- Rochdale 19

=== Highest number of entries for Further Maths A-level ===
Hampshire and Hertfordshire are the top two for Maths and Further Maths

- Hampshire 381
- Hertfordshire 370
- Kent 297
- Surrey 276
- Essex 260
- Buckinghamshire 244
- Lancashire 206

== See also ==
- Association of Teachers of Mathematics
- Education in the United Kingdom
- National Centre for Excellence in the Teaching of Mathematics
- Uses of trigonometry
