= Bisk =

Bisk can refer to:

- A traditional Yazidi ceremony involving the first haircut
- A misspelling of bisque (see bisque (disambiguation))
- A shopkeeper from Splatoon 2
