= NCSB =

NCSB may refer to:

- North Carolina State Bar
- National Centre for School Biotechnology
- Netherlands Consortium for Systems Biology
