= National Centre for Excellence in the Teaching of Mathematics =

National Centre for Excellence in Teaching Mathematics
- Abbreviation: NCETM
- Formation: 2006
- Legal status: Government agency
- Purpose: Maths education training
- Location: Sheffield, UK
- Coordinates: 53.373°N 1.47°W
- Region served: England
- Director: Charlie Stripp
- Affiliations: DfE
- Website: NCETM

The National Centre for Excellence in the Teaching of Mathematics (NCETM) is an institution set up in the wake of the Smith Report to improve mathematics teaching in England.

It provides strategic leadership for mathematics-specific CPD and aims to raise the professional status of all those engaged in the teaching of mathematics so that the mathematical potential of learners will be fully realised, and maths-specific professional development for teachers and teaching assistants in all phases from Early Years to post-16.

== Structure ==
Its director until March 2013 was Dame Celia Hoyles, Professor of Mathematics Education at the Institute of Education, University of London and former chief adviser on mathematics education for the government. She was succeeded by the current director, Charlie Stripp.

In its early years, the NCETM worked on the development of the MatheMaPedia project, intended to be a "maths teaching wiki". The project was initiated by John Mason, a professor of mathematics at Open University. As of 2025, the MatheMaPedia project seems to be inactive on the NCETM official website.

Initially headquartered in London, it is headquartered in the south of Sheffield city centre; it is the headquarters of Tribal Education.

It is run by Mathematics in Education and Industry (MEI) and Tribal Education.

=== Online discussions ===
Special online events have included the world’s first online discussion of proof.

== See also ==
- Centre for Industry Education Collaboration and National Centre for Computing Education, also at York
- Count On - maths education initiative
- Mathematics education in the United Kingdom
- International Congress on Mathematical Education
