= National Centre for Arts Education =

Government-funded arts education body in England

- Abbreviation: NCAE
- Formation: 30 September 2026; 43 days ago
- Type: Government-funded programme
- Purpose: Arts education in schools
- Region served: England
- Executive Director: Steven Berryman
- Key people: Gordon Carver (UK managing director, Etio)
- Parent organization: Department for Education (commissioning department)
- Affiliations: Birmingham City University; Chartered College of Teaching; Arts Council England
- Budget: £14.67 million (2026 to 2029, including VAT)
- Formerly called: National Centre for Arts and Music Education

The National Centre for Arts Education (NCAE) is a body funded by the Department for Education (DfE) to support the teaching of art and design, dance, drama and music in schools in England, announced in September 2026. The education consultancy Etio (Tribal Group PLC) runs it under a government contract, working with Birmingham City University and the Chartered College of Teaching. It began work on 30 September 2026 and is due to take over oversight of England's 43 Music Hubs from Arts Council England on 1 September 2027. The government first announced it in March 2025 as the National Centre for Arts and Music Education.

== History ==
The Labour Party's manifesto for the 2024 general election included a pledge to set up a National Music Education Network, which later became the plan for the centre. On 18 March 2025 the Education Secretary, Bridget Phillipson, announced a National Centre for Arts and Music Education on the same day that the Curriculum and Assessment Review, chaired by Becky Francis, published its interim report. The announcement said the centre would offer online training for teachers and help schools form partnerships with cultural organisations. The DfE said it would be in place by September 2026, with a delivery partner chosen through open procurement.

In June and July 2025 the Cultural Learning Alliance, a campaign group for arts education, held consultation workshops in Birmingham, Bradford, London and online, and sent the resulting framework to the DfE in August. Participants broadly agreed that "and Music" could be dropped from the title.

The DfE published the tender in February 2026. It set an estimated value of £13 million excluding VAT over three years, with an option to extend the contract to 2032. A decision had been expected by 19 June 2026, but the process was delayed. The DfE published its contract award notice on 14 September 2026, by which time the name had been shortened to National Centre for Arts Education. Four organisations bid for the contract, including a partnership led by the cultural education organisation Curious Minds.

== Structure and partners ==
Etio, formerly Tribal Education Services, is the government services arm of the education software company Tribal Group. It also runs the National Centre for Excellence in the Teaching of Mathematics for the DfE, which coordinates the Maths Hubs programme, and said the arts centre would follow similar principles. Birmingham City University, with its Royal Birmingham Conservatoire, is the lead research partner. The Chartered College of Teaching designs the quality assurance framework and certifies teachers who complete the centre's training. The DfE asked Arts Council England to help the centre build relationships across the cultural education sector and to manage the transfer of the Music Hubs.

Etio groups the centre's work under four headings: professional development for teachers, promotion of arts education, oversight of the Music Hubs network and national leadership, which includes coordinating philanthropic funding. It aims to work with more than 10,000 schools in areas where access to the arts is poor.

In September 2026 Tribal Group agreed to sell its businesses, including Etio, to the private equity firm Main Capital Partners, subject to shareholder approval.

== Leadership ==
Steven Berryman is the centre's executive director. He is a former music teacher and past president of the Chartered College of Teaching, and has been a visiting research fellow at King's College London.

Each art form has its own director: Jen Langeskov (art and design), Laura Nicholson (dance), Matt Yeoman (drama) and Louisa Roberts (music). Nicholson, previously interim chief executive of One Dance UK, joins in January 2027.

Moira Sinclair, former chief executive of the Paul Hamlyn Foundation, and Bridget Whyte, former chief executive of the music education body Music Mark, are among the centre's expert senior advisers. Jillian Barker, formerly director of learning and participation at the Royal Ballet and Opera, advises on cultural partnerships.

== Funding ==
Etio's winning bid was £12.225 million excluding VAT (£14.67 million including VAT) for the three years to August 2029. If the DfE takes up all three one-year extensions, the contract's maximum value is about £29 million including VAT, the figure reported by Tes. Music Hub grants sit outside the contract. At the time of the award, Music Hub revenue funding was £76 million a year. In a House of Lords debate in March 2026, the education minister Baroness Blake of Leeds said £13 million had been set aside for the first three years of a six-year programme.

== Reception ==
Music Mark, the membership body for music education providers, said in March 2026 that the gap between the centre's ambition and its funding was too wide. It compared the centre's annual budget, rising from £3.8 million to £5 million, with about £6 million a year for the maths equivalent. The Cultural Learning Alliance welcomed the centre but noted that the sector had favoured a not-for-profit body independent of government, and the DfE had instead chosen a commercial provider. It also asked how much of the money would reach classrooms.

In the Lords debate, Lord Freyberg said the centre was reported to have a smaller budget than the Arts Council "bridge organisations" it would replace. He also questioned its reliance on philanthropy to pay for work that school funding had previously covered. After the award, Music Mark's chief executive Jen McKie reported that members had asked why music had been dropped from the name and whether hubs would have to deliver a wider arts remit.

== See also ==
- Department for Education, the government department that commissioned the centre
- Arts Council England, current oversees the Music Hubs network
- National Centre for Excellence in the Teaching of Mathematics, a comparable DfE-funded centre for mathematics teaching
- English Baccalaureate
- Arts education
