= Teach Starter =

Publisher of Online Educational Resources

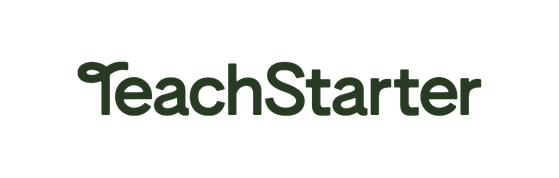
- Type: Private Company
- Industry: Education
- Founded: 12 August 2012
- Founders: Jill Snape and Scott Tonges
- Headquarters: Brisbane, Australia
- Area served: Worldwide
- Key people: Elizabeth McMillan (CEO)
- Products: Teaching resources, classroom solutions, and educator apps
- Website: www.teachstarter.com

Teach Starter is an online educational resources company that offers a subscription service to access teaching materials for educators. The company was founded by Jill Snape and Scott Tonges in 2012 and has since expanded to provide unit and lesson plans, activities, games and curriculum aligned worksheets for kindergarten to Year 6. It is currently headquartered in Brisbane, Australia, with an office in Austin, Texas, and operates internationally with a presence in the Australian, UK and US education markets.

== History ==
Teach Starter began with a poster Scott Tonges created for his wife, classroom teacher Jill Snape. After receiving positive feedback from other teachers they launched an email newsletter, and began creating additional resources, eventually launching a website with over 200 resources in January 2013. In 2020, Teach Starter briefly offered its resources for free as part of a response to the COVID-19 pandemic, later citing the move of classrooms online as creating a growth spurt for the business. In 2020, former Dictionary.com CEO Elizabeth McMillan was appointed as the Teach Starter CEO. As of 2022 the company had approximately 60 employees worldwide.

On 23 February 2023, Tes Global (publishers of the TES magazine), announced they had acquired Teach Starter to complement their teaching resources platform.

== Products ==
Teach Starter offers a free and paid subscription plan that allows access to a range of downloadable teaching resources, lesson plans, games and other online resources. The website's content is arranged using multiple categories such as grade level, subject or resource type. It provides resources that are aligned to curriculums including the Australian National Curriculum, Common Core State Standards in America, TEKS in Texas, and the National Curriculum for England. Specific curriculums for example the English Science Curriculum areas KS1, KS2 Lower and KS2 can be found via a curriculum search page.

In 2020 Teach Starter was reported to have over 780,000 accounts worldwide, 140,000 pages of teaching resources, and 35,000 podcast subscribers. It was also reported in the same year that 70 per cent of Australian Primary Schools and approximately 58 per cent of Australian primary school teachers used the platform.

== Awards and recognition ==
In 2020, Teach Starter founders Jill Snape and Scott Tonges were named in the Queensland Business Monthly Top 20 Under 40 list.

Teach Starter was a finalist in the 2022 Women in Digital Awards in the category of Employer of the Year.

Holon IQ has listed Teach Starter on its annual list of 50 most promising EdTech startups in Australia and New Zealand each year from 2020 to 2022.
