= Dolan DNA Learning Center =

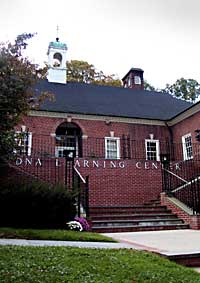
- Dolan DNA Learning Center, Cold Spring Harbor Laboratory, NY
- Established: September 1988
- Location: Cold Spring Harbor, New York
- Coordinates: 40.872910°N 73.451740°W
- Type: Science museum
- Website: www.dnalc.org

The DNA Learning Center (DNALC) is a genetics learning center affiliated with the Cold Spring Harbor Laboratory, in Cold Spring Harbor, New York. It is the world's first science center devoted entirely to genetics education and offers online education, class field trips, student summer day camps, and teacher training. The DNALC's family of internet sites cover broad topics including basic heredity, genetic disorders, eugenics, the discovery of the structure of DNA, DNA sequencing, cancer, neuroscience, and plant genetics.

The center developed a website called DNA Subway for the iPlant Collaborative.

== See also ==
- National Centre for Biotechnology Education, UK
