= Centre for Industry Education Collaboration =

British education resource

The Centre for Industry Education Collaboration (CIEC) is a British education resource for information about the chemical industry in the UK.

== History ==
The organisation was set up jointly by the Chemical Industries Association and the University of York in 1988 as the Chemical Industry Education Centre; it changed its name in 2014.

In June 2016 it won the Royal Society of Chemistry's Inspiration and Industry Award.

== Function ==
Research has shown that the ages from 10–14 are when children lose interest in science; the organisation seeks to have up-to-date course material for secondary school teachers that can invigorate science teaching.

It organises visits for schools to local chemical companies.

== Structure ==
It is headquartered in the Chemistry department of the University of York. It is a not-for-profit organisation, and is funded by companies in the British chemical industry. It has charitable status.

== See also ==
- BP Education Service
- National Centre for Computing Education, also at the University of York
- National Centre for Biotechnology Education, at the University of Reading
- Science education in England
