= Bisque =

Bisque may refer to:

- Biscuit porcelain, unglazed porcelain as a finished product
- Bisque (pottery), a piece of partially fired, or "biscuit-fired" unglazed pottery
- Bisque doll, a doll made of bisque or biscuit porcelain
- Bisque (food), a thick, creamy soup made from puréed seafood or vegetables
- Bisque, a free turn in a handicap croquet match
- Bisque, a free point in a handicap real tennis match
- Bisque, when a number of unpaired MPs in the United Kingdom may be allowed to be absent—at specified times on a rota basis—from votes in the Houses of Parliament.
- BisQue (Bioimage Analysis and Management Platform), a computer platform for the exchange and exploration of large, complex images and datasets
- bisque, a web color
