= National Centre for Biotechnology Education =

Educational organization in the UK

- Abbreviation: NCBE
- Formation: 1990
- Founded at: University of Reading, UK

The National Centre for Biotechnology Education (NCBE) is a national resource centre at the University of Reading to teach pre-university biotechnology in schools in the UK. It was founded in 1990.

== History ==
It began as the National Centre for School Biotechnology (NCSB) in 1985 in the Department of Microbiology. It became the NCBE in 1990. For many years it was the only centre in Europe that was devoted to the teaching of biotechnology in schools. The Dolan DNA Learning Center had been set up in the USA.

It was set up as an education project by the Society for General Microbiology, now the Microbiology Society. Money from the Laboratory of the Government Chemist set up the National Centre for School Biotechnology (NCSB). Money also came from the Gatsby Charitable Foundation. For the first five years, the UK government's DTI was involved, but from 1990 onwards wanted the organization to become self-supporting as it had to cut back on budgets. By 1992 the government provided no money for the centre.

== Structure ==
The site was set up in former buildings of the University of Reading's Department of Microbiology. In 2001, the NCBE moved to new purpose-built premises in the University’s School of Food Biosciences, however the creation of a new School of Pharmacy at the University forced the NCBE to move to new premises elsewhere on the campus in 2005.

== Function ==
It reaches out to schools to give up-to-date information on biotechnology. Biotechnology is a rapidly evolving subject, and schools cannot keep up-to-date with all that they would be required to know. It produces educational resources. It runs the Microbiology in Schools Advisory Committee (MISAC).

== See also ==
- Centre for Industry Education Collaboration at York
- National Centre for Excellence in the Teaching of Mathematics, University of York
- Science and Plants for Schools, another well-known science resource for UK schools
