= Hilary Shuard =

British mathematician (1928–1992)

Hilary Bertha Shuard CBE (14 November 1928 – 24 December 1992) was an expert on the teaching of mathematics in primary schools. She was a member of the Cockcroft Committee, and Deputy Principal of Homerton College, Cambridge for twenty years.

== Life ==
Shuard was born in Chester on 14 November 1928. She was educated in mathematics at Oxford and Cambridge Universities, and also gained blues in hockey and cricket at Cambridge.

Between 1953 and 1959, she taught at Christ's Hospital Hertford before joining the staff of the mathematics department at Homerton College Cambridge, where she remained until 1986. She was Deputy Principal of the college from 1966 until her retirement. Shuard was an "internationally known expert on mathematics in primary schools."

Shuard was president of the Mathematical Association for 1985–1986. From 1979 to 1989 she was President of the Cambridgeshire Women's Hockey Association.

In 1970, Shuard published Primary Mathematics Today with Elizabeth Williams, which has since become a standard reference for primary school mathematics teachers.

Shuard was a proponent of calculators in school, and was a member of the Cockcroft Committee, a government inquiry into mathematics education in schools. The Cockcroft Report was published in 1982. After this time Shuard set up the Prime project (Primary Initiatives in Mathematics Education), which was part of the National Curriculum Council, and included work on the acceptance of calculators in the primary curriculum, something for which Shuard was a strong advocate.

Shuard died in Cambridge on 24 December 1992, aged 64.

== Recognition ==
Shuard was awarded a CBE in 1987.
