= Count On =

British mathematics education project

Count On is a major mathematics education project in the United Kingdom which was announced by education secretary David Blunkett at the end of 2000. It was the follow-on to Maths Year 2000 which was the UK's contribution to UNICEF's World Mathematical Year.

Count On had two main strands:

- The website www.counton.org which won the 2002 BETT prize for best free online learning resource.
- "MathFests", which were maths funfairs held around the country, aimed particularly at those who would not normally come into contact with mathematical ideas.

== Popularisation of Mathematics ==
Count On and Maths Year 2000 were some of the first big Popularisation of Mathematics projects. Others are listed below.

=== International ===
- World Mathematical Year 2000
- Statistics 2013
- World Maths Day (orig. Australian) - next one is 6 March 2013

=== Australia ===
- World Maths Day

=== India ===
- National Mathematics Year

=== Ireland ===
- Maths Week Ireland

=== Nigeria ===
- National Mathematics Year

=== Spain ===
- Matematica Vital
- Paul Boron

=== United Kingdom ===
- Maths Year 2000 Scotland
- Maths Cymru (Wales)

=== United States ===
- Steven Strogatz's blog
