= National Mathematics Year =

Designation for 2012 in India and Nigeria

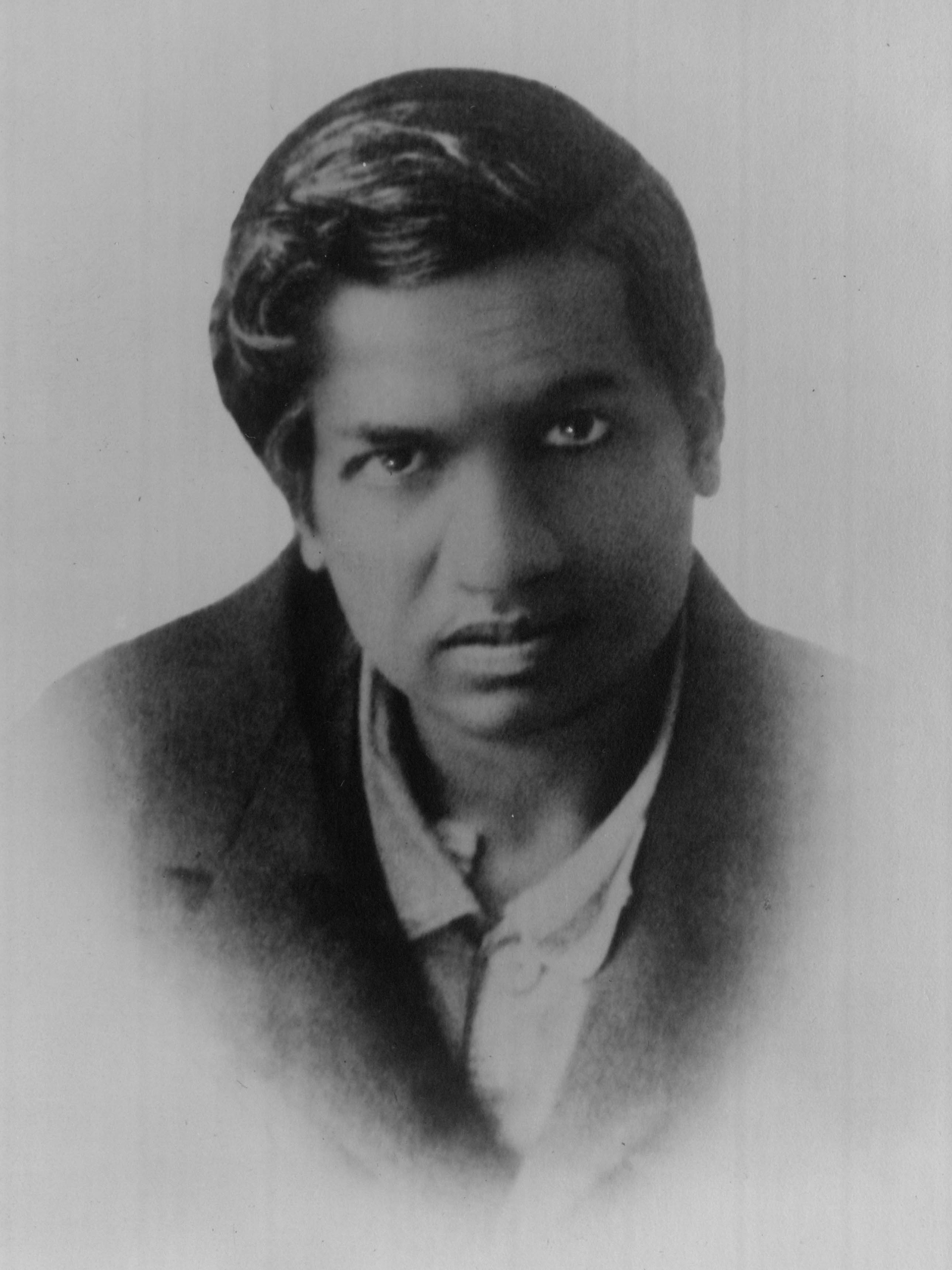
Srinivasa Ramanujan, whom the year honored.

In India and in Nigeria the year 2012 CE was celebrated as National Mathematics Year. In India, the National Mathematics Year was a tribute to the mathematical genius Srinivasa Ramanujan who was born on 22 December 1887 and whose 125th birthday falls on 22 December 2012. In Nigeria, the year 2012 was observed as National Mathematics Year as part of the federal government's effort to promote and popularize the study of mathematics.

== National Mathematics Year in India ==
The decision to designate the year 2012 CE as National Mathematics Year was announced by Dr Manmohan Singh, Prime Minister of India , during the inaugural ceremony of the celebrations to mark the 125th birth anniversary of Srinivasa Ramanujan held at the Madras University Centenary Auditorium on 26 February 2012. The Prime Minister also announced that December 22 would be celebrated as National Mathematics Day from 2012 onwards.

An Organising Committee with Professor M.S. Raghunathan, President of the Ramanujan Mathematical Society as chair, and Professor Dinesh Singh, Secretary of the Ramanujan Mathematical Society as secretary, has been formed to formulate and implement programmes and projects as part of the observance of the National Mathematics Year. A National Committee with Minister for Kapil Sibal as the chair supervises the activities of the Organising Committee.

== National Mathematics Year in Nigeria ==
In Nigeria, the various activities planned as part of the celebration of National Mathematics Year would be centred on the theme Mathematics: The Key to Transformation. The events were inaugurated on 1 March 2012 at a function in Musa Yar’adua Dome, Abuja. Thirteen projects of national importance are planned as part of the celebrations.
