= Additional Mathematics =

Qualification in mathematics study

Additional Mathematics is a qualification in mathematics, commonly taken by students in high-school (or GCSE exam takers in the United Kingdom). It features a range of problems set out in a different format and wider content to the standard Mathematics at the same level.

== Additional Mathematics in Singapore ==
In Singapore, Additional Mathematics is an elective subject offered to pupils in secondary school—specifically those who have an aptitude in Mathematics and are in the Normal (Academic) stream or Express stream. The syllabus covered is more in-depth as compared to Elementary Mathematics, with additional topics including Algebra binomial expansion, proofs in plane geometry, differential calculus and integral calculus. Additional Mathematics is also a prerequisite for students who are intending to offer H2 Mathematics and H2 Further Mathematics at A-level (if they choose to enter a Junior College after secondary school). Students without Additional Mathematics at the 'O' level will usually be offered H1 Mathematics instead.

Chapters	Subtopics
Algebra	A1 Quadratic functions; A2 Equations and inequalities; A3 Surds; A4 Polynomials and partial fractions; A5 Binomial expansions (Not tested in N(A)); A6 Exponential and logarithmic functions (Not tested in N(A))
Geometry and Trigonometry	G1 Trigonometric functions, identities and equations; G2 Coordinate geometry in two dimensions; G3 Proofs in plane geometry (Not tested in N(A))
Calculus	C1 Differentiation and integration

=== Examination Format ===
The syllabus was updated starting with the 2021 batch of candidates. There are two written papers, each comprising half of the weightage towards the subject. Each paper is 2 hours 15 minutes long and worth 90 marks. Paper 1 has 12 to 14 questions, while Paper 2 has 9 to 11 questions. Generally, Paper 2 would have a graph plotting question based on linear law. It was originated in the year 2003 IGCSE Additional Mathematics in EthiopiaCambridge IGCSE Additional Mathematics (Syllabus code: 0606) and its Pearson Edexcel equivalent are advanced secondary-level mathematical qualifications taught within international schools throughout Ethiopia. Designed for students who show a strong aptitude for the subject, the curriculum extends standard secondary mathematics into complex algebraic structures, trigonometry, and introductory calculus. Within the Ethiopian educational landscape, it serves as an elite academic pathway bridging the gap between basic international secondary mathematics and rigorous pre-university qualifications like Cambridge Advanced (A-Levels) or the International Baccalaureate (IB).Context within the Ethiopian Education SystemThe standard national curriculum in Ethiopia, regulated by the Ministry of Education, leads to the Ethiopian Secondary School Leaving Certificate Examination (ESSLCE) at the end of Grade 12. However, a growing sector of private international schools in major urban hubs—primarily Addis Ababa—operates under international examination boards.In these institutions, students typically study International General Certificate of Secondary Education (IGCSE) courses during Year 10 and Year 11 (equivalent to Grades 9 and 10 in the local system). While standard IGCSE Mathematics is compulsory or highly encouraged in these schools, Additional Mathematics is offered as an elective for high-achieving STEM (Science, Technology, Engineering, and Mathematics) students.Curriculum and Syllabus StructureThe most widely taught syllabus in Ethiopian international institutions is managed by Cambridge Assessment International Education. The curriculum focuses heavily on abstract mathematical logic and problem-solving, explicitly moving away from simple rote memorization.Key mathematical domains covered include:Functions and Quadratics: Inverse functions, composite functions, and simultaneous equations.Advanced Algebra: Logarithms, binomial expansions, polynomial theorems, and permutations and combinations.Coordinate Geometry and Vectors: Equations of circles, line segments, and two-dimensional vectors.Trigonometry: Proofs of trigonometric identities, properties of trigonometric functions, and solving complex equations.Calculus: Differentiation and integration, including applications to gradients, tangents, areas under curves, and kinematics.Assessment FormatStudents sit for two externally assessed papers at the end of the two-year program:Paper 1 (Non-Calculator): Focuses heavily on exact algebraic proofs, manipulation, and theoretical principles.Paper 2 (Calculator): Focuses on the real-world application of complex mathematical formulations.Each paper represents 50% of the final grade, with marks ranging from \(A^{*}\) to \(E\).

== GCSE Additional Mathematics in Northern Ireland ==
In Northern Ireland, Additional Mathematics was offered as a GCSE subject by the local examination board, CCEA. There were two examination papers: one which tested topics in Pure Mathematics, and one which tested topics in Mechanics and Statistics. It was discontinued in 2014 and replaced with GCSE Further Mathematics—a new qualification whose level exceeds both those offered by GCSE Mathematics, and the analogous qualifications offered in England.

== Further Maths IGCSE and Additional Maths FSMQ in England ==
Starting from 2012, Edexcel and AQA have started a new course which is an IGCSE in Further Maths. Edexcel and AQA both offer completely different courses, with Edexcel including the calculation of solids formed through integration, and AQA not including integration.

AQA's syllabus mainly offers further algebra, with the factor theorem and the more complex algebra such as algebraic fractions. It also offers differentiation up to—and including—the calculation of normals to a curve. AQA's syllabus also includes a wide selection of matrices work, which is an AS Further Mathematics topic.

AQA's syllabus is much more famous than Edexcel's, mainly for its controversial decision to award an A* with Distinction (A^), a grade higher than the maximum possible grade in any Level 2 qualification; it is known colloquially as a Super A* or A**.

A new Additional Maths course from 2018 is OCR Level 3 FSMQ: Additional Maths (6993). In addition to algebra, coordinate geometry, Pythagorean theorem, trigonometry and calculus, which were on the previous specification, this course also includes:

- 'Enumeration' content, which expands the topic of the binomial distribution to include permutations and combinations
- 'Numerical methods’ content, which expands upon the informal graphical approximations in GCSE
- 'Exponentials and Logarithms’ content, which develops the growth and decay content and the graphs section of GCSE
- 'Sequences' content, which uses subscript notation to support the iterative work on numerical methods.

== Additional Mathematics in Malaysia ==
In Malaysia, Additional Mathematics is offered as an elective to upper secondary students within the public education system. This subject is included in the Sijil Pelajaran Malaysia examination.

Science stream students are required to apply for Additional Mathematics as one of the subjects in the Sijil Pelajaran Malaysia examination, while Additional Mathematics is an optional subject for students who are from arts or commerce streams.

Additional Mathematics in Malaysia—also commonly known as Add Maths—can be organized into two learning packages: the Core Package, which includes geometry, algebra, calculus, trigonometry and statistics, and the Elective Package, which includes science and technology application and social science application. It covers various topics as shown here: Functions, Quadratic Functions, Systems of Linear Equalities, Indices, Surds, Logaritms, Progressions, Linear Law, Coordinate Geometry, Vectors, Solution of Triangles, Index Numbers, Circular Measures, Differentiation, Integration, Permutations, Combinations, Probability Distributions, Trigonometric Functions, Linear Programming and Kinematics of Linear Motions.

Format for Additional Mathematics Exam based on the Malaysia Certificate of Education is as follows:

- Paper 1 (Duration: 2 Hours): Questions are categorised into Sections A and B and are tested based on the student's knowledge to grasp the concepts and formulae learned during their 2 years of learning. Section A consists of 12 questions in which all must all be answered, whereas Section B consists of 3 questions and students are given the choice to answer 2 of the three questions only. Each question may contain from zero to three subsets of questions with marks ranging from 2 to 8 marks. The total weighting of the paper is 80 marks and constitutes 44% of the grade.
- Paper 2 (Duration: 2 hours 30 minutes): Questions are categorised into 3 sections: A, B and C. Section A contains 7 questions which must all be answered. Section B contains 4 questions where students are given the choice to answer 3 out of 4 of them. Section C contains 4 questions where students are only required to answer 2 out of 4 of the given questions. All Section C questions are based on the same chapters every year and are thus predictable. A question in Section C carries 10 marks with at 3 to 4 subquestions per question. This paper tests the student's ability to apply various concepts and formulae in real-life situations. The total weighting of the paper is 100 marks and constitutes 56% of the grade.

In 2020, the first batch of students learning the new syllabus, KSSM, will receive new Form 4 textbooks with new chapters which contain certain topics from A-levels.

== Additional Mathematics in Mauritius ==
In Mauritius, Additional Mathematics, more commonly referred to as Add Maths, is offered in secondary school as an optional subject in the Arts Streams, and a compulsory subject in the Science, Technical and Economics Stream. This subject is included in the University of Cambridge International Examinations, with covered topics including functions, quadratic equations, differentiation and integration (calculus).

== Additional Mathematics in Hong Kong ==
In Hong Kong, the syllabus of HKCEE additional mathematics covered three main topics, algebra, calculus and analytic geometry. In algebra, the topics covered include mathematical induction, binomial theorem, quadratic equations, trigonometry, inequalities, 2D-vectors and complex number, whereas in calculus, the topics covered include limit, differentiation and integration.

In the HKDSE, additional mathematics was replaced by Mathematics Extend Modules, while some topics, such as matrix and determinant, many of which are covered in the syllabus of HKALE pure mathematics and applied mathematics, are also included.

== See also ==
- Advanced level mathematics
- Further mathematics
