= Mathematics in Education and Industry =

Educational charity and curriculum development body

- Abbreviation: MEI
- Formation: 1963
- Type: Educational charity
- Legal status: Private limited company (03265490)
- Purpose: MEI is committed to improving mathematics education
- Headquarters: Monckton House
- Location: Trowbridge, Wiltshire, England
- Chief Executive: Charlie Stripp
- Website: MEI

MEI (Mathematics in Education and Industry) is an independent educational charity and curriculum development body for mathematics education in the United Kingdom. Income generated through its work is used to support the teaching and learning of mathematics.

== History ==
MEI was founded in 1963 with a grant from the Schools & Industry Committee of the Mathematical Association. In 1965 it produced its first exam, Additional Mathematics, then produced an A level course two years later. MEI's A-level exams were the first to include probability.

It was incorporated as a company on 18 October 1996.

== Structure ==
Although independent, MEI works in partnership with many organisations, including the UK Government. MEI is a registered charity with a board of directors and a small professional staff.

== Qualifications ==
- GCE AS/A level Mathematics, Further Mathematics and Further Mathematics (Additional) (Published by OCR)
- AS Level Statistics
- GCSE Mathematics
- Foundations of Advanced Mathematics (FAM) – a freestanding course
- Introduction to Quantitative Methods (in association with OCR)
- OCR MEI Level 3 Core Maths Qualifications (Level 3 Certificate in Quantitative Reasoning and Level 3 Certificate in Quantitative Problem Solving)

== Competitions ==
MEI organises an annual online competition called Ritangle for teams of students of A level Mathematics, the International Baccalaureate and Scottish Highers. Questions are posted on the Integral website, with correct answers releasing a clue for the final question.
