= IPlant Collaborative =

Cyverse (formerly iPlant Collaborative)
- Website type: Scientific support
- Available in: English
- Website: cyverse.org
- Commercial: No
- Launched: 2008

The iPlant Collaborative, renamed Cyverse in 2017, is a virtual organization created by a cooperative agreement funded by the US National Science Foundation (NSF) to create cyberinfrastructure for the plant sciences (botany). The NSF compared cyberinfrastructure to physical infrastructure, "... the distributed computer, information and communication technologies combined with the personnel and integrating components that provide a long-term platform to empower the modern scientific research endeavor". In September 2013 it was announced that the National Science Foundation had renewed iPlant's funding for a second 5-year term with an expansion of scope to all non-human life science research.

The project develops computing systems and software that combine computing resources, like those of TeraGrid, and bioinformatics and computational biology software. Its goal is easier collaboration among researchers with improved data access and processing efficiency. Primarily centered in the United States, it collaborates internationally.

== History ==
Biology is relying more and more on computers. Plant biology is changing with the rise of new technologies. With the advent of bioinformatics, computational biology, DNA sequencing, geographic information systems and others computers can greatly assist researchers who study plant life looking for solutions to challenges in medicine, biofuels, biodiversity, agriculture and problems like drought tolerance, plant breeding, and sustainable farming. Many of these problems cross traditional disciplines and facilitating collaboration between plant scientists of diverse backgrounds and specialties is necessary.

In 2006, the NSF solicited proposals to create "a new type of organization – a cyberinfrastructure collaborative for plant science" with a program titled "Plant Science Cyberinfrastructure Collaborative" (PSCIC) with Christopher Greer as program director. A proposal was accepted (adopting the convention of using the word "Collaborative" as a noun) and iPlant was officially created on February 1, 2008. Funding was estimated as $10 million per year over five years.

Richard Jorgensen led the team through the proposal stage and was the principal investigator (PI) from 2008 to 2009. Gregory Andrews, Vicki Chandler, Sudha Ram and Lincoln Stein served as Co-Principal Investigators (Co-PIs) from 2008 to 2009. In late 2009, Stephen Goff was named PI and Daniel Stanzione was added as a Co-PI. As of May 2014, Co-PI Stanzione was replaced by 4 new Co-PIs: Doreen Ware at Cold Spring Harbor, Nirav Merchant and Eric Lyons at the University of Arizona, and Matthew Vaughn at the Texas Advanced Computing Center.

The iPlant project supports what has been called e-Science, which is a use of information systems technology that is being adopted by the research community in efforts such as the National Center for Ecological Analysis and Synthesis (NCEAS), ELIXIR, and the Bamboo Technology Project that started in September 2010. iPlant is "designed to create the foundation to support the computational needs of the research community and facilitate progress toward solutions of major problems in plant biology."

The project works as a collaboration. It seeks input from the wider plant science community on what to build. Based on that input, it has enabled easier use of large data sets, created a community-driven research environment to share existing data collections within a research area and between research areas and shares data with provenance tracking. One model studied for collaboration was Wikipedia.

Several more recent National Science Foundation awards mentioned iPlant explicitly in their descriptions, as either a design pattern to follow or a collaborator with whom the recipient will work.

=== Institutions ===
The primary institution for the iPlant project is the University of Arizona, located within the BIO5 Institute in Tucson. Since its inception in 2008, personnel worked at other institutions including Cold Spring Harbor Laboratory, University of North Carolina, Wilmington, and the University of Texas at Austin in the Texas Advanced Computing Center. Purdue University and Arizona State University were part of the original project group.

Other collaborating institutions that received support from iPlant for their work on a Grand Challenge in phylogenetics starting in March 2009 included Yale University, University of Florida, and the University of Pennsylvania. A trait evolution group was led at the University of Tennessee. A visualization workshop employing iPlant was run by Virginia Tech in 2011.

The NSF requires that funding subcontracts stay within the United States, but international collaboration started in 2009 with the Technical University of Munich and the University of Toronto in 2010. East Main Evaluation & Consulting provides external oversight, advice, and assistance.

== Services ==
The iPlant project makes its cyberinfrastructure available several different ways and offers services to make it accessible to its primary audience. The design was meant to grow in response to needs of the research community it serves.

=== The Discovery Environment ===
The Discovery Environment integrates community-recommended software tools into a system that can handle terabytes of data using high-performance supercomputers to perform these tasks much more quickly. It has an interface designed to hide the complexity needed to do this from the end user. The goal was to make the cyberinfrastructure available to non-technical end users who are not as comfortable using a command-line interface.

=== iPlant Foundational APIs ===
A set of application programming interfaces (APIs) for developers allow access to iPlant services, including authentication, data management, high performance supercomputing resources from custom, locally produced software.

=== Atmosphere ===
Atmosphere is a cloud computing platform that provides easy access to pre-configured, frequently used analysis routines, relevant algorithms, and data sets, and accommodates computationally and data-intensive bioinformatics tasks. It uses the Eucalyptus virtualization platform.

=== iPlant Semantic Web ===
The iPlant Semantic Web effort uses an iPlant-created architecture, protocol, and platform called the Simple Semantic Web Architecture and Protocol (SSWAP) for semantic web linking using a plant science focused ontology. SSWAP is based on the notion of RESTful web services with an ontology based on Web Ontology Language (OWL).

=== Taxonomic Name Resolution Service ===
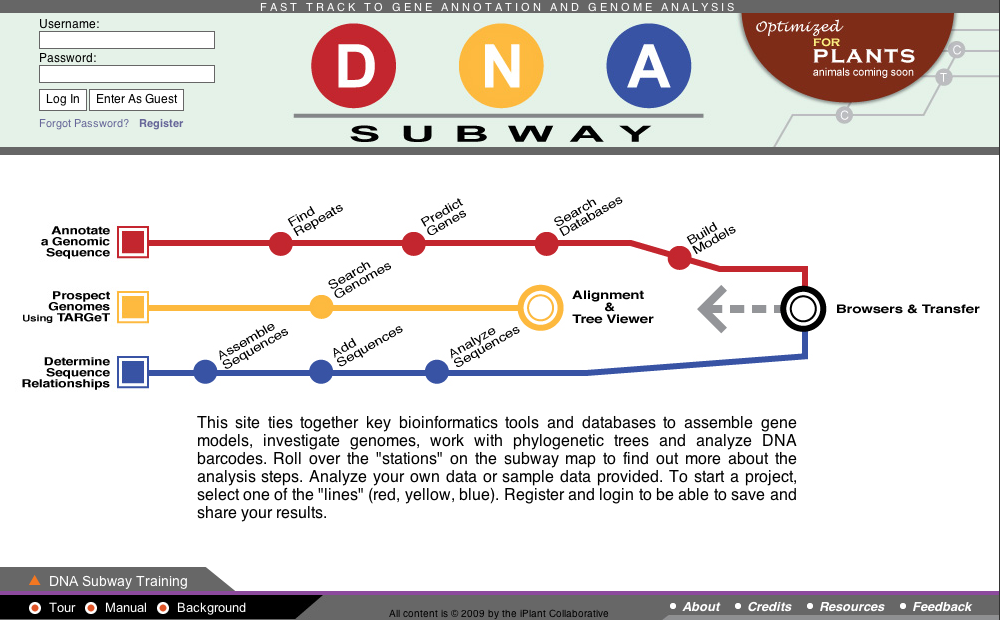
Screen shot of the DNA Subway tool

The Taxonomic Name Resolution Service (TNRS) is a free utility for correcting and standardizing plant names. This is needed because plant names that are misspelled, out of date (because a newer synonym is preferred), or incomplete make it hard to use computers to process large lists.

=== My-Plant ===
My-Plant.org is a social networking community for plant biologists, educators and others to come together to share information and research, collaborate, and track the latest developments in plant science. The My-Plant network uses the terminology clades to group users in a manner similar to phylogenetics of plants themselves. It was implemented using Drupal as its content management system.

=== DNA Subway ===
The DNA Subway website uses a graphical user interface (GUI) to generate DNA sequence annotations, explore plant genomes for members of gene and transposon families, and conduct phylogenetic analyses. It makes high-level DNA analysis available to faculty and students by simplifying annotation and comparative genomics workflows. It was developed for iPlant by the Dolan DNA Learning Center.
