= Science Learning Centres =

Science Learning Centres are a UK government initiative to address the need for improved science education and development for teachers in England.

== Origins ==
In 2001, a House of Lords Science & Technology Select Committee Report identified an urgent need for subject-specific continuing professional development for science teachers. In response to this and numerous other calls for action, the Department for Education and Skills and the Wellcome Trust invested £51 million in the creation of the national network of Science Learning Centres. After a competitive tendering process the first Science Learning Centre opened its doors in October 2004. Today the centres are more than just a location for training courses, they are rapidly becoming the focus for all science education activity in the United Kingdom.

== Continuing professional development ==
Science Learning Centres run courses that provide continuing professional development for anyone involved in the teaching of science, from those working with reception aged children to post 16 students, including primary and secondary teachers, technicians, teaching assistants and FE lecturers.

The aim of all Science Learning Centres is to reconnect teachers with the frontiers of their subject and the latest techniques for teaching it. Teachers who attend courses are given the opportunity to renew and extend their teaching skills by mixing with and learning from colleagues who face similar challenges to their own, and have access to the UK's leading experts in science educational research.

== Centres ==
There are 10 Science Learning Centres around the country. One to serve each of the nine English government regions and a National Science Learning Centre (based in the University of York) which provides training for anyone from England, Scotland, Wales or Northern Ireland. Each Centre is run by a consortium of organisations, which vary from local councils and professional bodies to universities, schools, science centres and industry partners.

- The National Science Learning Centre, located in York
- Science Learning Centre East of England, located in Hertfordshire
- Science Learning Centre East Midlands, located in Leicester
- Science Learning Centre London
- Science Learning Centre North East, located in Durham
- Science Learning Centre North West, located in Manchester
- Science Learning Centre South East, at the University of Southampton is now the Mathematics and Science Learning Centre (MSLC)
- Science Learning Centre South West, located in Bristol
- Science Learning Centre West Midlands, located in Keele
- Science Learning Centre Yorkshire & the Humber, located in Sheffield

== Courses ==
The courses offered at the regional centres usually feature one day's training at the centre, together with ongoing support through classroom exercises and online materials. The National Science Learning Centre, based at the University of York, offers residential courses for teachers, providing access to the facilities for teachers of two or more days, often spread across more than one term.

== Ambitions ==
The national network of Science Learning Centres has been created with ambitious goals in mind; not least to help British teachers, lecturers, technicians and classroom assistants to lead the world in science education by 2015.

== See also ==
- Science education in England
- List of science centers#Europe
