= Further Mathematics =

Certain type of mathematics from secondary school onwards

Further Mathematics is the title given to a number of advanced secondary mathematics courses. The term "Higher and Further Mathematics", and the term "Advanced Level Mathematics", may also refer to any of several advanced mathematics courses at many institutions.

Globally, "Further Mathematics" or "Further Maths" describes a course studied in addition to mathematics at GCSE, GCE AS-Level and A-Level or their equivalent, or one which is delivered as part of the International Baccalaureate Diploma.

In the United Kingdom, Further Mathematics describes a course studied in addition to the standard mathematics AS-Level and A-Level courses. In the state of Victoria in Australia, it describes a course delivered as part of the Victorian Certificate of Education (see § Australia (Victoria) for a more detailed explanation).

== United Kingdom ==
=== Background ===
Further mathematics can be studied at GCSE level, and at A-Level.

A qualification in Further Mathematics involves studying both pure and applied modules. Whilst the pure modules (formerly known as Pure 4–6 or Core 4–6, now known as Further Pure 1–3, where 4 exists for the AQA board) build on knowledge from the core mathematics modules, the applied modules may start from first principles.

The Edexcel exam board involves 2 Core Pure modules studied in school years 12 and 13 respectively, students also pick 2 of the further modules that consist of Decision Mathematics 1 and 2, Further Pure Mathematics 1 and 2, Further Statistics 1 and 2 and finally Further Mechanics 1 and 2. Students may pick module 1 of two separate topics or the first and second of the same module. The statistics and mechanics modules follow on from the normal A level mathematics qualification and further pure follows on from the core pure modules. Decision mathematics is a new addition to the curriculum and requires no previous knowledge from the A level.

The structure of the qualification varies between exam boards.

With regard to Mathematics degrees, most universities do not require Further Mathematics, instead offering foundation modules or "catch-up" classes. Exceptions include the University of Warwick, the University of Cambridge (which requires it to at least AS level), University College London (which requires or recommends an A2), and Imperial College (which requires an A in A level Further Maths). Other universities may recommend it or give lower offers in return. Some schools and colleges do not offer Further Mathematics, but online resources are available. Although around 60% of students achieve an A grade, they are generally assumed to be more proficient, and there is significant topic overlap with base Mathematics courses at A level.

=== Support ===
There are numerous sources of support for both teachers and students. The AMSP (formerly FMSP) is a government-funded organisation that offers professional development, enrichment activities and is a source of additional materials via its website. Registering with AMSP gives access to Integral, another source of both teaching and learning materials hosted by Mathematics Education Innovation (MEI). Underground Mathematics is another resource in active development which reflects the emphasis on problem solving and reasoning in the UK curriculum. A collection of tasks for post-16 mathematics can be also found on the NRICH site.

== Australia (Victoria) ==
In contrast with other Further Mathematics courses, Further Maths as part of the VCE is the easiest level of mathematics, it is said to be the easiest because it gives full understanding to a particular to that is being taught in further math. Any student wishing to undertake tertiary studies in areas such as Science, Engineering, Commerce, Economics and some Information Technology courses must undertake one or both of the other two VCE maths subjects— Mathematical Methods or Specialist Mathematics. The Further Mathematics syllabus in VCE consists of three core modules, which all students undertake, plus two modules chosen by the student (or usually by the school or teacher) from a list of four. The core modules are Univariate Data, Bivariate Data, Time Series, Number Patterns and Business-Related Mathematics. The optional modules are Geometry and Trigonometry, Graphs and Relations, Networks and Decision Mathematics, or Matrices.

== Singapore ==
Further Mathematics is available as a second and higher mathematics course at A Level (now H2), in addition to the mathematics course at A Level. Students can pursue this subject if they have A2 and better in 'O' Level Mathematics and Additional Mathematics, depending on the school. Some topics covered in this course include mathematical induction, complex number, polar curve and conic sections, differential equations, recurrence relations, matrices and linear spaces, numerical methods, random variables and hypothesis testing and confidence intervals.

== International Baccalaureate Diploma ==
Further Mathematics, as studied within the International Baccalaureate Diploma Programme, was a Higher Level (HL) course that could be taken in conjunction with Mathematics HL or on its own. It consisted of studying all four of the options in Mathematics HL, plus two additional topics.

Topics studied in Further Mathematics included:

- Topic 1 – Linear algebra – studies on matrices, vector spaces, linear and geometric transformations
- Topic 2 – Geometry – closer look on triangles, circles and conic sections
- Topic 3 – Statistics and probability – the geometric and negative binomial distributions, unbiased estimators, statistical hypothesis testing and an introduction to bivariate distributions
- Topic 4 – Sets, relations and groups – algebra of sets, ordered pairs, binary operations and group homomorphism
- Topic 5 – Calculus – infinite sequences and series, limits, improper integrals and various first-order ordinary differential equations
- Topic 6 – Discrete mathematics – complete mathematical induction, linear Diophantine equations, Fermat's little theorem, route inspection problem and recurrence relations

From 2019, the course has been discontinued and transited into the following modules:

- Mathematics: analysis and approaches SL
- Mathematics: analysis and approaches HL
- Mathematics: applications and interpretation SL
- Mathematics: applications and interpretation HL and Operations Research

== See also ==
- Additional Mathematics
- Advanced level mathematics
