= Wilfred Cockcroft =

British mathematics educator (1923 - 1999)

Sir Wilfred Halliday Cockcroft (7 June 1923 – 27 September 1999) was an eminent mathematics educator from the University of Hull.

== Early life ==
He attended Keighley Boys' Grammar School, now called Beckfoot Oakbank, and studied Mathematics at Balliol College, Oxford. During WWII he worked in radar.

== Career ==
=== Mathematics report ===
In 1978 he was commissioned by the then Labour government to chair a comprehensive inquiry into the teaching of mathematics in primary and secondary schools in England and Wales. The committee of inquiry produced its report in 1982, published as Mathematics Counts but widely known as "the Cockcroft report".

=== Examinations ===
From 1983 to 1988 he was Chairman and Chief Executive of the Secondary Exams Council.

== Personal life ==
He married in 1949, with two sons, and later married in 1982.

Cockcroft was knighted in 1983, and in May 1984 was awarded an honorary degree of Doctor of the University from the Open University.
