= Science education in England =

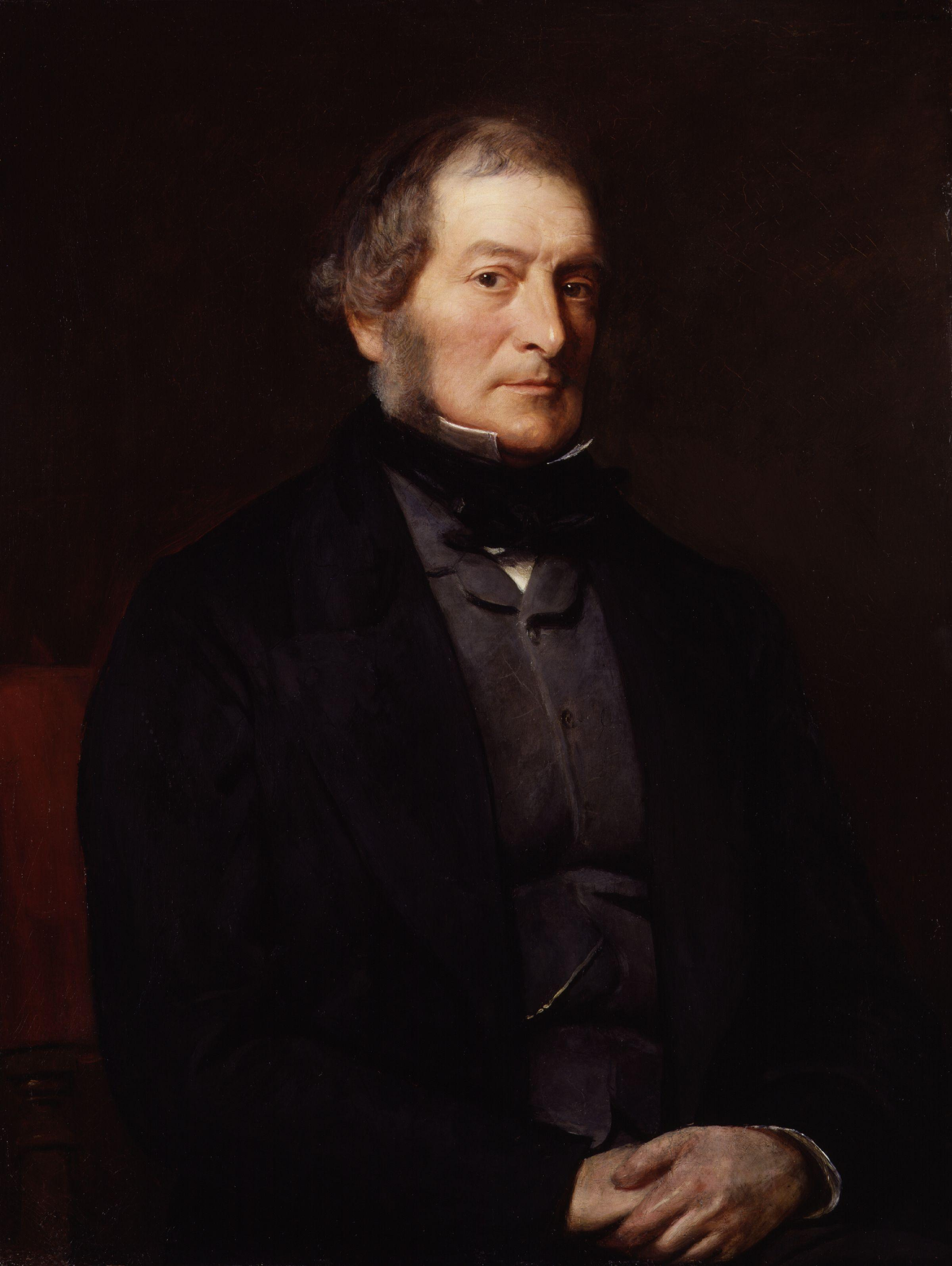
Lord Taunton (portrait by William Menzies Tweedie) chaired a British parliamentary committee in the 1860s that recommended the inclusion of natural science in the school curriculum. It was the first time such a recommendation had come from Parliament.

Science education in England is generally regulated at all levels for assessments that are England's, from 'primary' to 'tertiary' (university). Below university level, science education is the responsibility of three bodies: the Department for Education, Ofqual and the QAA, but at university level, science education is regulated by various professional bodies, and the Bologna Process via the QAA. The QAA also regulates science education for some qualifications that are not university degrees via various qualification boards, but not content for GCSEs, and GCE AS and A levels. Ofqual on the other hand, regulates science education for GCSEs and AS/A levels, as well as all other qualifications, except those covered by the QAA, also via qualification boards.

The Department for Education prescribes the content for science education for GCSEs and AS/A levels, which is implemented by the qualification boards, who are then regulated by Ofqual. The Department for Education also regulates science education for students aged 16 years and under. The department's policies on science education (and indeed all subjects) are implemented by local government authorities in all state schools (also called publicly funded schools) in England. The content of the nationally organised science curriculum (along with other subjects) for England is published in the National Curriculum, which covers key stage 1 (KS1), key stage 2 (KS2), key stage 3 (KS3) and key stage 4 (KS4). The four key stages can be grouped a number of ways; how they are grouped significantly affects the way the science curriculum is delivered. In state schools, the four key stages are grouped into KS1–2 and KS3–4; KS1–2 covers primary education while KS3–4 covers secondary education. But in private or 'public' (which in the United Kingdom are historic independent) schools (not to be confused with 'publicly funded' schools), the key stage grouping is more variable, and rather than using the terms ‘primary’ and 'secondary’, the terms ‘prep’ and ‘senior’ are used instead.

Science is a compulsory subject in the National Curriculum of England, Wales, and Northern Ireland; state schools have to follow the National Curriculum while independent schools need not follow it. That said, science is compulsory in the Common Entrance Examinations for entry into senior schools, so it does feature prominently in the curricula of independent schools. Beyond the National Curriculum and Common Entrance Examinations, science is optional, but the government of the United Kingdom (comprising England, Wales, Scotland, and Northern Ireland) provides incentives for students to continue studying science subjects. Science is regarded as vital to the economic growth of the United Kingdom (UK). For students aged 16 years (the upper limit of compulsory school age in England but not compulsory education as a whole) and over, there is no compulsory nationally organised science curriculum for all state/publicly funded education providers in England to follow, and individual providers can set their own content, although they often (and in the case of England's state/publicly funded post-16 schools and colleges have to) get their science (and indeed all) courses accredited or made satisfactory (ultimately by either Ofqual or the QAA via the qualification boards). Universities do not need such approval, but there is a reason for them to seek accreditation regardless. Moreover, UK universities have obligations to the Bologna Process to ensure high standards. Science education in England has undergone significant changes over the centuries; facing challenges over that period, and still facing challenges to this day.

== History ==
=== Up to 1800 ===
Gillard (2011) gives a documented account of science curriculum and education during this period. According to his work, the teaching of science in England dates back to at least Anglo-Saxon times. Gillard explains that the first schools in England (that are known of) were created by St Augustine when he brought Christianity to England around the end of the sixth century—there were almost certainly schools in Roman Britain before St Augustine, but they did not survive after the Romans left. It is thought the first grammar school was established at Canterbury in 598 during the reign of King Ethelbert. Gillard also mentions that in Bede's Ecclesiastical History, science (in the form of astronomy) was already part of the curriculum in the early schools of the 600s. As the founding of grammar schools spread from south to north of England, science education spread with it. Science, as it is known today, developed from two spheres of knowledge: natural philosophy and natural history. The former was associated with the reasoning and explanation of nature while the latter focused more on living things. Both strands of knowledge can be identified in a curriculum provided by a school in York run by Alcuin in the 770s and 780s. Subsequent Viking invasions of England interrupted the development of schools, but despite this, through the ages, education in England was provided by the church and grammar schools (which were linked to the church). The link between church and school started to change in the 1300s when schools independent of the church began to emerge. University education in England started in Oxford in the 1100s (although there is evidence that teaching began there in the 1000s). Like pre-university education, science at Oxford University was initially taught in the form of astronomy (as part of the quadrivium). The Renaissance spurred physical inquiry into nature which led to natural philosophy developing into physics and chemistry, and natural history developing into biology; these three disciplines form natural science, from which interdisciplinary fields (or at least their modern versions) that overlap two or all three branches of natural science develop. This emerging trend in physical inquiry does not appear to have been reflected in the science curriculum in schools at the time. Even in universities, the changes to science education that were necessary as a result of the Renaissance occurred very slowly. It was not till the 1800s that the science curriculum and education recognised in England today at all levels truly began to emerge.

=== 1800s ===
Up until the 1800s, there were only two stages of education: elementary and university. However, in the nineteenth century, elementary education began to divide into primary (still called elementary) and secondary education. Elementary schools were defined in law in England through a series of Acts of Parliament which made education compulsory and free for children up to the age of 11 (later increased to 12). There were six (and later seven) standards for children to pass; science education did not feature in any of these standards, but for some schools, it was an add-on, especially at the higher standards (such as sixth and seventh—science subjects included physics, chemistry, mechanics). Promotion from one standard to the next was on merit and not age. Not all children completed all standards, which meant that by the age of 12, there were children that had not ‘completed’ their elementary education. Of course, families that could afford (and wanted) to keep their children in school post-compulsory age to pass all standards did so. In fact, some children stayed in school beyond the seventh standard. Schools that offered post-seventh standard education became known as higher grade schools, of which science education was a recognised feature of their curricula.

==== Taunton Report 1868 ====
This was by far the single most important development for science education in schools in England in the nineteenth century from a British parliament point of view. Ironically, the original purpose of the committee that authored the 'Taunton' Report of 1868, or more formally, Volume II Miscellaneous Papers of the Schools Inquiry Commission (1868), was to examine how best endowed schools should be managed, something Parliament at the time thought was of utmost importance. The committee for the report was chaired by Lord Taunton (born Henry Labouchere). In heading the preparation for the report, Lord Taunton sent a circular letter listing four questions to a number of prominent people in different parts of England on 28 May 1866; the first three were endowment-related issues, but the fourth question was on how to encourage a due supply of qualified teachers. Apart from the contents page, the word "science" first appears on page 45 of the report in a reply by one of the recipients of the circular letter; that recipient was Reverend W C Lake. The reverend comments:

The question as to the best mode to be adopted for obtaining teachers both in sufficient numbers, and of the kind desirable for middle-class, education, seems to me more difficult than it would at first appear. ... you want men with an University culture, and yet not with exactly an University education ... You do not, I presume, want them to teach Greek; and as to Latin it ought not, in my opinion at least, to be the staple work of the school compared with arithmetic, some mathematics, modern languages, and history, and the principles of some important branches of physical science.

(Rev. Lake's reply to Lord Taunton IN Report by Schools Inquiry Commission, 1868: p45)

On page 77 of the report, Edward Twisleton, a member of the Schools Inquiry Commission, comments on the answers provided to the four questions set by the committee's chairman, Lord Taunton, based on feedback from the circular letter sent. To the first question, Twisleton writes:

In providing,—what is generally a part of the arrangements of Prussian gymnasia—a museum of natural history and a cabinet with the philosophical instruments and other materials requisite for instruction in the experimental sciences. The Prussian system should be followed, in which two hours of each week are devoted throughout the school to lessons in these branches of knowledge; the instruction in the lower classes being in sciences of pure observation, such, as zoology and botany, while in the upper parts of the school instruction is given in the sciences usually called experimental, such as pneumatics, hydrostatics, and others. This system, however, cannot be adopted, unless there is a certain preliminary outlay of money, and it seems unobjectionable that this money should come from an endowment.

(Twisleton's response IN Report by Schools Inquiry Commission, 1868: p77)

There were noticeable opinions on the issue of science education from contributors that wrote to the committee to express their views. One by Robert Mosley of Holgate Seminary, York (pages 104 to 105 of the report), suggested the inclusion of physical sciences in a 'National education'; this national education being the best way to utilise educational endowment. Based on feedback from contributors, the Taunton Committee gave several arguments in favour of science education; two of them are:

- As providing the best discipline in observation and collection of facts, in the combination of inductive with deductive reasoning, and in accuracy both of thought and language.

and

- Because the methods and results of science have so profoundly affected all the philosophical thought of the age, that an educated man is under a very great disadvantage if he is unacquainted with them.

(Report by Schools Inquiry Commission, 1868: p219)

The committee subsequently made several recommendations; the first three on promoting scientific education in schools are listed below:

i. That in all schools natural science be one of the subjects to be taught, and that in every public school at least one natural science master be appointed for the purpose.
ii. That at least three hours a week be devoted to such scientific instruction.
iii. That natural science should be placed on an equal footing with mathematics and modern languages in effecting promotions and in winning honours and prizes.

(Report by Schools Inquiry Commission, 1868: p222)

The issue of increased cost for fee payers played heavily on the minds of the committee, and although the committee felt that for "a wealthy country like England" (page 219 of the report), a slight increase in cost should not be a barrier to science education, it was left to individual schools to decide how to incorporate science into their curricula.

==== Red brick universities ====
By the time of the Taunton Report, there were four universities in England (Oxford, Cambridge, Durham, and London), but from the 1880s, a new wave of universities / university colleges completely separate from the original four began to emerge; these universities were called red brick universities. The first of these universities was established in Manchester in 1880 and was called Victoria University. Over the subsequent 80 years, a further 11 universities outside London, Cambridge, Durham, and Oxford were founded, significantly expanding the availability of university (science) education throughout England. All through the 1800s, science was becoming increasingly specialised into the different areas we know today.

=== 1900s ===
The Education Act 1902 led to the higher grade schools (alluded to earlier) and fee-paying schools being absorbed into the legally defined “higher education” (meaning any education that was not elementary (as primary education was known at the time)). Despite science education in higher grade schools and the recommendations of the Taunton Report, as well as the British Association for the Advancement of Science's campaign for a science curriculum, science was still seen as a minor subject by the most prestigious public schools. The problem was that most of these public schools had close relationships with Oxford and Cambridge universities which offered the majority of their scholarships in classics, and so science was regarded in low importance by the prestigious schools. Consequently, science education varied significantly across English schools. Numerous education-related Acts were passed throughout the twentieth century, but the most important in the history of science education in England was the Education Reform Act 1988 (see next subsection). Another act of importance to the development of science education below university level in England was the Education Act 1944. The 1944 Act's contribution was indirect though – it raised the compulsory school age to 15 (but made provisions for it to be raised to 16 at a future date, which happened in 1972 (which is still the case today)). By raising the school leaving age to 16, this formed the basis for creating a nationally organised science curriculum and education in England (see next subsection). However, the Education Act 1944 did not stipulate that science be taught. For university-level science education, two significant developments were the expansion of distance learning science courses and the introduction of the World Wide Web (via the Internet) into the delivery of science teaching (although this has also been adopted below university level).

==== Education Reform Act 1988 ====
This was the most important development in the history of science education in England. It was this Act that established the National Curriculum and made science compulsory across both secondary and primary schools (alongside maths and English). The 1988 Act in effect implemented the recommendation of the Taunton Committee made more than a century earlier. The Act also established the now familiar “key stages”.

=== 2000s ===
The most significant developments to the science curriculum and education in this period to date have been the expansion of the compulsory science content in the National Curriculum and the associated changes to its assessment. Another significant event was the passing of the Education and Skills Act 2008, which raised the education leaving age in England to 18. It is unclear whether this extension of compulsory education will result in more science learners as science is not compulsory after the age of 16—the school leaving age, which the 2008 Act did not alter.

== Compulsory science content and national assessments ==
=== Learning aims ===
Compulsory science content for publicly funded schools (state schools) is provided by the National Curriculum and generally applies to children between the ages of 5 and 16. These eleven years of compulsory education are divided by the state into four key stages: KS1, KS2, KS3, and KS4. Regardless of key stage, the National Curriculum states two overarching aims of science education:

- develop scientific knowledge and conceptual understanding through the specific disciplines of biology, chemistry and physics
- develop understanding of the nature, processes and methods of science through different types of science enquiries that help them to answer scientific questions about the world around them

A third aim is common to KS1–3:

- are equipped with the scientific knowledge required to understand the uses and implications of science, today and for the future.

But for KS4, the third aim is more detailed, and there is also a fourth aim:

- develop and learn to apply observational, practical, modelling, enquiry, problem-solving skills and mathematical skills, both in the laboratory, in the field and in other environments;
- develop their ability to evaluate claims based on science through critical analysis of the methodology, evidence and conclusions, both qualitatively and quantitatively.

The need for mathematical skills is stressed by the National Curriculum across all key stages, but more so at KS3 and KS4.

=== Pedagogical considerations ===
The National Curriculum for science is a spiral curriculum; it is tends to be prescriptive. Because of its spiral nature, this makes its learning essentially constructivist. These points are illustrated in the subsections that follow. In addition, the Science National Curriculum emphasises the need for active learning right from the child's earliest exposure to the curriculum. Research on the value of active learning has been demonstrated and published. Experimentation by the child is underscored in the curriculum accompanied by careful discussion of what was observed. Despite these positive features, it has been argued that evaluating the effectiveness of the National Curriculum on learning is difficult to answer.

=== State of science education in primary education ===
There is evidence that primary school pupils, that is, KS1 and KS2, in the UK get very little science education. The reason for this appears to be a lack of science expertise in primary schools. This has three implications: First, primary school pupils in state schools (that is, publicly funded schools) generally do not start getting regular science classes till KS3 (the first stage of secondary education). This leads to the second implication, in that there is likely to be a wide variation in pre-secondary school science knowledge among pupils at the start of KS3. And the third implication, as lack of science education does not appear to be an issue for pupils in prep schools (recall that prep schools are private or independent schools), it means that pupils that have done their primary education in state schools, wishing to transfer to independent schools at senior level, are likely to face a significant disadvantage when attempting the Science Common Entrance Examination (since the state primary school pupils would have done relatively little science unless supplemented by private tutorials).

=== KS1 ===
Key stage 1 (KS1) covers the first two years of compulsory school education in the National Curriculum. As such, the years are referred to as years 1 and 2. Children are typically in the age range 5–7. If a full science curriculum is offered as prescribed by the National Curriculum, then the emphasis of science at this stage should be observation and describing or drawing things that the child can see, either around them or from a book or photograph or video; the feel of materials is also an important feature of KS1 science. Abstract concepts in science are not introduced at this stage (at least not on the basis of the National Curriculum). As a result, the science curriculum at KS1 should be more or less plants and animals, and materials, with the emphasis on what can easily be seen or described by feeling things.

=== KS2 (including SATs, 11+ CEs, and teacher assessments) ===
Key stage 2 (KS2) covers years 3, 4, 5 and 6 of compulsory school education in the National Curriculum. It is the longest stage of compulsory school education in England. Children are typically in the age range 7–11. The National Curriculum divides KS2 into lower KS2 (years 3 and 4) and upper KS2 (years 5 and 6). If a full science curriculum is offered as prescribed by the National Curriculum then year 3 should continue from KS1, but with more complex observations for the child to do on plants and animals, and materials—rocks, fossils and soils, are brought in. Setting up simple experiments and recording data should become increasingly important at this stage. Hazards and dangers of certain scientific experiments (such as feeling things after they have been heated) should be drilled into pupils; necessary precautions against such dangers/hazards are taught. New areas should be introduced: light (and the dangers of looking directly at sunlight with necessary precautions), forces and magnets. In year 4, classification of living and non-living things come to the fore; additional areas introduced include:

- Environmental change
- Digestive system and food chains
- States of matter
- Sound
- Electricity

In years 5 and 6 (upper KS2), the National Curriculum states that the emphasis should be on enabling pupils develop a deeper understanding of scientific ideas. The need to read, spell and pronounce scientific vocabulary correctly is emphasised by the National Curriculum. This emphasis probably reflects the fact that by the age of 9, 10, or 11, a child in England should be able to read and write properly. Year 5 should continue on from year 4, studying increasingly more complex aspects of what was introduced in year 4. Also, the pupil should start learning to accept or refute ideas based on scientific evidence. Additional areas should include:

- Life cycles
- Reproduction in some plants and animals
- Growing old
- Properties and changes of materials
- Earth and space

Year 6 not only continues on from year 5, adding more complex aspects of what was learnt in year 5, but should also prepare the pupil for KS3 science; additional areas include:

- Circulatory system
- Drugs and lifestyle
- Evolution and inheritance

==== SATs and teacher assessments ====
Between the early 1990s and early 2010s, state school pupils had to take statutory SAT exams at the end of KS2 science although teacher assessments were also allowed. The KS2 SAT science exam consisted of two papers (forty-five minutes each). The scores from both papers were combined to give a final score. This score would then be converted into a numerical level, which would in turn be converted into an expectation level. The conversion scale for the levels at KS2 SAT science is shown in the table below.

Science KS2 SATs
Mark range	Numerical level	Expectation level
0–19	N/1	Below expectations
20–22	2	Below expectations
23–39	3	Below expectations
40–60	4	At expected level
61–80	5	Beyond expectations

Level 6 (exceptional) was also available, but only in mathematics and English (reading); a separate test for level 6 assessment had to be taken, which had to be marked externally. Science KS2 SATs were discontinued in 2013 and replaced by teacher assessments (which were already allowed during the time of SATs). In addition to teacher assessments, a SAT replacement assessment called key stage 2 science sampling test is now offered to five randomly selected pupils in a school every two years. The test comprises three papers: ‘b’ for biology, ‘c’ for chemistry, and ‘p’ for physics (each twenty-five minutes). The aim of the tests is to assess how well children are getting on with the curriculum. The first test of this kind was in the summer of 2016.

==== 11+ CEs (Common Entrance Examination) ====
This exam is run by the Independent Schools Examinations Board and is taken by prep school pupils wishing to be admitted into senior schools (although not all senior schools admit 11-year-olds). Some state school pupils in KS2 use the exam to make the transition into an independent (senior) school. The syllabus for the 11+ CE science exam is based on the National Curriculum for KS2 science; one paper for science (one hour) is taken. In addition to the examinable syllabus for the 11+ CE, there is also prep-KS3 science material for the pupil to cover; this prep-KS3 science material is not examinable but is required as preparation for KS3 science study in senior school if admitted.

=== The ‘traditional’ three sciences for KS3 and KS4 ===
The National Curriculum for KS3–4 science differs from KS1–2, not just in its complexity, but unlike the latter, the science curriculum is divided into three explicit parts: biology, chemistry, and physics. Typically, in a state secondary school, each science will have a dedicated teacher who is a specialist in the subject, but it is not unusual for a school or college to recruit a teacher that can deliver two or even all three sciences (depending on the breadth of knowledge of the teacher and staff resources of the school). Recall that for many, if not most, entrants to state secondary schools, KS3 will be the first stage at which they get regular science education. Below is a broad summary of the curriculum of each part at KS3/4 level, simplified for the purposes of this article into KS3/4 core areas.

==== Biology ====
Defined in the National Curriculum as:

... the science of living organisms (including animals, plants, fungi and microorganisms) and their interactions with each other and the environment.

The content for KS3/4 biology in the National Curriculum can be divided into the following core areas:

- Cell biology and organisation
- Organ systems of animals and plants
- Biochemistry
- Health, diseases, and medicines
- Bioenergetics
- Ecosystem
- Genetics and inheritance
- Variation and evolution

==== Chemistry ====
Defined in the National Curriculum as:

... the science of the composition, structure, properties and reactions of matter, understood in terms of atoms, atomic particles and the way they are arranged and link together.

The content for KS3/4 chemistry in the National Curriculum can be divided into the following core areas:

- Atoms and the particulate nature of matter
- The periodic table and periodicity
- Properties of matter
- Chemical reactions and changes
- Chemical analyses
- Chemical energetics
- Uses of matter (natural and synthetic)
- Earth and atmosphere

==== Physics ====
Defined in the National Curriculum as:

... the science of the fundamental concepts of field, force, radiation and particle structures, which are inter-linked to form unified models of the behaviour of the material universe.

The content for KS3/4 physics in the National Curriculum can be divided into the following core areas:

- Energy and thermodynamics
- Physical nature of matter
- Particle model of matter
- Atomic structure and radioactivity
- Electricity, magnetism and electromagnetism
- Mechanics
- Waves and optics
- Space physics and astrophysics

The above 'KS3/4 core areas' will form the bases of outlining science education at levels higher than KS4 later on in the article.

=== KS3 (including SATs, 13+ CEs, and teacher assessments) ===
Key stage 3 (KS3) covers years 7, 8 and 9 of compulsory school education in the National Curriculum. Pupils are typically in the age range 11–14.

==== SATs and teacher assessments ====
Between the early 1990s and late 2000s (‘late noughties’), state school pupils had to take statutory SAT exams at the end of KS3 science (just like KS2) although teacher assessments were also allowed. The KS3 SAT science exam consisted of two papers (one hour each). The scores from both papers were combined to give a final score. This score would then be converted into a numerical level, which would in turn be converted into an expectation level. The conversion scale for the levels at KS3 SAT is shown below.

Numerical level	Expectation level
1	Below expectations
2	Below expectations
3	Below expectations
4	Below expectations
5	At expected level
6	At expected level
7	Beyond expectations
8	Exceptional

The conversion of the raw score from the two papers to a numerical level depended on the ‘tier’ taken by the student. For science KS3 SATs, two tiers were available: lower tier and higher tier. Levels 3–6 were available at the lower tier while levels 5–7 were available at the higher tier. The conversion scale for each tier's scores are shown below.

Science KS3 SATs: lower tier
Mark range	Numerical level	Expectation level
0–32	N	Below expectations
33–39	2	Below expectations
40–68	3	Below expectations
69–102	4	Below expectations
103–133	5	At expected level
134–180	6	At expected level

Science KS3 SATs: higher tier
Mark range	Numerical level	Expectation level
0–41	N	Below expectations
42–47	4	Below expectations
48–77	5	At expected level
78–105	6	At expected level
106–150	7	Beyond expectations

Level 8 (exceptional) was not available to science KS3 SATs (not even at the higher tier); it was available to mathematics, but only at the highest tier (levels 6–8) out of four tiers that were available to mathematics KS3 SATs. Science KS3 SATs were discontinued in 2010 and replaced by teacher assessments (just like science KS2 SATs). Despite the discontinuation of statutory science KS3 SATs, the past papers are still used by schools today.

==== 13+ CEs (Common Entrance Examination) ====
Like the 11+ CEs, the 13+ CEs are taken by prep school pupils wishing to be admitted to independent senior schools; some senior schools only admit from the age of 13. The examination provides an opportunity for some KS3 state school pupils to make the transition into an independent school. The syllabus for the 13+ CE science exam(s) is based on the National Curriculum for KS3 science, although not all of the KS3 science content is examinable in the CE, but the parts left out are recommended for teaching in year 9. For the exam, the candidate can take either the simpler one paper in science (one hour) comprising biology, chemistry and physics parts, or three higher (and harder) papers (forty minutes each)—one in biology, one in chemistry, and one in physics. In addition, individual senior schools may have exams for entry into other years; for example, 14+, 16+ (for post-16 or ‘KS5’ study); details of which they give on their websites.

=== KS4 (including GCSEs and IGCSEs) ===
Key stage 4 (KS4) covers years 10 and 11 of compulsory school education, and pupils are typically in the age range 14–16. At the end of KS4, students in English schools usually take GCSE or IGCSE exams.

==== Overview of GCSE sciences ====
GCSE science can be taken at either foundation tier or higher tier. Although GCSEs are closely linked to KS4, schools actually start tackling the GCSE part of the National Curriculum from year 9 (KS3). This is certainly the case for mathematics and science, and it is because of the vastness of the content to be covered for the GCSEs in those subjects. In the past, there were several science GCSE routes, but following changes to GCSEs in the 2010s, the number of routes have simplified somewhat. Today, in most cases, science GCSE can be taken either as a combined single subject (which is worth two GCSE subjects—also known as combined science) or as the three separate subjects of physics, chemistry, and biology (each worth a single GCSE subject in its own right—also known as triple science). When biology, chemistry, and physics are taken as separate GCSE subjects, the tiers can be mixed. So, for instance, a student could take say, biology at higher tier but chemistry at foundation tier. By contrast, tiers cannot be mixed in combined science (that is, all constituent parts must be taken at the same tier). Experiments (also called practicals) are compulsory in the GCSE science course, but in different ways across the boards offering GCSE science to English schools. For most boards, the results of the practicals do not count towards the final grade in the reformed GCSE (as this is determined entirely by the results of the written examination), but the school/college must submit a signed practical science statement to the board under which the science is being studied BEFORE the students can take the examination. The statement must declare that all students have completed all the required practicals. The skills and knowledge that should have been acquired from the practicals are subsequently assessed in the GCSE exams, which for most boards are entirely written (as alluded to earlier). For one board (CCEA), however, in addition to the examination of practical skills in the written papers, the results of some of the actual practicals do count towards the final grade in the reformed GCSE. Currently, GCSE sciences in England are available from five boards: AQA, OCR, Edexcel. WJEC-Eduqas, and CCEA. Although all five boards provide GCSE science to English schools, not all of these boards are based in England: AQA, OCR, and Edexcel are based in England, but WJEC-Eduqas is based in Wales while CCEA is based in Northern Ireland. Schools are free to choose any board for their science, and where the three sciences of chemistry, physics, and biology are being taken independently at GCSE level, all three sciences need not be taken from the same board.

==== Outline of GCSE science routes ====
For GCSE sciences, following changes in the mid-2010s, a student can go for either combined science or triple science. Within each science route, in some cases, there is the possibility of taking either a trilogy or synergy course. In trilogy, science is delivered in the three traditional parts of biology, chemistry, and physics, but in synergy, science is delivered through the prism of scenarios and contexts. Only one board (AQA) offers synergy and trilogy, and only for combined science. The structure and time duration of the GCSE science examinations is not universal across the boards, but one thing that is universal is that the content for each science in triple science is significantly greater than in combined science.

==== AQA ====
AQA offers both combined and triple science, but as alluded to earlier, only combined science can be studied as a synergy or trilogy course. In trilogy, the candidate takes two papers per science (so six in total). In synergy, the candidate takes two science groups: (i) life and environmental sciences; and (ii) physical sciences; in each group, two papers are taken (so four in total). Regardless of the route, each paper is 1 hour and 45 minutes.

==== Edexcel ====
For GCSE, Edexcel offers both combined and triple science but only trilogy courses for both. The number of papers and time duration for each paper are identical to AQA trilogy.

==== OCR ====
OCR offers both combined and triple science but only trilogy courses for both. However, there are two trilogy courses: 'A' and 'B'. In 'A', the science is delivered through the traditional topics, but in 'B', the delivery is context-based, so, in a way, a synergy implementation of a trilogy course. The number of papers and time duration for each paper are identical to AQA trilogy.

==== WJEC-Eduqas ====
For GCSE science in England, WJEC-Eduqas offers both combined and triple science but only trilogy courses for both. The number of papers for each paper are identical to AQA, but the time duration for each paper is significantly longer at 2 hours and 15 minutes.

==== CCEA ====
CCEA provides the widest and most extensive GCSE science examinations; three routes are offered: single science, double science, and triple science. Only trilogy courses are available. For single science, one 1-hour paper each is offered for biology, chemistry, and physics, and one 2-hour paper is provided for the practical science exam, so in total, four papers. For double science, the candidate sits three papers each for biology, chemistry, and physics, but in each science, Paper 1 is 1 hour; Paper 2 is 1 hour and 15 minutes; and Paper 3 is a 1-hour practical examination (so nine papers in total). And for triple science, the candidate also undertakes nine papers, but the time durations are longer: Papers 1 and 2 are 1 hour and 15 minutes each at foundation tier and 1 hour and 30 minutes each at higher tier. And Paper 3, which is the practical exam, is 1 hour and 15 minutes.

==== Changes to GCSE science and its grading system ====
As alluded to earlier, in the mid-2010s, the GCSE science courses of the GCSE exam boards underwent significant changes. This was in part due to changes in the National Curriculum, of which one of the areas affected the most was key stage 4 (KS4). The revised version of the National Curriculum covered more content; the one for KS4 science was first published in December 2014 and a version specifically for GCSE combined science was first published in June 2015, and first implemented in September 2016. The increased content triggered a change in the GCSE grading system from A*–G to 9–1. Much more detail on the 9–1 grading system and how it differs from A*–G can be read here.

==== Overview of IGCSE science routes ====
This variant of GCSEs, as the name suggests, is geared towards international students (that is, students from outside the UK) although it is offered by many private schools in England. IGCSEs are equivalent in value to GCSEs and although state schools can offer IGCSEs, many choose not to because IGCSE results are not eligible for inclusion into school league tables. In England, two boards offer IGCSEs for science, Edexcel and CIE.

==== CIE (formerly CAIE) ====
CIE IGCSEs can be undertaken at either core or extended levels. The two levels are somewhat equivalent (although not necessarily identical) to GCSE foundation and higher tiers respectively. Regardless of level, three routes are available for CIE IGCSE sciences: combined, co-ordinated, and triple science. CIE's 'combined' science is equivalent to CCEA's single science; 'co-ordinated' science is equivalent to GCSE's combined science and CCEA's double science. For CIE combined science, the candidate sits three papers in total, and in each paper, biology, chemistry, and physics are on the same paper; the same thing goes for CIE co-ordinated science. Looking at the paper schedule, for core and combined, the candidate sits:

- Paper 1, which is 45 minutes
- Paper 3, which is 1 hour and 15 minutes
- Paper 5, which is a practical exam and is 1 hour and 15 minutes, or Paper 6, which is 1 hour

For extended and combined, the candidate sits:

- Paper 2, which is 45 minutes
- Paper 4, which is 1 hour and 15 minutes
- Paper 5, the practical exam of 1 hour and 15 minutes, or Paper 6, 1 hour

For core and co-ordinated, the candidate sits:

- Paper 1, which is 45 minutes
- Paper 3, which is 2 hours
- Paper 5, the practical exam, is 2 hours, or Paper 6, which is 1 hour and 30 minutes

For extended and co-ordinated, the candidate sits:

- Paper 2, which is 45 minutes
- Paper 4, which is 2 hours
- Paper 5 (practical exam), which is 2 hours, or Paper 6, which is 1 hour and 30 minutes

For triple science, the candidate sits three papers per science, so nine papers in total for all three sciences. Looking at the paper schedule for each science, for core and triple, per science, the candidate sits:

- Paper 1, which is 45 minutes
- Paper 3, which is 1 hour and 15 minutes
- Paper 5 (practical exam), which is 1 hour and 15 minutes, or Paper 6, which is 1 hour

And for extended and triple, per science, the candidate sits:

- Paper 2, which is 45 minutes
- Paper 4, which is 1 hour and 15 minutes
- Paper 5 (practical exam), which is 1 hour and 15 minutes, or Paper 6, which is 1 hour

==== Edexcel IGCSEs ====
Edexcel IGCSE sciences offer three routes, single, double, and triple science (just like CCEA GCSE sciences), but only one tier is available for each route. For single science, the candidate sits one paper for each science at 1 hour and 10 minutes per paper, so three in total. For double science, the candidate also sits one paper for each science at 2 hours per paper, so three in total. And for triple science, the candidate sits two papers per science: Paper 1 is 2 hours, and Paper 2 is 1 hour and 15 minutes, so six in total.

== Science education post-16 or ‘KS5’ ==
For the ages of 16, 17 and 18 (and older for those that remain in education below university level), students in England do what is sometimes loosely called ‘key stage 5’ or KS5; it has no legal meaning (unlike the other key stages). And unlike KS1–4 in which the levels of complexity of topics learnt at each stage are prescribed within relatively narrow limits, at KS5, the levels of complexity of topics cover a wide range, although the highest level of complexity at KS5 is RQF level 3. Whether or not a student actually studies at this level of complexity in KS5 depends on their GCSE results. Crucially, on what subjects the student obtained passes at RQF level 2 standard (including mathematics and English) as well as the actual grades themselves. In other words, unlike KS1–4, where a specific student studies at one RQF level, at KS5, a specific student may be studying at several RQF levels depending on what the student obtained at GCSEs. Regardless of the RQF-level mix, KS5 students can complete post-16 study in one of the following:

- School with a sixth form
- Stand-alone sixth form college
- Further education college
- Apprenticeship
- Traineeship

KS5 study can be done either full-time or part-time. If done part-time, the student also has to be working or volunteering for at least 20 hours a week. The science curriculum and education at KS5 is highly varied, often disparate and tends to be specialised such that students no longer have to study all three sciences, but rather, select only those sciences considered important for their planned careers. If the student's GCSE results are not considered robust enough for RQF level 3 study of their chosen subject, the student may be required to undertake (or resit) one or two relevant subjects at RQF level 2 before undertaking study of the subject at RQF level 3. If the student is studying their chosen subject at RQF level 3, the level of depth of study required of the subject depends on the course being undertaken.

=== A-levels ===
A-levels are probably the highest profile KS5 studies in England, and contain the most content, taking two years to complete – the first year is called AS level and the second year is called A2. Like GCSEs, A levels were also reformed and until that happened, the now discontinued Cambridge Pre-Us offered the most content. Individual A-levels in chemistry, biology, and physics build on the core areas covered at KS3–4 but at a significantly more advanced level. A-level students are also introduced to areas that have developed from two or more KS3/4 core areas into highly complex fields in their own right. For instance, quantum mechanics, which A-level physics students study, developed from several KS3/4 core areas of physics, such as mechanics, waves, atomic structure, particle model of matter. This idea of studying areas that have developed from two or more KS3/4 core areas is taken much further at university level. It should be noted, however, that the Department for Education, which prescribes content for A-levels, does not include the KS3/4 core area of space physics and astrophysics in the A-level physics curriculum; hence, AQA makes this area optional, but OCR does not. It should also be added that the Department for Education includes psychology as a science; five core areas for study of the subject are specified:

- Cognitive
- Social
- Developmental
- Individual differences
- Biological

Typically, an A-level student may choose only one or two science subjects, and mix with mathematics or non-science A-level subjects. A comprehensive bank of A-level past exam papers (with time durations) in sciences from all A-level examination boards serving England can be found online. Grading can be read here.

=== Non-A-level routes ===
Although A-levels are probably the highest profile KS5 studies, there are other qualifications at RQF level 3. Examples include BTECs, IBs, AQAs (different non-A-level qualifications), OCRs (different non-A-level qualifications), NVQs, T Levels, university specific foundation year programmes (generally offered to students that have taken A levels, but not the correct ones—can also be offered to those that have failed their A-levels), Access to HEs (generally not available to students under 21). The make-up of their content can vary significantly from qualification to qualification and from college to college although their content is based on different parts of the A-level curriculum. Direct contact with the college offering the non-A-level qualification of interest is really the best way to ascertain the exact content of the qualification, as all colleges do not offer the same content for the same non-A-level qualification. Grading tends to be three levels: distinction, merit, pass. Grade boundaries are not uniform across these qualifications; more information on that is best found by visiting websites for the various boards offering the various qualifications, which can be searched for online.

=== Beyond KS5 ===
Most students taking KS5 study will either go to university or apply for apprenticeships. For those that apply to study science at university, they will either choose to study a science in much more detail, or opt for a vocational education. Some universities offer degree apprenticeships.

=== Adult returners to education ===
Beyond 18 years of age, students that have already either left or finished their formal education, but return at later times in their lives to study science (having decided they do not have the appropriate level of knowledge), can do so on their return at RQF level 3 or lower. The level the student returns at will depend on their pre-enrollment level of knowledge of science although science is generally not available below RQF level 1 (that is, the RQF entry (sub-1) level) to adult returners to education (but maths and English are). Typically, further education colleges admit adult returners although some universities may offer distance learning courses. Further education and distance learning courses are often the ways these mature students can access science courses long after they have left education. Just like students that have neither left nor previously finished their education, satisfactorily passing the summative assessment at RQF level 3 is the crucial gateway into university-level education (that is RQF level 4 and higher) in England. In addition to satisfactory passes in science subjects at RQF level 3, the learner also has to have passed mathematics and English at RQF level 2 standard (typically GCSEs or equivalent with minimum (or equivalent minimum) grades of 'C' or '4'); providers of university-level education give details on their websites.

== Science education at university level ==
Like post-16 or KS5, this is also highly varied, disparate and specialised, but more so, as a student may choose to study 'one' science, which they will subsequently study in depth for two or more years; the summative assessment leads to a degree, which for science in England today is typically RQF level 5, 6 or 7 (if it is level 5, the qualification is called a foundation degree). Such education will enable students market themselves as (specialist) scientists to employers or postgraduate science degree programmes although the choices available to the graduate are affected by the class of degree they achieve, and the RQF level reached. Recruiters give details on their websites.

=== Bachelor's level ===
A bachelor's degree is the first level a student must attain before they can be described as a graduate; it is an RQF level 6 qualification (although bachelor degrees in medicine, dentistry, veterinary medicine are RQF level 7). That means that foundation degree graduates (RQF level 5) will have to 'top-up' to a full degree before they can be referred to as graduates. Undergraduate university-level science education continues to build on the core and derived areas covered at KS3–5, but at a substantially more advanced level. Students studying bachelor degrees in the traditional sciences of physics, biology, and chemistry will typically study all KS3/4 core areas and their derived areas for their respective sciences in great detail. Also, students get the opportunity to study bachelor degrees in subjects that have developed from the core and derived areas of the three sciences to become independent subjects in their own right. For example, geology developed from several KS3/4 core areas of chemistry and physics; molecular biology developed from biochemistry and genetics, which are two KS3/4 core areas of biology; organic chemistry developed from several KS3/4 core areas of chemistry; astronomy is generally considered to be a branch of physics, but it is also an ancient science in its own right. It is even possible for a student to study one of the KS3/4 core areas as a bachelor's degree; for instance, a student could do a degree in biochemistry. Not all undergraduate students studying science study for science degrees; many will study science as part of a vocational degree, such as engineering, pharmacy, medicine, dentistry, nursing, veterinary medicine, allied health professions, and so on. And some will study science as part of a higher/degree apprenticeship. In such cases, the student will generally tend to study the parts of the traditional sciences that are relevant to their vocation or apprenticeship. For example, after the 'premedical' stage, medical students in English universities study several KS3/4 core and derived areas of biology in depth, but in most cases, this is only where they relate to humans; very little relating to other animals and nothing relating to plants are covered. Experiments (practicals), which have been important to the science curriculum since KS1, can be quite extensive at university level, and by the time of the dissertation project, the student may well be doing complex experiments lasting weeks or months unsupervised (although they will still have a supervisor on hand). Bachelor science degrees in England are offered by both universities and some further education colleges.

University-level teachers (also referred to in England as lecturers) will typically teach one topic of the science the student is studying, but two notable differences between university-level science education in further education colleges and universities are that in universities, there is a close connection between teaching and research. In other words, it is common for a university teacher to be a researcher in the area they teach—this applies not just to science, but to all areas; such connection between teaching and research does not occur in further education colleges in England. And the other difference is that further education colleges must have their degrees approved by universities. Although universities do not need approval for their science degrees and are free to set their own content, they generally get many of their science courses accredited by professional bodies. So, for example, universities offering biology degrees commonly get these programmes accredited by the Royal Society of Biology; for chemistry degrees, it is the Royal Society of Chemistry; for physics degrees, it is the Institute of Physics; for geology degrees, it is the Geological Society, and so on. Accreditation of a science degree by a professional body is a precondition if the student studying the degree wishes to become a member of the body following graduation, and subsequently acquire chartered status. In addition, UK universities are obliged to ensure that their degrees meet the standards agreed to in the Bologna Process to which the UK is a co-signatory. The QAA certifies those British degrees that meet those standards.

=== Master's level ===
A master's degree is the next level after a bachelor's degree; it is an RQF level 7 qualification. In England, it is actually possible to combine a master's with a bachelor's degree—these are called integrated degrees. It is, however, common for students to do bachelor's and master's as separate degrees in England. Master's degree science education tends to be highly focused on one or two of the core or derived areas covered at KS3–5 and the bachelor's degree, and it is even possible to study a 'derived from a derived' field. For example, structural biology developed from molecular biology, which in turn developed from the biology KS3/4 core areas of biochemistry and genetics; solid-state physics developed from several K3/4 core areas of physics, but it also developed from quantum mechanics, which itself developed from several physics KS3/4 core areas. As mentioned earlier, there are opportunities for a student to study one core area for their bachelor's degree, for instance, a biochemistry bachelor's degree, but it is really at the master's level that true specialisation begins. The initial stages of many (but not all) master degree programmes require attendance to classroom lessons and even exams, but the later stages will be entirely research-based.

=== Doctorate level ===
A doctorate degree occupies the highest level of education covered by the national qualifications frameworks in the UK, at RQF level 8 (there are higher qualifications, but they are not covered by the frameworks). In England, it is possible to enter a doctorate course with just a bachelor's degree (the student would typically require a first or upper second class honours for such direct route); however, more commonly, a student would require a master's. In England, it is not uncommon for a student to be initially admitted to the doctorate at master's level (such as an MPhil), but then after two or so years, be promoted to the doctorate proper pending a satisfactory defence of their research findings in a transfer report in an examination (which can be oral). At the start of a doctorate programme in England, there may be some initial attendance at lessons, but the bulk of study in a doctorate degree course will be research-based. When it comes to science education at doctorate level, the emphasis is on advancing knowledge rather than mastering knowledge that is already known. Trying to unravel knowledge that has not already been unravelled by someone else somewhere in the world can be challenging (although AI may make the research easier today). The student must have a good general knowledge of their chosen topic or subtopic of science and identify where the gaps in the scientific community's understanding of that (sub)topic are. The selected 'hole' in the scientific community's understanding must be wide enough in scope for a doctorate but narrow enough in scope to enable a sufficiently detailed study within the period of the doctorate. The insight and guidance of the student's supervisor for the doctorate will be crucial for that initial assessment of the targeted gap in knowledge within the scientific community as well as determining when a satisfactory end-point has been reached. Even during the doctorate, the student will still need to be guided by the supervisor considerably, even at the later stages when the student will likely know more of the (sub)topic than the supervisor (certainly when it comes to the data collected). At the end of doctorate programme, the student must submit a thesis, which they will need to defend in a viva. Here, the student orally defends their work to a panel (typically of two examiners). If the thesis is finally accepted, a copy is typically kept in the university's library; in fact, the doctorate thesis is usually good enough for publication in an academic journal—at least in theory. Completion of the doctorate not only makes the holder an expert in their chosen (sub)topic of science (meaning they can teach their (sub)topic to master and bachelor degree students) but enables them conduct future research independently in their field. The same goes for all subjects and not just the sciences.

=== Post-doctorate level ===
A post-doctoral degree is usually awarded to an individual for a body of work published over a number of years. The body of work being recognised will typically be academic or research-related and the post-doctorate degree awarded by the university is entirely discretionary. When deciding whether to award the degree, the university will be assessing the impact the candidate's work has had, so in the case of science, the panel may be looking for evidence of any new beneficial technology (or technologies) to have emerged as a result of the candidate's work in science. Or perhaps, a change in government policy as a result of the candidate's work. Or maybe, confirmation of predictions the candidate's scientific work might have made. The quality of the publications is also taken into account. Because the award does not follow a period of formal study, it is not covered by the national qualifications frameworks, as alluded to earlier. That said, it is actually possible in England to be awarded a doctorate (which is covered by the frameworks) for a body of work (just like a post-doctorate), but the awarding of a doctorate this way (by publication) is relatively rare. It is also possible for a person to be awarded an honorary doctorate or post-doctorate. This is usually for the individual's philanthropic work, and it might be for providing funding for student doctorates or funding for underrepresented groups or even wider research funding.

=== Non-degree routes ===
In England, it is entirely possible to get university-level science education right up to RQF level 8 without obtaining a single degree. This is particularly so in some vocational fields such as engineering and health and social care. Such routes are often provided by further education colleges, and the content of university-level science education using non-degree routes are even more focussed on those KS3/4 core and derived areas relevant to the vocational field. The non-degree RQF level 8 course will tend to have a substantial research component in comparison to non-degree courses at RQF levels 4 to 7. Although qualifications using non-degree routes will have the same RQF levels as their degree counterparts, they will not necessarily be equivalent to their counterparts. For example, the Level 8 Professional Diploma in Environmental Engineering is not equivalent to a doctorate even though both are RQF level 8 qualifications.

== Challenges for science education in England ==
=== Pre-university level ===
The challenges of establishing a national curriculum for science below university level in England over the last two centuries have been explored by Smith (2010) and others. In Smith's paper, she highlighted two potentially conflicting roles for science education below university level: educating a public to be scientifically literate, and providing scientific training for aspiring science professionals. Smith further pointed out in her paper that even among the training of aspiring science professionals, three groups could be identified: those that sought science in pursuance of the truth and an abstract understanding of science; those that sought science for actual benefit to society—the applied scientists, and then the failures. The dilemma did not escape the committee led by J J Thomson (discoverer of the electron) in 1918, which is quite telling of the tension in trying to accommodate several very different groups of science learners:

In framing a course in Science for boys up to the age of 16 it should be recognised that for many this will be the main, for some the only, opportunity of obtaining a knowledge of Science, and that the course should therefore be self-contained, and designed so as to give special attention to those natural phenomena which are matters of everyday experience, in fine, that the Science taught in it should be kept as closely connected with human interests as possible.

(Report by Thomson Committee, 1918: p23)

Such tension has never really dissipated. In a report by the Royal Society from 2008, they state several challenges facing science education; the first two are reproduced here:

The first:

provide science and mathematics education appropriate for students of all levels of attainment in an environment where more students remain in education post-16;

and the second:

give a solid core grounding in science and mathematics to those who will probably not continue studying these subjects post-16;

(Report by the Royal Society, 2008: p17)

A lack of good quality teachers has also been cited as a challenge. Difficulty recruiting science teachers, which is a current problem in England (and the UK as a whole) is certainly not new as the following extract from the report by the Thomson Committee in 1918 shows:

The first and indispensable condition for any real improvement in the teaching of Science in schools of all kinds is that effective steps should be taken to secure an adequate supply of properly qualified teachers. The supply is inadequate for existing needs ...

(Report by Thomson Committee, 1918: p31)

==== Figures from the 1918 report ====
Some interesting figures were quoted in the 1918 report: for instance on page 31 of the report: out of 72 schools that had 200–400 girls of all ages, only 39 had the services of two science teachers (mistresses). The report went on state that these figures had contributed to long hours and inadequate salaries. This sounds strikingly similar to the situation facing science (and indeed all) school teachers in England today, more than a hundred years later. Another challenge was that there was not an appreciation by the political elite on the value of a science education to the wider public; even though England was producing some of the greatest scientists in the world. Yet another challenge was that public schools (historic private schools) were slow to respond to the needs of developing a science curriculum. For example, William Sharp was the first science teacher at Rugby School, a prestigious public school in England, which only happened for the first time in 1847, nearly 300 years after the school was established, and more than 100 years after England had lost one of the world's greatest scientists: Isaac Newton.

==== 20th century developments ====
Despite these challenges, a science curriculum and education developed through the 20th century, and eventually became a compulsory part of the new National Curriculum in 1988 (phased in from 1989 to 1992). Even at the time of the deliberations in the mid-1980s before the creation of the National Curriculum, there was disagreement over how much time science should occupy in the curriculum. There was pressure for science to be made to occupy 20% of curriculum time for 14–16-year-olds, but not everyone agreed with this, certainly not the then Secretary of State for Education and Science, Kenneth Baker. The then Department for Education and Science settled for 12.5% of curriculum time, but schools were free to increase this. The result was the emergence of:

- single science (which occupied 10% of curriculum time and was the minimum requirement—also called core science),
- double science (which occupied 20% of curriculum time, and was so called because it involved studying core science and additional science)
- the option to teach physics, chemistry, and biology separately (also known as 'triple' science).

==== 21st century developments ====
Following the changes to the National Curriculum in the 2010s, single science has effectively been removed from most GCSE specifications, and the two components of double science have been combined to form "combined science", which is now the minimum requirement although CCEA GCSE still retains single and double science. As for IGCSEs, the National Curriculum was never designed for them; hence, IGCSEs (like CCEA GCSEs) still retain the single and double (or their respective alternative) categories of science.

==== Addressing the shortages ====
One challenge that ties in with England's shortage of science teachers is the number of science undergraduates in higher education, which provides the pool for future trainee science teachers, but undergraduate numbers affect the three sciences differently: In 2023–24, 42150 students in England enrolled for physical science degrees in higher education, which was a little under half the number that enrolled for biological science degrees in England, which was 80085. The number for biological sciences does not include students that studied biology as part of the vocational degrees they enrolled for, with medicine, veterinary medicine, psychology, and subjects allied to medicine making up 440430 enrolments in England alone in 2023–24. This dwarfs enrolments for physical sciences, even when engineering and technology enrolments are taken into account, which amounted to 90870 in England in 2023–24. The table below provides figures for all nations of the UK (including England), and enrolment of students from the rest of the world.

Higher education enrolments in the UK across sciences and related courses in 2023–24 (Source: HESA)
Course	England	Wales	Scotland	Northern Ireland	Other UK	Non-UK	Not known	Total
Physical sciences	42510	2095	5095	1255	170	13935	50	65100
Engineering and technology	90870	5695	12695	3775	370	65190	425	179015
Biological and sport sciences	80085	5525	8660	2660	365	17585	330	115205
Medicine and dentistry	58545	2930	6605	2425	215	14655	135	85510
Subjects allied to medicine	268850	15545	27605	10655	765	41735	695	365850
Psychology	104620	6890	8905	2440	375	16590	140	139965
Veterinary sciences	8415	620	1015	355	50	2425	5	12880

The popularity of the biological sciences (as well as the courses they feature heavily in) over the physical sciences (and the courses they feature heavily in) has been the case for more than a decade (certainly before this article was first written, which was in 2017). This has had a direct impact on government policy in England: for example, the UK government offers bursaries of £29000 to graduates wishing to train as physics or chemistry teachers in secondary schools in England, but £26000 for those who wish to become biology teachers. To further encourage chemistry and physics teacher training, the Royal Society of Chemistry and Institute of Physics offer scholarships of £31000 to trainee chemistry and physics teachers (as alternatives to bursaries), but the eligibility criteria are not identical (even when the difference in subjects are taken into account). The government has also implemented a policy to increase the number of science graduates from UK universities: normally, a student in England wishing to study for a first degree including an honours degree can get a UK-government-backed student loan as long as they do not already possess an honours degree. Exceptions are permitted, but prior to September 2017 (and in the case of postgraduate master's degrees, September 2016), these UK-government-backed loans for those in England that already had honours degrees were only available for them if the courses they were going to study led to professional qualifications such as medicine, dentistry, social care, architecture or teaching. However, the range of subjects for which a student in England already in possession of an honours degree could get a second UK-government-backed student loan to study a second honours degree was expanded to include science subjects (as well as technology, engineering and mathematics), which took effect from 1 September 2017. As before, the student has to meet both England and UK residency requirements. The inclusion of science, technology, engineering and mathematics subjects ("STEM") to the list appears to have been triggered not just by teacher shortages in those subjects, but also by a general skills shortage (in those subjects) UK-wide. It remains to be seen whether the direct interventions by the UK government will help alleviate the general skills shortages in STEM subjects, as well as the challenges of delivering a science curriculum and education in the long term.

=== University level ===
As for science at university level in England, the specialised (and individualised) nature of study at this tertiary level means that a discussion on developing a national curriculum for university science education has never really taken hold. Instead, the challenges of science education at this level in England (and indeed across the world) have revolved, and still revolve, around the acts of establishing and maintaining one in the first place rather than harmonising content across all university courses. The prevailing politics or government and social norms could be issues for university science education; for example, the priorities of the Early Middle Ages (also known as the Dark Ages) following the collapse of the Western Roman Empire could have been challenges to the development of university science (in England), as could have been the attitudes and beliefs of the same period. In England, although university science education started hundreds of years after pre-university science education, the former eventually prospered in comparison to the latter.

Nevertheless, the threat of closure of a university science department cannot be dismissed: for instance, the Physics Department at Birkbeck, University of London closed in 1997. Another closure was the Chemistry Department at Exeter University in 2005, which the Royal Society of Chemistry criticised. The chemistry department's closure generated intense news coverage, as well as anxiety in other departments and courses in the university, such as geography, and there was also the abuse the university's vice-chancellor received. Commenting on the department's closure, Hodges (2006) alluded to one brutal reality of a university science department's purpose: unlike a school science department, a university science department must not just teach science to its students (as important as that is) but also actively bring in money, via research grants and otherwise (and lots of it). This influences whether a university keeps a science department (which is expensive to run) open or not. Put another way, a school or other pre-university level science department (even one offering science degrees) can survive on a large enough number of students doing its subject and the pass rate of those students, but not a university science department, which also needs to attract a lot of research money. This disparity in the ways a university and a pre-university institution decides whether or not to run a science department might explain why pre-university institutions such as further education colleges offer biology degrees (or foundation degrees) but rarely (if any) chemistry or physics degrees since fewer students study these. Details of universities and further education colleges in England and the rest of the UK offering science degrees can be found on the UCAS website.

But attracting research money to a university science department is a whole quagmire in itself. In addition, several challenges to university science education that link into the issue of university science department survival have been identified by Grove (2015); these challenges are summarised below:

- Operating in a global market
- Rising student expectations (as a result of the increased loans students in England have to take to pay their increased tuition fees)
- Increasing costs and shifting funding (as the UK government provides less grants and students take on additional loans (on top of the increased tuition fee loans) to compensate)
- A demand and need for new technologies
- Linking estates, strategy and the student (specific recent examples can be seen in publications from Cambridge and Greenwich universities)
- Attracting and retaining the best talent
- Making research sustainable

These challenges apply not just to the university provision of science education, but to all areas of university education.

== See also ==
- Science Learning Centres
