= Advanced level mathematics =

Educational qualification in the UK

Advanced Level (A-Level) Mathematics is a post-16 qualification taken in England, Wales and Northern Ireland (and occasionally other countries as well). In the UK, A-Level exams are traditionally taken by 17-18 year-olds after a two-year course at a sixth form or college. Advanced Level Further Mathematics is often taken by students who wish to study a mathematics-based degree at university, or related degree courses such as physics or computer science.

Like other A-Level subjects, mathematics is assessed by examination at the end of the course. The syllabus seeks to develop skills in mathematical modelling, problem-solving, mathematical argument including mathematical language, and data analysis. It came to be regarded as one of the most beneficial A-Level subjects after the Russell Group of research-intensive universities in the United Kingdom published guidance for applicants in 2011 on their preferred A-Levels to prepare candidates for degree-level study at their institutions. Mathematics featured prominently in their list of A-Levels, which they described as "facilitating subjects". The Russell Group replaced its guidance with a new website in 2019, after a backlash led by the creative industries and criticism that it was unhelpful to disadvantaged applicants. But the impression that mathematics A-Level is respected and favoured by selective universities and employers has persisted. Mathematics became the most popular A-Level subject by number of entries in 2014, overtaking English literature, and remained so for the next 12 years.

The linear structure and content were introduced for first teaching in September 2017, as part of far-reaching reforms to A-Levels and GCSEs introduced by Michael Gove during his tenure as Secretary of State for Education from 2010 to 2014. These reforms replaced the modular system of assessment introduced in Curriculum 2000, whereby these qualifications were taught in modules, typically a total six of which three were taught in each year, with examinations after each whose results contributed to an overall final grade. The Gove changes also decoupled the AS-level qualification from A-levels, making AS levels a qualification in their own right.

== Specification ==
There are three papers which must all be taken in the same year. There are three overarching themes - “Argument, language and proof”, “Problem solving” and “Modelling” throughout the assessment.

Each board structures the three papers as follows:

=== AQA ===
- Paper 1: Pure Mathematics
- Paper 2: Content on Paper 1 plus Mechanics
- Paper 3: Content on Paper 1 plus Statistics

=== Edexcel ===
- Paper 1: Pure Mathematics 1
- Paper 2: Pure Mathematics 2
- Paper 3: Statistics and Mechanics

=== OCR A ===
- Paper 1: Pure Mathematics
- Paper 2: Pure Mathematics and Statistics
- Paper 3: Pure Mathematics and Mechanics

=== OCR B (MEI) ===
- Paper 1: Pure Mathematics and Mechanics
- Paper 2: Pure Mathematics and Statistics
- Paper 3: Pure Mathematics and Comprehension

== Grading ==
It was suggested by the Department for Education that the high proportion of candidates who obtain grade A makes it difficult for universities to distinguish between the most able candidates. As a result, the 2010 exam session introduced the grade A*—which serves to distinguish between the better candidates.

Prior to the 2017 reforms, the A* grade in maths was awarded to candidates who achieved an A (480/600) in their overall A Level, as well as achieving a combined score of 180/200 in modules Core 3 and Core 4. For the reformed specification, the A* is given by a more traditional grade boundary based on the raw mark achieved by the candidate over their papers.

== List of subjects ==
1. Core Mathematics:

Covers foundational topics like algebra, calculus, trigonometry, and coordinate geometry.

2. Further Mathematics:

Expands upon Core Mathematics with additional areas such as complex numbers, matrices, differential equations, and numerical methods.

3. Pure Mathematics:

Explores advanced topics in algebra, calculus, and mathematical proofs.

4. Applied Mathematics:

Focuses on practical applications of mathematical concepts to solve real-world problems in various fields.

5. Mechanics:

Focuses on the study of motion, forces, and vectors, particularly relevant for physics or engineering interests.

6. Statistics:

Involves collecting, analysing, and interpreting data, including topics like probability, hypothesis testing, regression analysis, and sampling.

7. Discrete Mathematics:

Deals with separate and distinct mathematical structures, including topics such as combinatorics, graph theory, and algorithms.

8. Decision Mathematics:

Applies mathematical techniques to solve real-world problems related to optimisation, networks, and decision-making.

9. Financial Mathematics:

Applies mathematical concepts to analyse financial markets, investments, and risk management.

=== Further mathematics ===
Not all schools are able to offer Further Mathematics, due to a low student number (meaning that the course is not financially viable) or a lack of suitably experienced teachers. To fulfil the demand, extra tutoring is available, with providers such as the Further Mathematics Support Programme.

=== Results ===
The proportion of candidates in England, Wales and Northern Ireland acquiring these grades in 2025 are below, presented as cumulative percentages.

=== Mathematics ===
Entries	112,138
Grade A*	16.7%
Grades A*-A	41.7%
Grades A*-B	61.6%
Grades A*-C	78.2%
Grades A*-D	90.0%
Grades A*-E	96.5%
Grades A*-U	100.0%

=== Further mathematics ===
Entries	19,390
Grade A*	28.9%
Grades A*-A	58.2%
Grades A*-B	78.8%
Grades A*-C	89.6%
Grades A*-D	95.2%
Grades A*-E	98.1%
Grades A*-U	100.0%

== 2000s specification ==
Prior to the 2017 reform, the basic A-Level course consisted of six modules, four pure modules (C1, C2, C3, and C4) and two applied modules in Statistics, Mechanics and/or Decision Mathematics. The C1 through C4 modules are referred to by A-level textbooks as "Core" modules, encompassing the major topics of mathematics such as logarithms, differentiation/integration and geometric/arithmetic progressions.

The two chosen modules for the final two parts of the A-Level were determined either by a student's personal choices, or the course choice of their school/college, though it commonly took the form of S1 (Statistics) and M1 (Mechanics).
