= Hexagon Tower =

Science and technology facility in Manchester, England

- Hexagon Tower following completion of a cladding project.

- Location within Greater Manchester
- Former names: Hexagon House

General information
- Type: Chemical Research and Development Centre
- Architectural style: Brutalist
- Location: Blackley, Manchester, England
- Coordinates: 53.5221°N 2.22577°W
- Elevation: 90 m (295 ft)
- Construction started: 1970
- Completed: 1973
- Client: ICI Dyestuffs
- Owner: The Pioneer Group

Technical details
- Structural system: Steel
- Floor count: 13
- Floor area: 166,229 sq ft

Other information
- Number of restaurants: 1
- Facilities: Gym & restaurant

Hexagon Tower is a specialist science and technology facility located in Blackley, Manchester, England.

The site is a former Imperial Chemical Industries (ICI) research, development and production centre. Facilities at Blackley have played host to enterprises since 1785, before becoming an integral part of the British Dyestuffs Corporation after 1919 and then ICI in 1926.

Following a purchase in 2016, Hexagon Tower is now part of The Pioneer Group Network of UK science parks, managed by MAPP Property Management

== History ==
=== 1785–1926 ===
The site in which Hexagon Tower is located has a long industrial heritage. The first enterprise to locate in the area was the Borelle Dyeworks, established by French émigré Louis Borelle in 1785 to produce the Turkey red dye.

Following a period of decline, the site was taken over by another French expatriate, Angel Raphael Louis Delaunay, who arrived in the area at the turn of the 19th century to establish his own dyeing business in Blackley.

Following the death of Delaunay's son and heir Louis, German chemical entrepreneur Ivan Levinstein bought the dyeworks in 1865, leading to a period of commercial success for the site. Besides his dyeing business, Levinstein was also famed for opening the Sackville Street Building and founding Wrexham Lager.

In 1919, Levinstein's operation at Blackley merged with other chemical dyers to form the British Dyestuffs Corporation Limited, before becoming part of ICI in 1926.

=== ICI ownership ===
The ICI was founded in December 1926 from the merger of four companies: Brunner Mond, Nobel Explosives, the United Alkali Company, and British Dyestuffs Corporation. Since then, the Blackley Dyeworks site was integrated into the chemical giant's Specialty Chemicals division

Under ICI stewardship of the Blackley Dyeworks, architect Richard Seifert was commissioned to build Hexagon Tower, with construction completed in 1973. The 14-storey tower was named after the hexagon shaped windows based on the chemical compound benzene, which is widely used in the creation of synthetic dyes.

During its height in the 1960s, more than 14,000 people were employed at the site. However, after growing competition from East Asian dye markets, the Specialty Chemicals division of ICI at Hexagon Tower passed ownership over to Zeneca in the mid-1990s.

Zeneca's move into pharmaceuticals saw Hexagon Tower become Avecia's international headquarters when it was bought by the company in 1999.

=== The Pioneer Group ===
In 2016, The Pioneer Group purchased Hexagon Tower to add to their growing network of over 14 science parks across the UK and ROI.

The Pioneer Group have continued to invest and develop the facility into a multi-let science park, accommodating a range of tenants from SMEs such as Colour Synthesis Solutions, and to multi-national firms, including Intertek. Arxada and Lubrizol.

The site now consists of 167,500 sq ft (15,560 m^{2}) of machine halls, laboratories and office space over 13 floors and a lower ground level with multi-purpose laboratory space.

Hexagon Tower received an International Standards Organisation certification for its environmental responsibility in January 2014. Hexagon Tower is also ISO14001 accredited.

In 2025, Hexagon Tower won 'Best Use of Rainscreen System Using Aluminium' at the annual Façade Awards UK event.

In 2026, Hexagon Tower won a Green Apple award for its commitment and implementation of sustainable cleaning and housekeeping practices.

== Research ==
The site researched Triarylmethane dyes in the 1920s.

It worked with the University of Bradford, which opened its Chemistry and Chemical Technology Building in October 1967.

There was extensive building in the late 1960s, with a £3 million new technical services centre for around 700 scientists. The site claimed to have the largest concentration of organic chemists in the Commonwealth.

The son of a Director of Research was Sir James Baddiley FRS, who was the first to synthesise ATP.

=== Queen's Awards ===
The site won the Queen's Award for Export Achievement, and also for Technological Innovation in 1966. It won the award in 1968 and 1969.

The site won the Queen's Award for Technological Achievement in 1990, under ICI Colours and Fine Chemicals, for work on benzodifuranone-based dyes.

Zeneca LifeScience Molecules won the Queens Award for Technology in 1997 and the award for Export in 1998.

In 1999 Zeneca Metal Extraction won the Queen's Award for Environmental Achievement.

== Timeline of the Blackley Works and Hexagon Tower ==
- 1785 – The first industrial enterprise at Blackley, the Borelle Dyeworks, establishes, and later becomes Delaunay Dyeworks which was known for producing 'Turkey Red' dye.
- 1865 – Nearly a century after it was first established, the dyeworks is taken over by German commercial science entrepreneur Ivan Levinstein.
- 1919 (June) – After 54 years as Levinstein Ltd., the company merges with British Dyes to become the British Dyestuffs Corporation, controlling 75% of dye production in the UK.
- 1926 – British Dyestuffs Corporation merges with several other commercial chemical enterprises to form Imperial Chemical Industries, which would work at the Blackley site for the next 67 years.
- 1969 - It became the headquarters of the Dyestuffs Division, with 10 factories in northern England and Scotland, with two in Manchester, also in Huddersfield and Teesside. The division exported £45M in the late 1960s.
- 1971 – Richard Seifert is commissioned to design Hexagon Tower, with the building completed in 1973.
- 1993 – ICI sells off the Specialty Chemicals division to the Zeneca Group, including Hexagon Tower, as part of its Fine Chemicals division. It became part of Zeneca Specialties, which made dyes for ink jet printers, resins and products for finishing leather products.
- 1999 – AstraZeneca was formed in April 1999. Zeneca Specialties was sold by AstraZeneca in May 1999 for £1.3bn. Hexagon Tower is sold to Avecia, and establishes its headquarters there, as AstraZeneca moves into pharmaceuticals.
- 2008 – Avecia sells Hexagon Tower, with management passing to LaSalle Investment Management, which establishes the facility as a science park, providing a base for small start-up organisations to multinational businesses.
- 2013 – Hexagon Tower is incorporated into the BEST Network.
- 2016 – Hexagon Tower is sold to AG Hexagon BV, part of the Pioneer Group.
- 2024 - Investment by The Pioneer Group of £10,000,000 to triple glaze and clad the main Tower
- 2026 - Investment by The Pioneer Group of £2,000,000 to replace and upgrade key M&E systems

== See also ==
- Fibres Research Centre
- Science and engineering in Manchester
