= Arthur George Green =

British organic chemist

Arthur George Green FRS
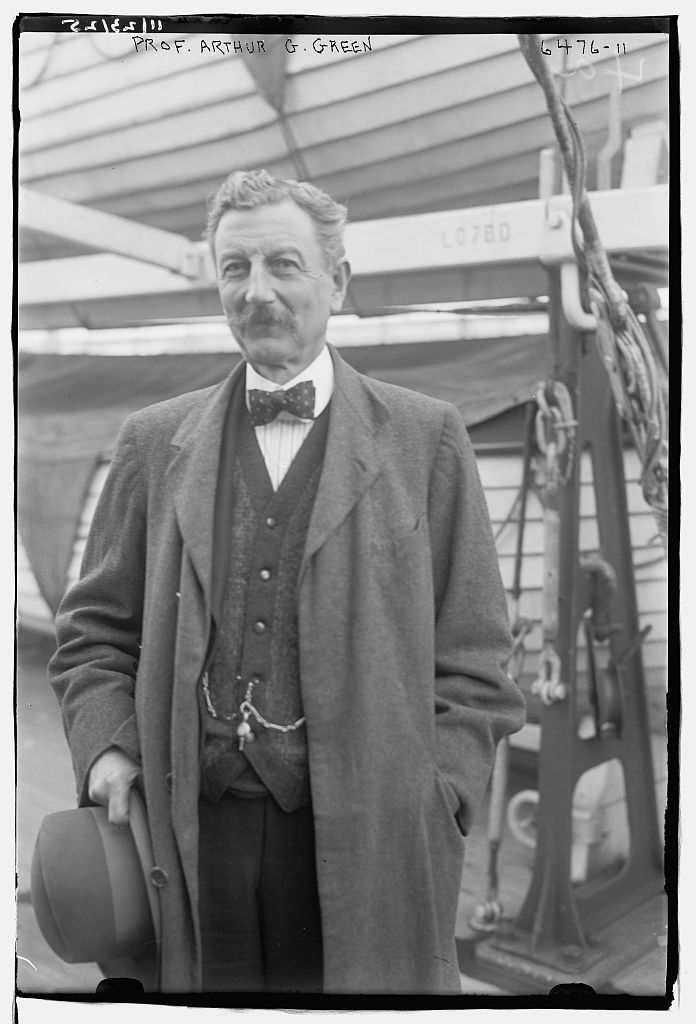
- Professor Arthur G. Green in 1925
- Scientific career
- Fields: organic chemistry

Arthur George Green FRS (1864 – 12 September 1941) was a British organic chemist.

== Career ==
He was educated at Lancing College and University College London. In 1887, Green was working in London for the Brooke, Simpson and Spiller company when he discovered the aniline based dye primuline. In 1894, Green accepted a job with the Clayton Aniline Company as manager of their dyestuff department, a post he held until 1901. From 1902 until 1916, he was Professor of Tinctorial Chemistry at the University of Leeds. In 1916, Green joined the Levinstein Ltd company as Director of Research. He resigned from the company in 1923.

== Awards ==
He was elected to membership of the Manchester Literary and Philosophical Society on 9 April 1895 In 1915, Green was elected a Fellow of the Royal Society and awarded the gold medal of the Worshipful Company of Dyers. In 1917, he was a recipient of the Perkin Medal from the Society of Dyers and Colourists.
