= George Wills =

George Wills may refer to:

- George Alfred Wills (1854–1928), president of Imperial Tobacco
- George G. Wills (1903–1983), Michigan politician
- George S. V. Wills, (1849-1932) English chemist and founder of the Westminster College of Chemistry and Pharmacy
- George Wills, founder of Australian softgoods company G. & R. Wills & Co.
