= Emily Forster =

Emily Forster may refer to:

- Mary Hinton (actress), British actress, born Emily Rachel Forster
- Emily L. B. Forster, English chemist, pharmacist and vegetarian cookbook writer
