= Clayton Aniline Company =

British manufacturer of dyestuffs

The Clayton Aniline Company Ltd.
- Industry: Chemical
- Founded: 1876
- Founder: Charles Dreyfus
- Fate: Acquired
- Headquarters: Clayton, Manchester, England
- Products: Dyestuffs

The Clayton Aniline Company Ltd. was a British manufacturer of dyestuffs, founded in 1876 by Charles Dreyfus in Clayton, Manchester.

== Early history ==
Charles Dreyfus was a French emigrant chemist and entrepreneur, who founded the Clayton Aniline Company on 29 May 1876. The company obtained a lease on a parcel of land in Clayton, Manchester, sandwiched between the Manchester and Ashton Canal and Chatham Street (later known as a Clipstone Street). With an initial share capital of £40,000 (Note: A contemporary newspaper report of the company foundation says the initial share capital was £12,000. Aside from Dreyfus, the founder directors were Alfred William Ashworth, Samuel Charlton and James Farmer.) the company began production of aniline and aniline salt.

In 1894, a brilliant young organic chemist Arthur George Green joined the company. Green had discovered the dye primuline in 1887 and under his guidance the company rapidly expanded its range of dyes. Arthur left the company in 1901.

In 1897, the company was placed into voluntary liquidation and then reformed under the same name with an issued share capital of £140,000. Max Baerlein was appointed as company chairman with Charles Dreyfus as managing director. On 31 January 1900 a young worker, Thomas Musgrave, became caught in machinery and was killed instantly.

Chaim Weizmann joined the company in 1905 as a part-time research consultant, leaving in 1908 to pursue an academic career. Weizmann would later achieve fame through his work on bacterial fermentation and go on to become the first president of Israel.

On 1 May 1911, the Society of Chemical Industry in Basle (later known as CIBA), took control of the company and in 1913 Charles Dreyfus resigned.

== World War I ==
The outbreak of war with Germany in 1914 led to lucrative contracts for the company including the production of 1,500 tons of TNT. The sites facilities were expanded considerably during the war including the construction of a new azo dyes plant (building 183) in 1918. TNT manufacture at the plant ceased following a series of accidents at other explosives factories such as those at Silvertown and Ashton-under-Lyne. Sylvain Dreyfus, a nephew of Charles Dreyfus, perished in the Ashton-under-Lyne disaster when the Hooley Hill Rubber and Chemical Works exploded. These and other accidents prompted the Government to concentrate explosives manufacture at factories sited well away from built up areas. After WW1 a French patent was issued for Trinitrotoluene purification process. by Arnold Schedler.

The construction of a new railway line was begun in 1916, that linked the works via a bridge across Ashton New Road to the existing Stuart Street Power Station branch line.

In September 1918, the Basle Community of Interests was formed from an alliance between Society of Chemical Industry in Basle, the Sandoz Chemical Company Ltd and J.R. Geigy SA. The agreement between the three companies allowed the sharing of research and technical resources whilst each company retained its own autonomy. Later that same year, Sandoz and Geigy each acquired a financial interest in the Clayton Aniline Company.

== 1919 to 1939 ==
During the inter war period the company continued to invest in new plant and products. The Dyestuffs (Import Regulation) Act 1920 had given British dye producers much needed protection from cheap imports and provided an impetus to increasing the range of dyes and intermediates produced at Clayton. In 1930, an additional azo dyes plant (building 187) was completed followed in 1938 by the construction of a new vat dyes complex (buildings 188, 189 and 190). The completion of the vat dyes project was held up by the outbreak of war in 1939.

== World War II ==
In 1940, a new Ministry of Supply factory (building 300) was constructed adjacent to the site for the manufacture of explosives additive Centralite I. The company also gained an important contract to manufacture monomethylaniline used as an antiknock agent in high octane aviation fuel. In 1941, a new aniline plant was built with an output of around 100 tons per week.

On 5 October 1942, a near catastrophe befell the site when an ethylation autoclave caught fire, which threatened the adjacent phosgenation unit. Department manager Eric Shaw risked his life to disconnect and remove to safety gas cylinders filled with phosgene, that were in danger of exploding. Shaw was awarded an MBE in 1943 for his actions. Also commended for their bravery were J.T. Read, J. Wood and R. Dean.

== Postwar ==
The Second World War ended in 1945 and the company began its post war reconstruction. The Centralite plant (building 300) was acquired from the Government and re-equipped as an intermediates plant and plans were drawn up for a new intermediates plant (building 151) which was completed in 1951. Other projects undertaken in the early 1950s included a new PAK-ice plant, a new power plant and a new waste gas tunnel and chimney. The company also began the removal of a chemical spoil heap nicknamed the “mucky mountain”, which was left behind by a soda ash manufacturer that previously occupied the site.

== 1957 to 1965 ==
In 1957, a plan was drawn up to re-build virtually the whole of the site. The project involved the construction of a new triphenylmethane dyes plant (building 75), a new laboratories block (building 80), a milling and blending plant (building 81), an intermediates plant (building 74) and a new azo dyes plant (building 48). An additional azo dyes plant (building 46) was added to the scheme in 1965 to replace (building 187). Extra warehousing was also added to the site including a new intermediates warehouse (building 71) and a new raw materials warehouse (building 50).

1964 marked the end of an era for the company with the decision to cease aniline production at Clayton. The aniline plant was demolished the following year.

== Later history ==
In 1971, CIBA and Geigy merged to form CIBA-GEIGY. The combined group retained a majority shareholding in the Clayton Aniline Company with Sandoz holding the remaining 25% of the equity. CAC was allowed to continue as a separate subsidiary under the chairmanship of Sir Arthur Vere Harvey.

At its peak in the 1970s, the site occupied over 57 acres and employed over 2,000 people. However, due to the gradual demise of the British textile industry, most textile production shifted to countries such as China and India with the textile dye industry following.

CIBA merged their life science businesses with Sandoz in 1997, forming Novartis and Syngenta, and spinning off their respective industrial chemicals' businesses separately to form Ciba Speciality Chemicals and Clariant respectively. This left Clayton as a manufacturing site for direct dyes for cotton, disperse dyes for polyester and metal-complex dyes for wool and nylon; and pigments used for carbonless copying and for thermal printer papers.

Initially the whole site was designated as part of the "Colors" business unit of Ciba Specialty Chemicals; but later the dyes manufacturing, logistics and site management became part of the Textile Effects division, while the carbonless copying paper business was made part of the Consumer Chemicals division and Clayton was designated the global centre for R&D, marketing and sales this type of product.

Manufacturing was gradually transferred to China, India, Thailand and Mexico in response to sustained price competition from emerging competitors in China and India and the workforce was reduced accordingly. In 2004 the announcement was made that the site would be closing with the loss of over 300 remaining jobs. A small number of staff were retained to assist in the decommissioning of the plant. The last workers left the site in 2007 and the remainder of the buildings were demolished shortly afterwards.

Although initially expected to be re-used for housing, the site remained undeveloped for a number of years afterwards. Then in 2012, City Football Group (CFG) announced that they would be building a world-class training and academy complex for all Manchester City men's, women's and youth football teams; a new 7,000 capacity academy stadium; an institute of sport; a sixth form college and their new global operational HQ on the site and its surrounding area, which would accompany the City of Manchester Stadium which opened opposite the site in 2002. These new facilities opened in December 2014 after two years of land remediation and construction work.

== See also ==
- British Dyestuffs Corporation
- Allied Corporation
- IG Farben
- United Alkali Company
