= 1892 Salford Borough Council election =

Local election in Salford

- 1 November 1892

16 of 64 seats on Salford County Borough Council 33 seats needed for a majority
	First party	Second party	Third party
Party	Conservative	Liberal	Independent
Seats before	33	31	0
Seats won	6	9	1
Seats after	32	31	1
Seat change	▼1	Steady	▲1
Popular vote	5,508	8,916	2,083
Percentage	33.0%	53.4%	12.5%
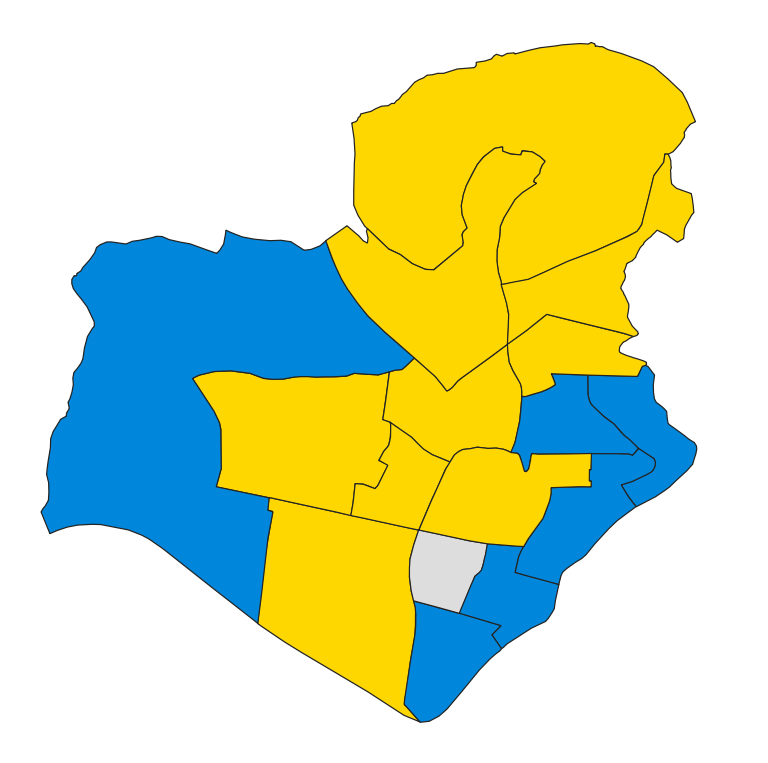
- Map of results of 1892 election
Leader of the Council before election
Conservative
Leader of the Council after election
No overall control

Elections to Salford Borough Council were held on Tuesday, 1 November 1892. One third of the councillors seats were up for election, with each successful candidate to serve a three-year term of office. Extensive ward boundary changes came into effect at this election, however, the number of councillors was retained and displaced members were allocated to newly created wards for the remainder of their terms.

The Conservative Party lost overall control of the council.

== Election result ==
Party	Votes	Seats			Full Council	
Conservative Party	5,508 (33.0%)	6 (37.5%)	6 / 16	▼1	32 (50.0%)	32 / 64
Liberal Party	8,916 (53.4%)	9 (56.3%)	9 / 16	Steady	31 (48.4%)	31 / 64
Independent	2,083 (12.5%)	1 (6.3%)	1 / 16	▲1	1 (1.6%)	1 / 64
Social Democratic Federation	189 (1.1%)	0 (0.0%)	0 / 16	Steady	0 (0.0%)	0 / 64

=== Full council ===
↓
31	1	32

=== Aldermen ===
↓
5	11

=== Councillors ===
↓
26	1	21

== Ward results ==
=== Albert Park ===
Albert Park
Party	Candidate	Votes	%	±%
Liberal	E. D. Mansfield	uncontested		
Liberal hold		Swing		

=== Charlestown ===
Charlestown
Party	Candidate	Votes	%	±%
Liberal	G. H. Openshaw	843	63.0	
Conservative	E. Pollitt	495	37.0	
Majority		348	26.0	
Turnout		1,338		
Liberal gain from Conservative		Swing		

=== Crescent ===
Crescent
Party	Candidate	Votes	%	±%
Liberal	W. Yearnshaw*	793	51.1	
Independent	J. F. le Page	759	48.9	
Majority		34	2.2	
Turnout		1,552		
Liberal hold		Swing		

=== Grosvenor ===
Grosvenor
Party	Candidate	Votes	%	±%
Liberal	T. Smith	909	60.6	
Conservative	E. Pollitt	591	39.4	
Majority		318	21.2	
Turnout		1,500		
Liberal gain from Conservative		Swing		

=== Hope ===
Hope
Party	Candidate	Votes	%	±%
Conservative	A. Haworth	570	51.5	
Liberal	P. Hampson	536	48.5	
Majority		34	3.0	
Turnout		1,106		
Conservative hold		Swing		

=== Islington ===
Islington
Party	Candidate	Votes	%	±%
Conservative	W. G. Groves*	uncontested		
Conservative hold		Swing		

=== Kersal ===
Kersal
Party	Candidate	Votes	%	±%
Liberal	J. G. de Thibatlier Mandley*	490	50.8	
Conservative	E. Pleasance	474	49.2	
Majority		16	1.6	
Turnout		964		
Liberal hold		Swing		

=== Ordsall ===
Ordsall
Party	Candidate	Votes	%	±%
Conservative	C. S. Madan	823	59.9	
Liberal	R. Murphy	550	40.1	
Majority		273	19.8	
Turnout		1,373		
Conservative hold		Swing		

=== Regent ===
Regent
Party	Candidate	Votes	%	±%
Independent	J. Higson	676	50.1	
Liberal	E. Desquenses*	674	49.9	
Majority		2	0.2	
Turnout		1,350		
Independent gain from Liberal		Swing		

=== St. Matthias' ===
St. Matthias'
Party	Candidate	Votes	%	±%
Conservative	H. Linsley*	uncontested		
Conservative hold		Swing		

=== St. Paul's ===
St. Paul's
Party	Candidate	Votes	%	±%
Liberal	J. Lindsay*	637	56.3	
Conservative	S. Bowden	495	43.7	
Majority		142	12.6	
Turnout		1,132		
Liberal hold		Swing		

=== St. Thomas' ===
St. Thomas'
Party	Candidate	Votes	%	±%
Liberal	T. L. Luckman	648	53.2	
Conservative	T. Kay	570	46.8	
Majority		78	6.4	
Turnout		1,218		
Liberal hold		Swing		

=== Seedley ===
Seedley
Party	Candidate	Votes	%	±%
Liberal	H. Roper*	984	86.9	
Conservative	M. Baxter	148	13.1	
Majority		836	73.8	
Turnout		1,132		
Liberal hold		Swing		

=== Trafford ===
Trafford
Party	Candidate	Votes	%	±%
Conservative	J. Thompson	537	47.1	
Liberal	J. Bratherton	415	36.4	
Social Democratic Federation	T. M. Purves	189	16.5	
Majority		122	10.7	
Turnout		1,141		
Conservative gain from Liberal		Swing		

=== Trinity ===
Trinity
Party	Candidate	Votes	%	±%
Conservative	R. Balderstone*	805	50.5	
Liberal	H. B. Harrison*	788	49.5	
Majority		17	1.0	
Turnout		1,593		
Conservative hold		Swing		

=== Weaste ===
Weaste
Party	Candidate	Votes	%	±%
Liberal	D. Sharrocks*	649	50.1	
Independent	A. A. Mitchell	648	49.9	
Majority		1	0.2	
Turnout		1,297		
Liberal hold		Swing		

== Aldermanic elections ==
=== Aldermanic elections, 9 November 1892 ===
At the meeting of the council on 9 November 1892, the terms of office of eight aldermen expired.

The following eight were elected as aldermen by the council on 9 November 1892 for a term of six years.

Party	Alderman	Ward	Term expires
Liberal	William Henry Bailey*		1898
Conservative	Richard Husband*		1898
Conservative	Thomas Henry Jenkins*		1898
Conservative	Peter Keevney*		1898
Liberal	Benjamin Robinson*		1898
Conservative	William Robinson*		1898
Liberal	Joshua Shaw		1898
Conservative	Francis Henry Walmsley*		1898

== By-elections between 1892 and 1893 ==
=== St. Matthias', 24 November 1892 ===
Caused by the election as an alderman of Councillor Joshua Shaw (Liberal, St. Matthias', elected 24 November 1880) on 9 November 1892, following the death on 28 October 1892 of Alderman Sir James Farmer (Conservative, elected as an alderman by the council on 9 November 1880).

St. Matthias'
Party	Candidate	Votes	%	±%
Liberal	H. B. Harrison	1,033	55.6	N/A
Conservative	J. Shaw	824	44.4	N/A
Majority		209	11.2	N/A
Turnout		1,857		
Liberal hold		Swing		

=== By-elections, 21 June 1893 ===
Two by-elections were held on 21 June 1893 to fill vacancies which had arisen in the borough council.

==== Hope ====
Caused by the death of Councillor Albert Fletcher (Conservative, Hope, elected 1 November 1888) on 5 June 1893.

Hope
Party	Candidate	Votes	%	±%
Conservative	R. Hudson	643	56.1	+4.6
Liberal	J. E. Robinson	504	43.9	−4.6
Majority		139	12.2	+9.2
Turnout		1,147		
Conservative hold		Swing		

==== St. Paul's ====
Caused by the disqualification of Councillor John Lindsay (Liberal, St. Paul's, elected 1 November 1883) on 7 June 1893.

St. Paul's
Party	Candidate	Votes	%	±%
Conservative	S. Bowden	539	48.7	+5.0
Liberal	H. Cheetham	423	38.2	−18.1
Social Democratic Federation	W. Horrocks	145	13.1	N/A
Majority		116	10.5	
Turnout		1,107		
Conservative gain from Liberal		Swing		
