= Emily L. B. Forster =

English chemist and vegetarian cookbook writer

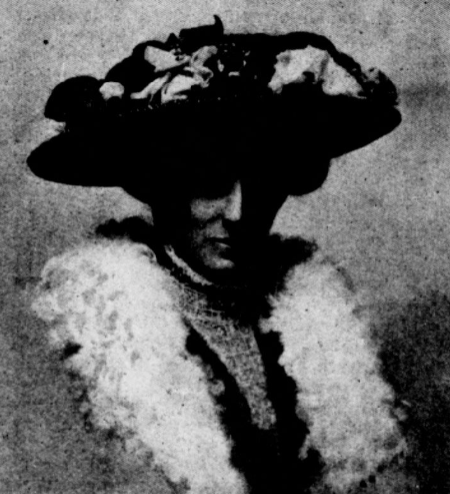
- Born: Emily Lydia Brady Forster; 1870; Chester
- Died: 4 September 1939 (aged 68–69); Chelsea, London
- Occupation: Chemist

Emily Lydia Brady Forster (1870 – 4 September 1939) was an English chemist, pharmacist and vegetarian cookbook writer.

== Life ==
Forster was born in 1870 in Chester to Robert Cochrane Forester and Lydia Brougham Vaughan. She trained in pharmacy and in 1917 authored How to Become a Dispenser: A New Profession for Women. She was a lecturer at the Westminster College of Pharmacy in 1920 and was a private assistant to. Prof. Huntington of King's College London. She was an analyst at the Metallurgical Laboratory and a member of the Society of Chemical Industry.

Forster campaigned for more females to enter the chemistry profession. In 1920, she commented that "since the war there are so many openings for women in chemical laboratories, where much useful and interesting work can be done". She died in 1939, aged 69.

== Vegetarianism ==
Forster was a vegetarian. She authored Vegetarian Cookery in 1930 which was republished in 1942 as Everybody's Vegetarian Cookery Book. It contains a chapter on wartime food.

== Selected publications ==
- How to Become a Dispenser: A New Profession for Women (1917)
- How to Become a Woman Doctor (1918)
- Analytical Chemistry as a Profession for Women (1920)
- Vegetarian Cookery (1930)
