= Edward Ryley Langworthy =

British politician (1797–1874)

Member of Parliament for Salford
- In office February 1857 – April 1857
- Preceded by: Joseph Brotherton
- Succeeded by: William Nathaniel Massey

Ceremonial Mayor of Salford
- In office 1848–1850

Alderman of Trinity
- In office 1848–
- Preceded by: None

Personal details
- Born: 1797 London, England
- Died: 7 April 1874 (aged 76–77)
- Party: Independent, Whig
- Occupation: Businessman, Politician

Edward Ryley (or Riley) Langworthy (1797 – 7 April 1874) was a British businessman and an independent but Whig-leaning politician.

== Early life ==
Langworthy was born in 1797 London, the son of a Somerset merchant. He worked in Central and South America for 12 years as a textile merchant for C. Taylor & Sons.

== Cotton industry ==
In 1837 he moved to Salford, Lancashire to join his brother George's cotton business alongside their other brother, Lewis. George Langworthy & Co. was first established around 1822, then became Langworthy Brothers & Co. based at Greengate Mill on the bank of the River Irwell.

== Political career ==
When Salford was incorporated as a municipal borough in 1844, Langworthy was elected as the first alderman for Trinity ward. He was the borough's fifth mayor, elected for two consecutive terms from 1848 to 1850. His term as mayor saw the establishment of the free public museum and library at Peel Park.

In January 1857, Salford's Whig Member of Parliament, Joseph Brotherton, died. Langworthy was selected as the party's candidate for the vacancy, and as the only nominee, was elected unopposed on 2 February. Following his election he gave a speech outlining his political views: he supported the temperance movement, free trade and civil and religious freedom, the reform of parliament, strengthened local government, but opposed any increase in the size of the country's armed forces. He was only Salford's MP for a matter of months, as he did not stand at the subsequent 1857 general election.

== Death and legacy ==
Langworthy retained his connection with Salford Corporation, and on his death in 1874 left £10,000 to the museum and library he had helped establish. Langworthy Road, constructed shortly after his death, was named in his memory by Salford Borough Council. Edward also left £100,000 (equivalent to £12,400,000 in 2024) to George’s son.

Parliament of the United Kingdom
Preceded by Joseph Brotherton	Member of Parliament for Salford; 1857	Succeeded by William Nathaniel Massey
