= British Dyestuffs Corporation =

Former British chemical company

British Dyestuffs Corporation Ltd
- Industry: Chemicals
- Founded: 1919; 107 years ago
- Defunct: 1926; 100 years ago
- Fate: merged into Imperial Chemical Industries
- Headquarters: Huddersfield, West Yorkshire, England, United Kingdom
- Products: dyes

British Dyestuffs Corporation Ltd (BDC) was a British company formed in 1919 from the merger of British Dyes Ltd with Levinstein Ltd. The British Government was the company's largest shareholder, and had two directors on the board.

== Background ==
By 1913, the Germans had provided 80% of the dyes used in Britain. Even the 20% that was produced in the US was mainly reliant on German intermediates. Stocks of dyes and intermediates were exhausted when World War I broke out in 1914, putting the textile industry in jeopardy. This situation was criticised in particular by Ivan Levinstein.

In July 1915, British Dyes, Ltd., was created and bought Read Holliday & Sons of Huddersfield, West Yorkshire. In 1919, Levinsteins merged with British Dyes, which became the country's largest dye maker and was renamed the British Dyestuffs Corporation Ltd. Sir Joseph Turner and Dr. Herbert Levinstein became the joint managing directors of BDC. The new company controlled 75% of the entire dye production in Britain, its capitalization was £10 million.

BDC supplied a comprehensive range of dyes within a competitive market. Its most notable foreign competitors were Allied Dye & Chemical, Du Pont, and IG Farben. In 1920, BDC produced 16,000 tons, however the dyes range was smaller than before the World War I (500 compared with 2,000).

It became one of the four British chemical companies which merged in 1926 with Brunner Mond, Nobel Explosives, and United Alkali Company to form Imperial Chemical Industries. That year, BDC developed and patented a process for the prevention of mildew in textile fabrics by the use of halogenated phenols. The decision to become part of it was made in the face of the threat posed after the establishment of IG Farben, which threatened to dominate the European market.

The company had manufacturing sites at Dalton, Huddersfield, Blackley, Manchester, and Ardeer, North Ayrshire.

== See also ==
- Allied Corporation
- IG Farben
- United Alkali Company
- Clayton Aniline Company
