= Biofuels, Bioproducts and Biorefining =

- Language: English
- Edited by: Bruce E. Dale

Publication details
- History: 2007–present
- Publisher: Wiley on behalf of the Society of Chemical Industry
- Frequency: Bimonthly
- Impact factor: 4.102 (2020)

Standard abbreviations
- ISO 4: Biofuels Bioprod. Biorefin.

Indexing
- CODEN: BBBICH
- ISSN: 1932-104X (print); 1932-1031 (web)

Links
- Journal homepage; Online archive

Biofuels, Bioproducts and Biorefining (ISSN 1932-1031) is a bimonthly peer-reviewed review and commentary journal published by John Wiley & Sons on behalf of the Society of Chemical Industry. The journal was established in 2007 and the editor in chief is Bruce E. Dale. According to the Journal Citation Reports, the journal's 2020 impact factor is 4.102.
