= List of ceremonial mayors of Salford =

Ceremonial Mayor of Salford
- Incumbent; Robin Garrido since 2025
- Appointer: Salford City Council
- Website: Ceremonial Mayor of Salford

The Ceremonial mayor of Salford is the ceremonial leader of the City of Salford in Greater Manchester, England. The ceremonial mayor is appointed annually from the members of Salford City Council and serves for one municipal year.

== History ==
The last borough reeve and first Mayor of Salford, 1844–1845, was William Lockett.

== Mayors of Salford ==
Source: https://www.salford.gov.uk/your-council/ceremonial-mayor-of-salford/civic-history/previous-mayors/

- 1844–1845 William Lockett (first Mayor of Salford)
- 1845–1846 John Kay
- 1846–1847 Robert Livingstone
- 1847–1848 William Jenkinson
- 1848–1850 Edward Ryley Langworthy (two consecutive years), MP for Salford, 1857
- 1850–1851 Thomas Agnew
- 1851–1853 Frank Ashton (two consecutive years)
- 1853–1855 William Ross (two consecutive years)
- 1855–1857 Stephen Heelis (two consecutive years)
- 1857–1859 William Harvey (two consecutive years)
- 1859–1861 James Weston (two consecutive years)
- 1861–1862 James Worrall
- 1862–1864 William Pearson (two consecutive years)
- 1864–1866 Wright Turner (two consecutive years)
- 1866–1868 Henry Davis Pochin (two consecutive years)
- 1868–1871 Thomas Davies (three consecutive years)
- 1871–1873 Thomas Barlow (two consecutive years)
- 1873–1876 Richard Harwood (three consecutive years)
- 1876–1878 Francis Walmsley (two consecutive years)
- 1878–1881 William Robinson (three consecutive years)
- 1881–1883 Richard Husband (two consecutive years)
- 1883–1885 Charles Makinson (two consecutive years)
- 1885–1887 James Farmer (two consecutive years)
- 1887–1889 Albert Dickins (two consecutive years)
- 1889–1891 Benjamin Robinson (two consecutive years)
- 1891–1893 Peter Keevney (two consecutive years)
- 1893–1894 Sir William Bailey
- 1894–1897 Sir Richard Mottram (three consecutive years)
- 1897–1898 Richard Husband
- 1898–1898 Sir Richard Mottram
- 1898–1902 Samuel Rudman (four consecutive years)
- 1902–1905 Alderman Sir William Stephens (Liberal) (three consecutive years)
- 1905–1908 Isidor Frankenburg (three consecutive years)
- 1908–1909 Thomas Jenkins
- 1909–1910 Joseph Snape
- 1910–1911 Frank Phillips
- 1911–1912 Henry Linsley
- 1912–1913 William Ollier
- 1913–1914 Ernest Desquesnes
- 1914–1915 Alfred Worsley
- 1915–1916 Julius Hulton
- 1916–1917 James Higson
- 1917–1918 William Huddart
- 1918–1919 Edwin Mather
- 1919–1920 William Hughes
- 1920–1921 Frederick Hampson
- 1921–1922 George Barker
- 1922–1923 Walter Barrett
- 1923–1924 John McDougall
- 1924–1925 George Billington
- 1925–1926 Samuel Delves
- 1926–1927 John Rothwell
- 1927–1928 Abraham Williamson
- 1928–1929 Albert Collins
- 1929–1930 Samuel Finburgh
- 1930–1931 John Bloom
- 1931–1932 Joseph Jackson
- 1932–1933 Sir James Emery
- 1933–1934 Edward Hardy, MP for Salford South, 1945 and Salford East, 1950
- 1934–2000 See source
- 1943-1944 Cornelius J Townsend
- 2000–2001 Barry Warner
- 2001–2002 Jim King
- 2002–2003 Ben Wallsworth
- 2003–2004 Jimmy Hulmes
- 2004–2005 Stan Witkowski
- 2005–2006 Jimmy Hunt
- 2006–2007 Bernard Murphy
- 2007–2008 Valerie Burgoyne
- 2008–2009 Margaret Morris
- 2009–2010 Roger Lightup
- 2010–2011 George Wilson
- 2011–2012 Eric Burgoyne

=== Ceremonial mayors ===
- 2012–2013 Bernard Lea
- 2013–2014 Alan Clague
- 2014–2015 Christine Hudson
- 2015–2016 Peter Dobbs
- 2016–2017 Karen Garrido
- 2017–2018 Peter Connor
- 2018–2019 Ronnie Wilson
- 2019–2020 Charlie McIntyre
- 2020–2022 John Mullen
- 2022–2023 Ann- Marie Humphreys
- 2023–2024 Gina Reynolds
- 2024–2025 Tanya Burch
- 2025–2026 Heather Fletcher
- 2026–2027 Robin Garrido
