= Journal of Chemical Technology & Biotechnology =

- Discipline: Biotechnology, chemical technology
- Language: English
- Edited by: Dionissios Mantzavinos

Publication details
- Former names: Journal of the Society of Chemical Industry Journal of Applied Chemistry Journal of Applied Chemistry and Biotechnology
- History: 1882–present
- Publisher: Society of Chemical Industry
- Frequency: Monthly
- Impact factor: 3.174 (2020)

Standard abbreviations
- ISO 4: J. Chem. Technol. Biotechnol.

Indexing
- CODEN: JCTBED
- ISSN: 0268-2575 (print); 1097-4660 (web)
- LCCN: 86641339
- OCLC no.: 488589990

Links
- Journal homepage; Online access; Online archive

The Journal of Chemical Technology & Biotechnology is a monthly peer-reviewed scientific journal. It was established in 1882 as the Journal of the Society of Chemical Industry by the Society of Chemical Industry (SCI). In 1950 it changed its title to Journal of Applied Chemistry and volume numbering restarted at 1. In 1971 the journal changed its title to Journal of Applied Chemistry and Biotechnology and in 1983 it obtained the current title. It covers chemical and biological technology relevant for economically and environmentally sustainable industrial processes. The journal is published by John Wiley & Sons on behalf of SCI.

== Abstracting and indexing ==
The journal is abstracted and indexed in:

- AGRICOLA
- ProQuest databases
- EBSCO databases
- Elsevier BIOBASE
- Biological Abstracts
- BIOSIS Previews
- CAB Abstracts
- Chemical Abstracts Service
- Current Contents/Agriculture, Biology & Environmental Sciences
- Current Contents/Engineering, Computing & Technology
- Ei Compendex
- Embase
- GEOBASE
- Global Health
- PASCAL
- Science Citation Index
- Scopus
- VINITI Database RAS

According to the Journal Citation Reports, the journal has a 2020 impact factor of 3.174.
