= Science and technology in Manchester =

History of science and technology in UK city

Manchester is one of the principal cities of the United Kingdom, gaining city status in 1853, thus becoming the first new city in over 300 years since Bristol in 1542. Often regarded as the first industrialised city, Manchester was a city built by the Industrial Revolution and had little pre-medieval history to speak of. Manchester had a population of 10,000 in 1717, but by 1911 it had grown to 2.3 million.

As its population and influence burgeoned, Manchester became a centre for new discoveries, scientific breakthroughs, and technological developments in engineering. A famous but unattributed quote linked to Manchester is: "What Manchester does today, the rest of the world does tomorrow". Pioneering breakthroughs such as the first 'true' canal which spawned 'Canal Mania', the first intercity railway station which led to 'railway mania' and the first stored-program computer. The city has achieved great success in the field of physics, with the electron (J. J. Thomson, 1897), proton (Rutherford, 1917), neutron (James Chadwick, 1934) all being discovered by scientists educated (Chadwick and Rutherford) or born (Thomson) in Manchester.

Famous scientists to have studied in Manchester include John Dalton, James Prescott Joule, J. J. Thomson, Ernest Rutherford, James Chadwick and Alan Turing. A creative and often seen as a bohemian city, Manchester also had the highest number of patent applications per head of population in the United Kingdom in 2003. The city is served by the University of Manchester, previously UMIST and the Victoria University of Manchester pre-2004. The university has a total of 25 Nobel Laureates; only the Oxbridge universities have more Nobel laureates. The city is also served by the Museum of Science and Industry, celebrating Mancunian, as well as national achievements in both fields.

== 17th century ==
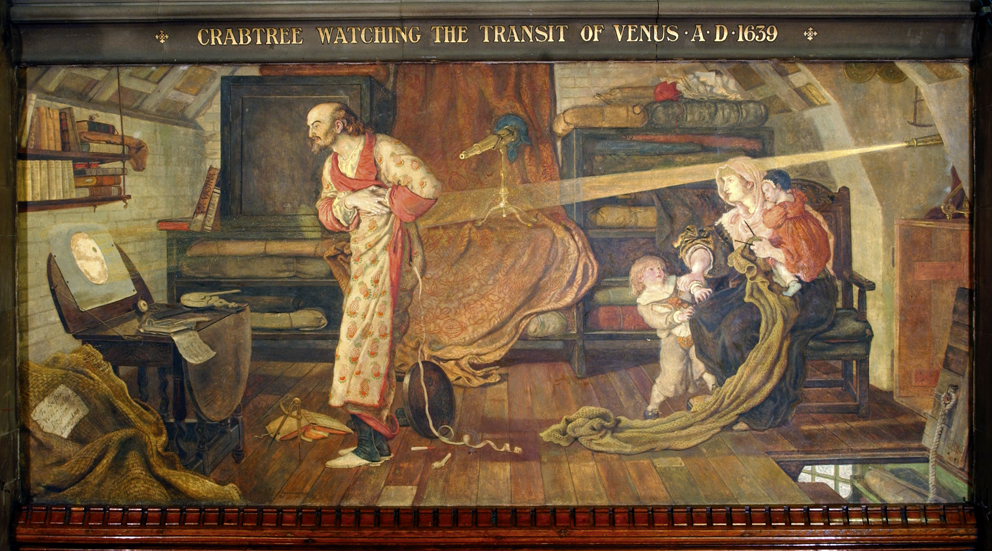
A romanticised version of William Crabtree observing the transit of Venus by Madox Brown.

In 1630, astronomer William Crabtree observed the transit of Venus. Crabtree was born in the hamlet of "Broughton Spout" which was on the east bank of the River Irwell, near the area now known as "The Priory" in Broughton and was educated at The Manchester Grammar School. He married into a wealthy family and worked as a merchant in Manchester. However, in his spare time, his great interest was astronomy. He carefully measured the movements of the planets and undertook precise astronomical calculations. With improved accuracy, he rewrote the existing Rudolphine Tables of Planetary Positions.

Crabtree corresponded with Jeremiah Horrocks (who sometimes spelt his name in the Latinised form as Horrox), another enthusiastic amateur astronomer, from 1636. A group of astronomers from the north of England, which included William Gascoigne, formed around them and were Britain's first followers of the astronomy of Johannes Kepler. "Nos Keplari" as the group called themselves, were distinguished as being the first people to gain a realistic notion of the solar system's size. Crabtree and Horrocks were the only astronomers to observe, plot, and record the transit of the planet Venus across the Sun, as predicted by Horrocks, on 24 November 1639 (Julian calendar, or 4 December in the Gregorian calendar). They also predicted the next occurrence on 8 June 2004. The two correspondents both recorded the event in their own homes, and it is not known whether they ever met in person, but Crabtree's calculations were crucial in allowing Horrocks to estimate the size of Venus and the distance from the Earth to the Sun. Unfortunately, Horrocks died early in 1641 the day before he was due to meet Crabtree. Crabtree made his will on 19 July 1644 and was buried within the precincts of the Manchester Collegiate Church on 1 August 1644, close to where he had received his education.

== 18th century ==
=== The creation of the first economically successful canal ===
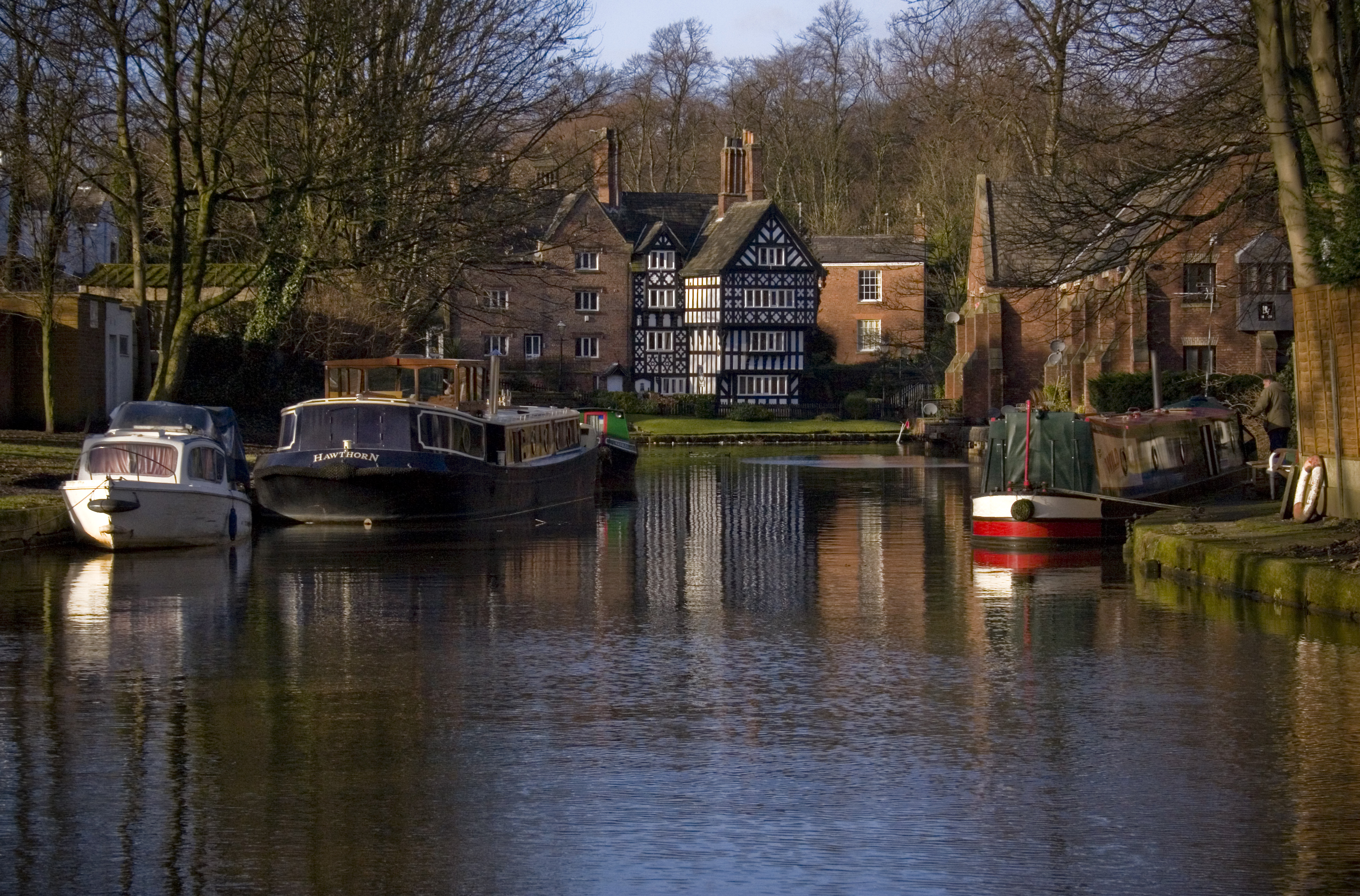
The pioneering Bridgewater Canal, an economically successful canal which spawned 'Canal Mania'.

The Bridgewater Canal, opening in 1761, is generally regarded as the earliest successful canal. The Bridgewater Canal connects Runcorn, Manchester, and Leigh, in North West England. It was commissioned by Francis Egerton, 3rd Duke of Bridgewater to transport coal from his mines in Worsley to Manchester. It was opened in 1761 from Worsley to Manchester, and later extended from Manchester to Runcorn, and then from Worsley to Leigh.

The Duke invested a large sum of money in the scheme. From Worsley to Manchester its construction cost £168,000 (equivalent to £30,990,710 in 2025), but its advantages over land and river transport meant that within a year of its opening in 1761, the price of coal in Manchester fell by about half. This success helped inspire a period of intense canal building, known as Canal Mania. Along with its stone aqueduct at Barton-upon-Irwell, the Bridgewater Canal was considered a major engineering achievement. One commentator wrote that when finished, "[the canal] will be the most extraordinary thing in the Kingdom, if not in Europe. The boats in some places are to go underground, and in other places over a navigable river, without communicating with its waters ...".

== 19th century ==
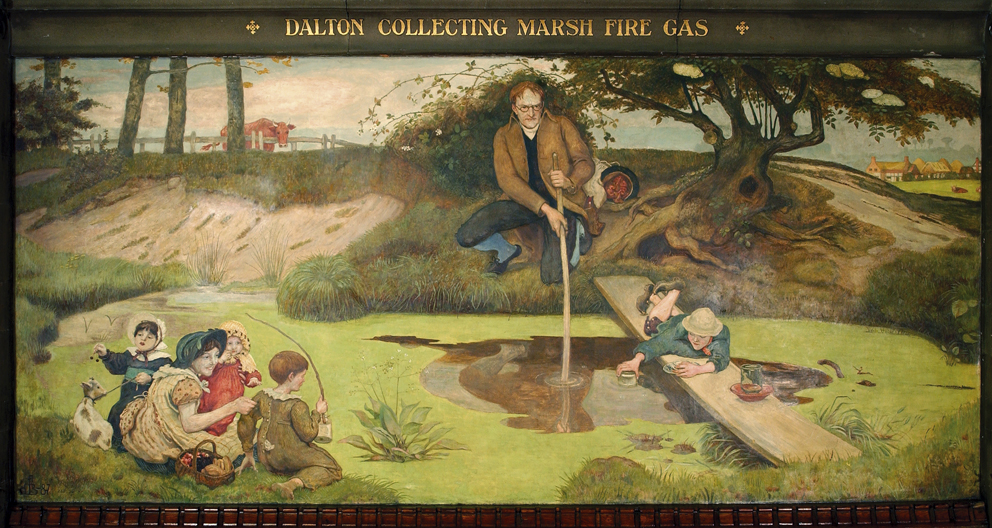
A painting by Madox Brown depicting John Dalton collecting marsh gas to help ascertain Dalton's atomic theory

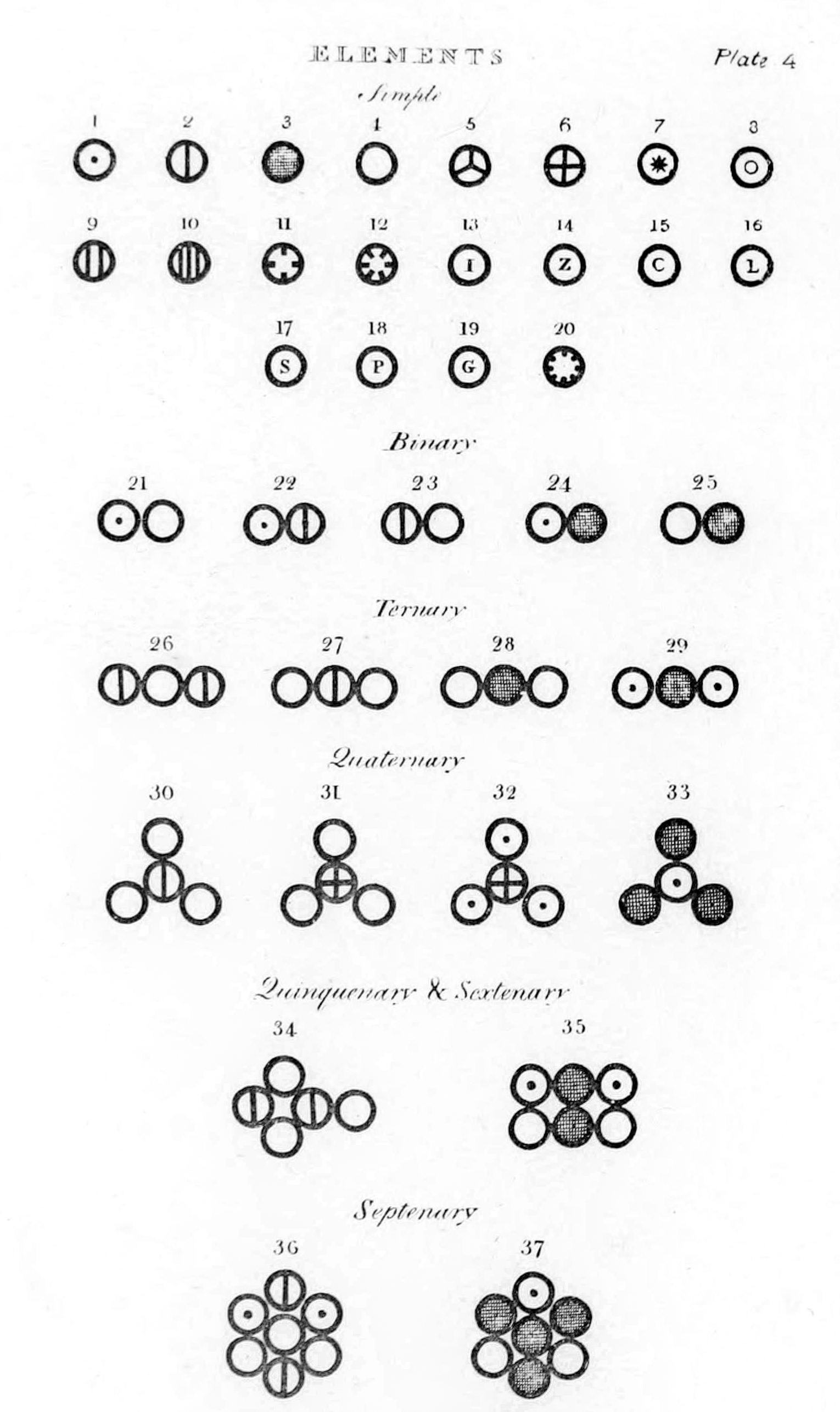
Various atoms and molecules as depicted in John Dalton's A New System of Chemical Philosophy (1808).

John Dalton, was born in Cumberland in 1766. A promising young scientist, he moved to Manchester in 1793. He hypothesised the idea of "colour blindness", a theory which was alien to all as it had not been formally talked about before. Dalton hypothesised the idea from his own experience, as he suffered from discoloured eyesight himself. Dalton would go on to propose the Dalton atomic theory in which he hypothesised that elements were made of small particles called atoms.

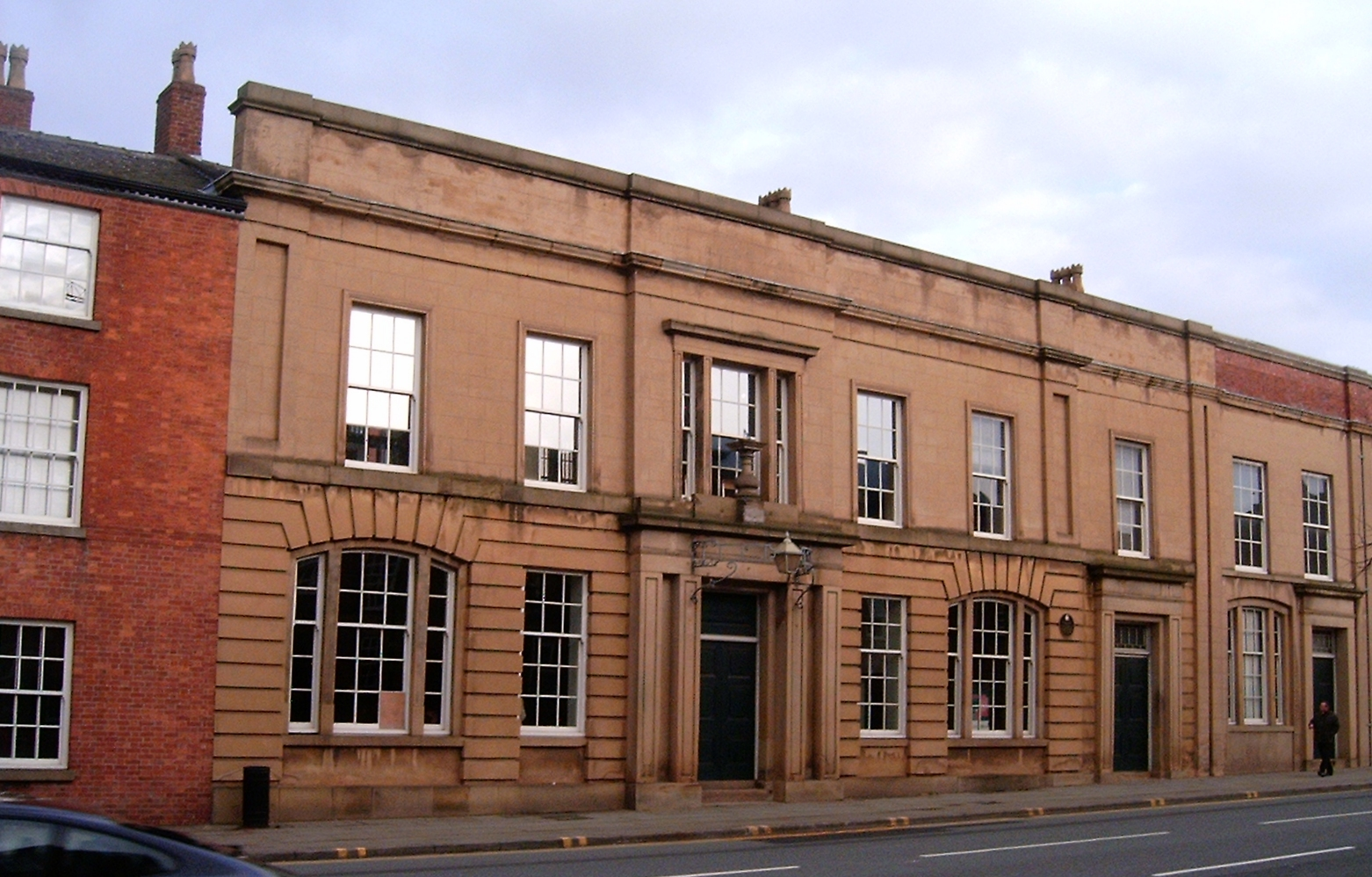
The Manchester Liverpool Road railway station, the world's first intercity railway station

Manchester Liverpool Road is a former railway station on the Liverpool and Manchester Railway in Manchester, which opened on 15 September 1830. The L&MR station was the terminus of the world's first inter-city passenger railway in which all services were hauled by timetabled steam locomotives. It is now the world's oldest surviving terminal railway station. The station closed to passenger services on 4 May 1844 when the line was extended to join the Manchester and Leeds Railway at Hunt's Bank. Liverpool Road was superseded by Manchester Victoria railway station. Since Liverpool Road ceased operation, the oldest railway station still in use is Earlestown railway station which also opened on 15 September 1830. However the station is still preserved by the Museum of Science and Industry.

Robert Angus Smith, a Scottish chemist, visited Manchester in the 1840s. In his research in Manchester, Smith discovered the existence of acid rain, a byproduct of the industrial revolution. Smith consequently pushed for greater environmental awareness and helped to found the Noxious Vapours Abatement Society in Manchester, which raised awareness of the consequences of poor air.

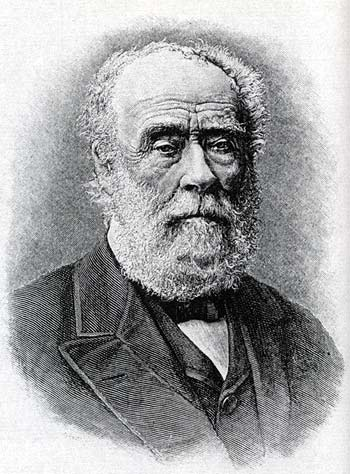
A drawing portrait of Sir Joseph Whitworth.

=== Joseph Whitworth ===
Joseph Whitworth was an engineer and inventor who hailed from Stockport, Cheshire (now Greater Manchester). A talented mechanic amongst various other engineering roles, for long periods of his life, he worked in factories in Manchester. Whitworth would ultimately devise a standard screw thread system, the first of its kind in the world. The system he created in 1841 would become known as the British Standard Whitworth.

Whitworth also invented the Whitworth rifle, which was a giant leap in the development of the rifle, delivering a shooting range that far exceeded any firearm available at the time. In the American Civil War, Confederate troops equipped with barrel-length three power scopes mounted on the exceptionally accurate Whitworth rifle had been known to kill Union officers at ranges of about 800 yards (731.5m), an unheard-of distance at that time. Consequently, the Whitworth rifle is considered one of the earliest examples of a sniper rifle, if not the first. In recognition of his achievements, a number of buildings in Manchester are named after him as is Whitworth Street. As part of his bequest, the Whitworth Art Gallery was created in his honour.

=== John Frederick Bateman and water supply ===
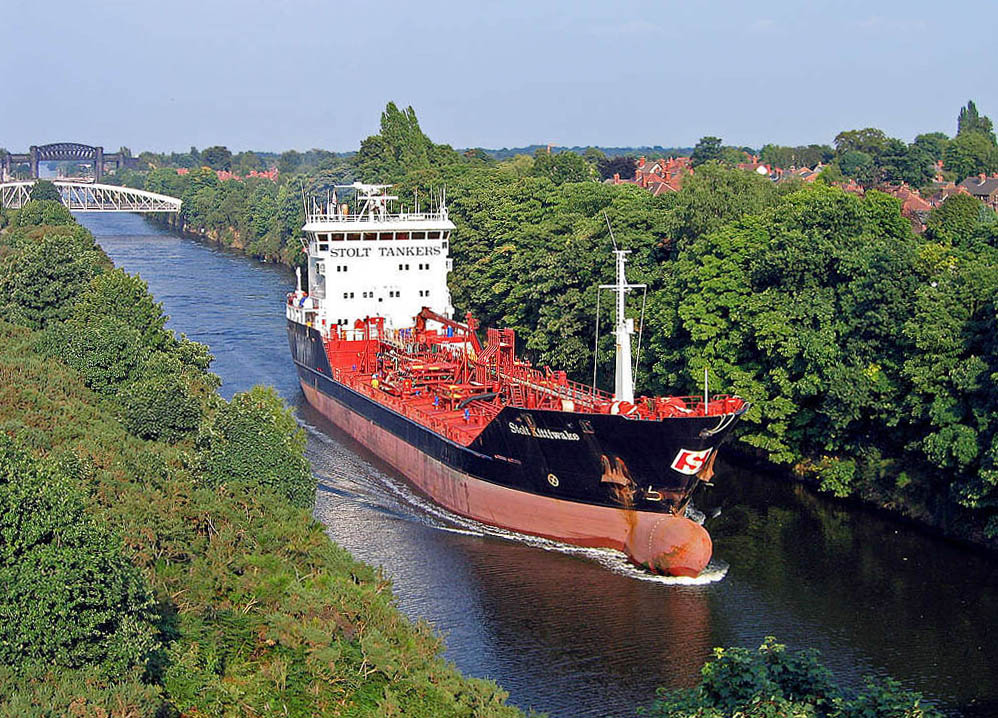
The Manchester Ship Canal, the world's longest ship canal upon opening in 1894

By the 1850s, Manchester had grown into an industrial city, but the alacrity of such development had placed great strain on the city's infrastructure. Engineering developments such as water supplies, sewers, and transport links (typically via canals) would provide Manchester with the necessary supplies to move forward.

In the 1840s, the Manchester Corporation Waterworks recommended to the city corporation that an infrastructure to increase water supplies to cope with demand must be built. The obvious choice for this supply would come from areas of high rainfall, and there were three choices that were close enough to Manchester. The Lake District, Peak District, and Snowdonia are traditionally rainy areas with their numerous valleys, ideal for a large reservoir. This was rejected in favour of John Frederick Bateman's proposal to build a supply chain of six reservoirs in the Longdendale Valley to the east of Manchester.

Further feats of engineering were required to cope with Manchester's increasing demand for water. From 1890 to 1925, the Thirlmere Aqueduct was constructed from Thirlmere to Heaton Park Reservoir.

=== Manchester Ship Canal ===
In the 1880s, plans for a new Manchester Ship Canal were proposed. The idea was championed by Manchester manufacturer Daniel Adamson, who arranged a meeting at his home, The Towers in Didsbury, on 27 June 1882. He invited the representatives of several Lancashire towns, local businessmen and politicians, and two civil engineers: Hamilton Fulton and Edward Leader Williams. Fulton's design was for a tidal canal, with no locks and a deepened channel into Manchester. With the city about 60 feet (18 m) above sea level, the docks and quays would have been well below the surrounding surface. Williams' plan was to dredge a channel between a set of retaining walls, and build a series of locks and sluices to lift incoming vessels up to Manchester. Both engineers were invited to submit their proposals, and Williams' plans were selected to form the basis of a bill to be submitted to Parliament later that year. The Manchester Ship Canal briefly became the longest ship canal in the world upon opening and at its peak in the 1960s, it was the third busiest port in Britain.

=== Trafford Park ===
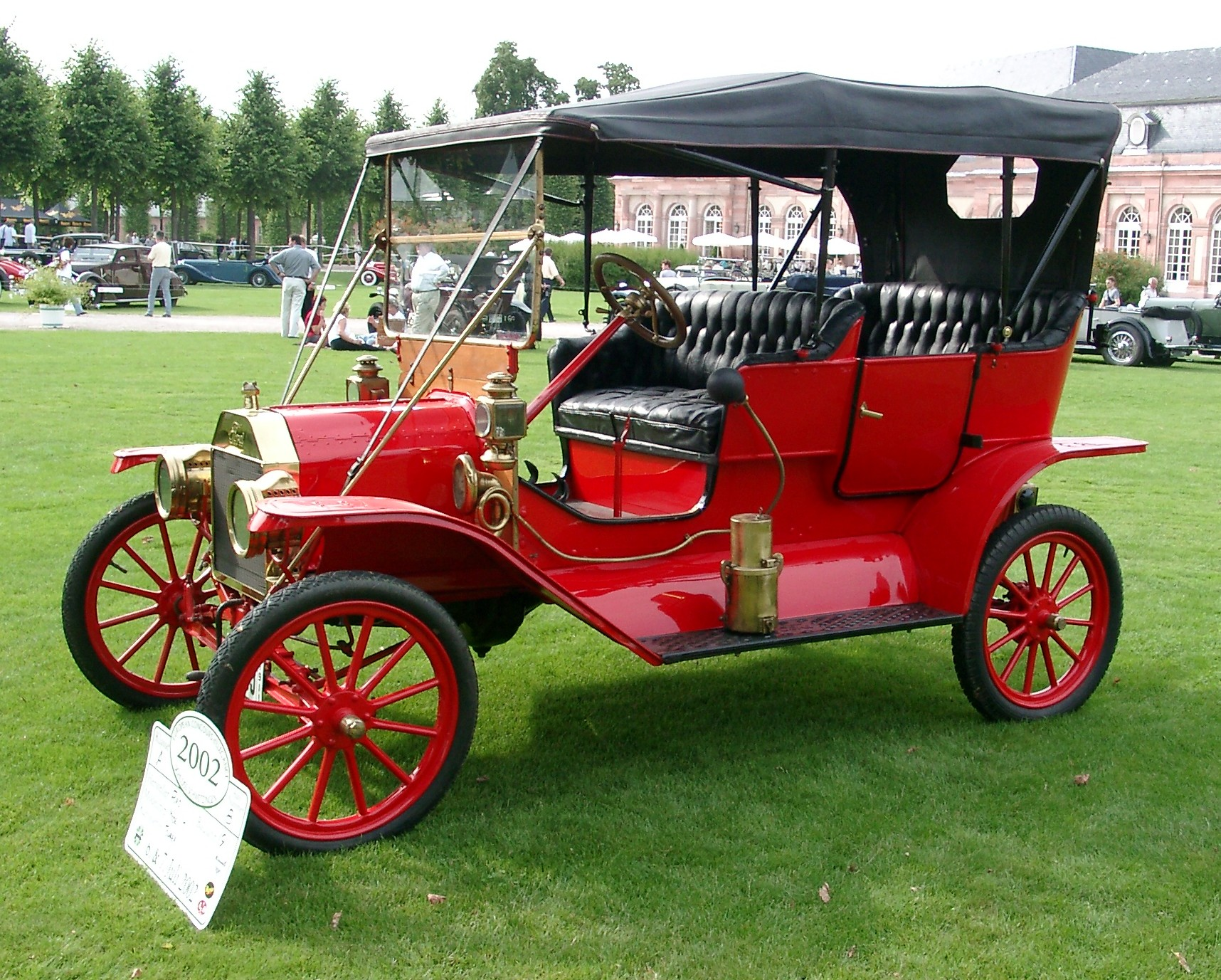
The Ford Model T, the first production factory outside America for the Model T was at Trafford Park in Manchester, bolstered by it logistic benefits of the Manchester Ship Canal.

As the ship canal was opened in 1894, plans were afoot for a new industrial estate, the first of its kind in the world. Two years after the opening of the ship canal, financier Ernest Terah Hooley bought the 1,183-acre (4,790,000 m^{2}) country estate belonging to Sir Humphrey Francis de Trafford for £360,000 (equivalent to £41.4 million in 2025). Hooley intended to develop the site, which was close to Manchester and at the end of the canal, as an exclusive housing estate, screened by woods from industrial units constructed along the 1.5-mile (2.4 km) frontage onto the canal.

With the predicted traffic for the canal slow to materialise, Hooley and Marshall Stevens (the general manager of the Ship Canal Company) came to see the benefits that the industrial development of Trafford Park could offer to both the ship canal and the estate. In January 1897, Stevens became the managing director of Trafford Park Estates, where he remained until 1930, latterly as its joint chairman and managing director.

Within five years, Trafford Park, Europe's largest industrial estate, was home to forty firms. The earliest structures on the canal side were grain silos; the grain was used for flour and as ballast for ships carrying raw cotton. The wooden silo built opposite No.9 Dock in 1898 (destroyed in the Manchester Blitz in 1940) was Europe's largest grain elevator. The CWS bought land on Trafford Wharf in 1903, where it opened a bacon factory and a flour mill. In 1906 it bought the Sun Mill, which it extended in 1913 to create the UK's largest flour mill, with its own wharf, elevators and silos.

Inland from the canal the British Westinghouse Electric Company bought 11 per cent of the estate. Westinghouse's American architect Charles Henry Heathcote was responsible for much of the planning and design of their factory, which built steam turbines and turbo generators. By 1899 Heathcote had also designed fifteen warehouses for the Manchester Ship Canal Company. Engineering companies such as Ford and Metropolitan-Vickers had a large presence at Trafford Park alongside non-engineering companies such Kellogg's who remain to this day. Trafford Park was also home to the first Ford production plant for their revolutionary Model T car outside of the United States.

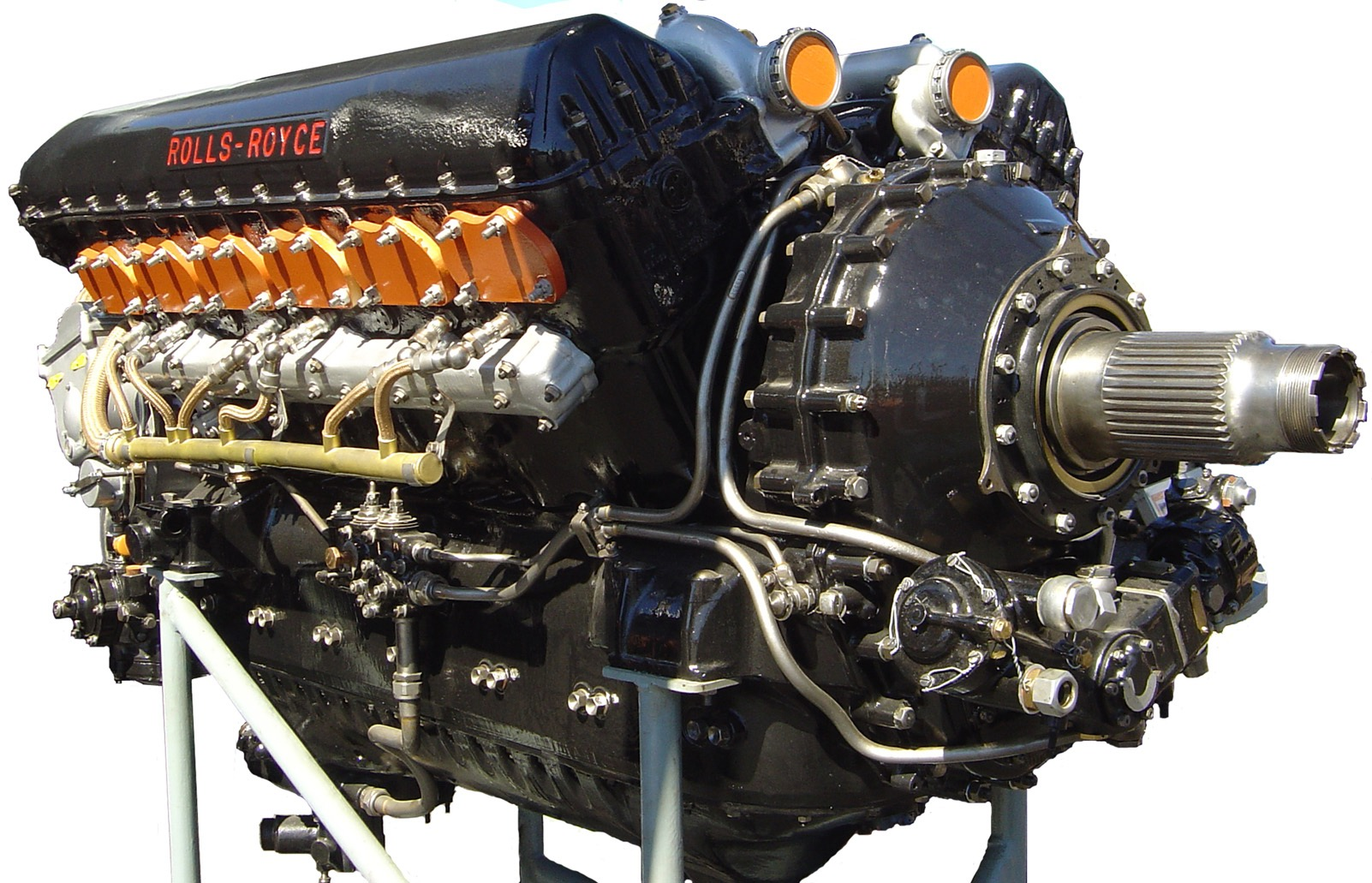
The Rolls-Royce Merlin engine, produced en masse during World War II at Ford's Trafford Park plant.

During World War II, Trafford Park became an important centre for the manufacture and development in engineering in the aim of giving Britain a technological advantage over its enemies. Having an abandoned factory in Trafford Park, Ford of Britain was approached about the possibility of converting it into an aircraft engine production unit by Herbert Austin, who was in charge of the shadow factory plan. Building work on a new factory was started in May 1940 on a 118-acre (48 ha) site, while Ford engineers went on a fact-finding mission to Derby. Their chief engineer commented to Sir Stanley Hooker that the tolerances used were far too wide for them, and so the 20,000 drawings would need to be redrawn to Ford tolerance levels, which took over a year. Ford's factory was built with two distinct sections to minimise potential bomb damage, it was completed in May 1941 and bombed in the same month. At first, the factory had difficulty in attracting suitable labour, and large numbers of women, youths, and untrained men had to be taken on. Despite this, the first Merlin engine came off the production line one month later, and it was building the engine at a rate of 200 per week by 1943, at which point the joint factories were producing 18,000 Merlins per year. Ford’s investment in machinery and the redesign resulted in the 10,000 man-hours needed to produce a Merlin dropping to 2,727 in three years, while unit cost fell from £6,540 in June 1941 to £1,180 by the war’s end. In his autobiography Not much of an Engineer, Sir Stanley Hooker states: "... once the great Ford factory at Manchester started production, Merlins came out like shelling peas. The percentage of engines rejected by the Air Ministry was zero. Not one engine of the 30,400 produced was rejected ...". Some 17,316 people worked at the Trafford Park plant, including 7,260 women and two resident doctors and nurses. Merlin production started to run down in August 1945, and finally ceased on 23 March 1946.

The Ship Canal is now past its heyday, but still sits at Europe's largest industrial estate, Trafford Park, and there are plans to increase shipping. Its importance highlighted by the engineering achievement that was the Manchester Ship Canal, the only ship canal in Britain and growth of the first industrial estate in the world in Trafford Park.

== 20th century ==
=== The 'Nuclear Family' ===
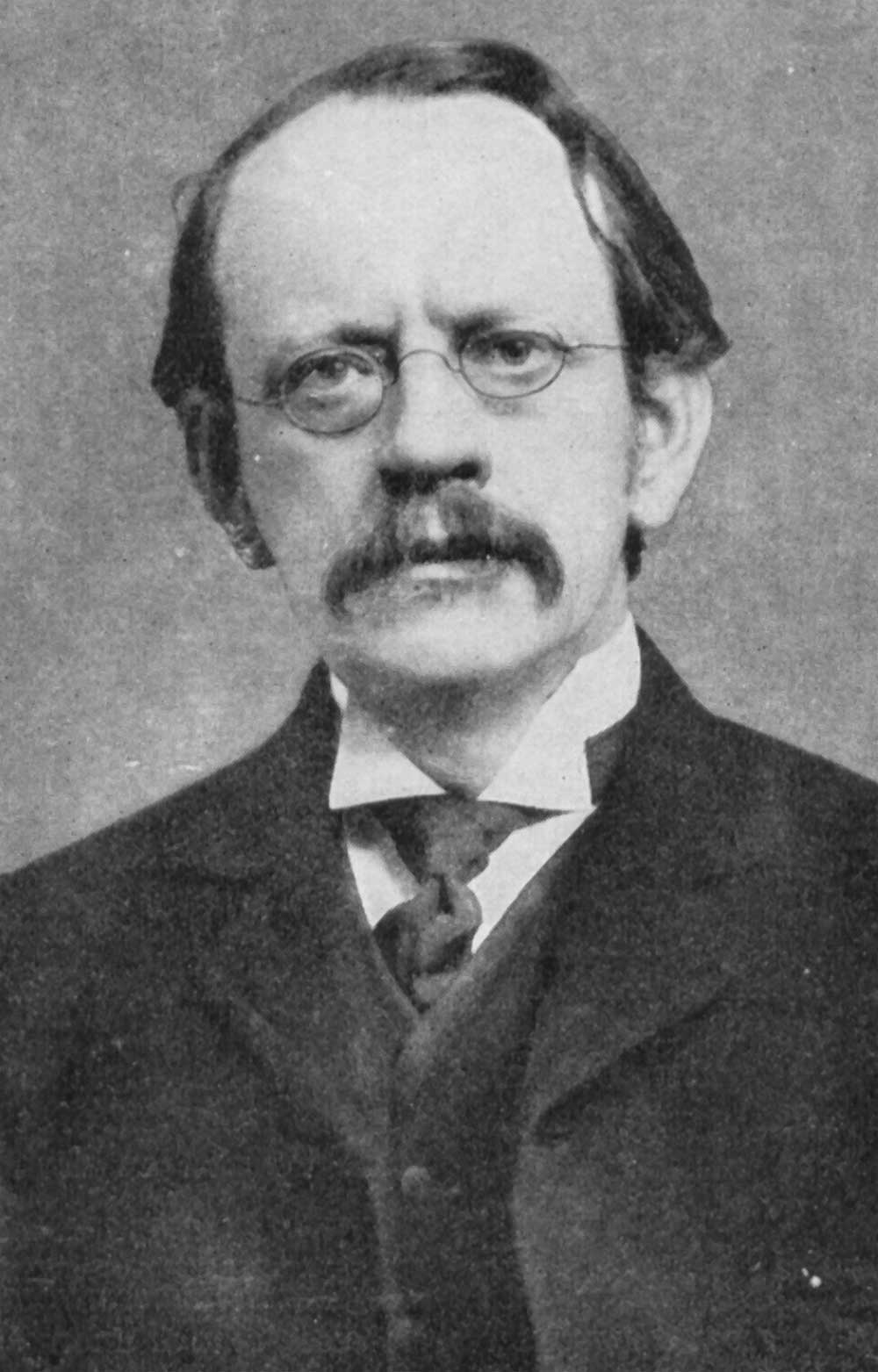
J. J. Thomson, Manchester-born physicist who is credited with the discovery of the electron and isotopes

In the late 19th and early 20th century, Manchester gained a pioneering reputation for a city at the centre of physics, namely in the field of nuclear physics. The 'Nuclear Family' was the alias given to a group of scientists who studied nuclear physics in Manchester. 'Family' highlights the consistent development through the generations in nuclear physics, beginning with Thomson in the late 18th century and ending with James Chadwick in the 1930s, who discovered the neutron. Ernest Rutherford is often described as the 'father of nuclear physics', equally the same could be said of J. J. Thomson, who discovered the electron and isotopes, and ultimately taught Rutherford, who later went on to split the atom. Scientists who were part of the 'nuclear family' in Manchester included J. J. Thomson, Ernest Rutherford, Niels Bohr, Hans Geiger, Ernest Marsden, John Cockcroft and James Chadwick.

J. J. Thomson, a Manchester-born physicist hailing from Cheetham Hill, who enrolled to Owens College as a 14-year-old. Thomson would go on to discover the electron in 1897 and isotope, as well as inventing the mass spectrometer. All of this contributed to his award of the Nobel Prize in Physics in 1906. Thomson also proposed the plum pudding model, which was later confirmed as scientifically incorrect by Rutherford.

In 1907, Ernest Rutherford, a scientist who had been taught by Thomson at the University of Cambridge, moved to Manchester to become chair of physics at the Victoria University of Manchester. Rutherford hypothesised the Rutherford model, which was later improved on by Niels Bohr who proposed the Bohr model. Rutherford would later have a great influence on students such as Niels Bohr, Hans Geiger, Ernest Marsden and James Chadwick. Rutherford's main work would come in 1917 when he would 'split the atom'.

=== Aviation ===
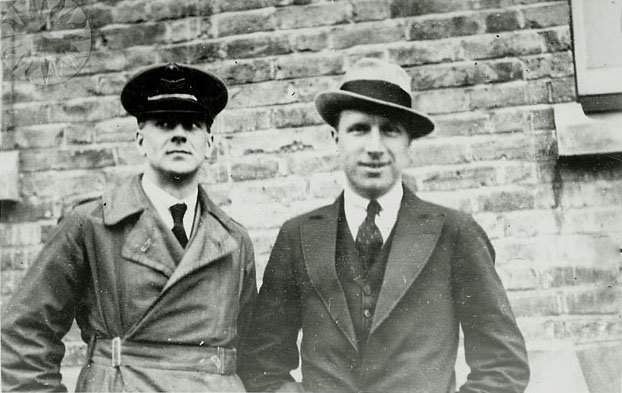
Arthur Whitten Brown and Manchester-born John Alcock in 1919.

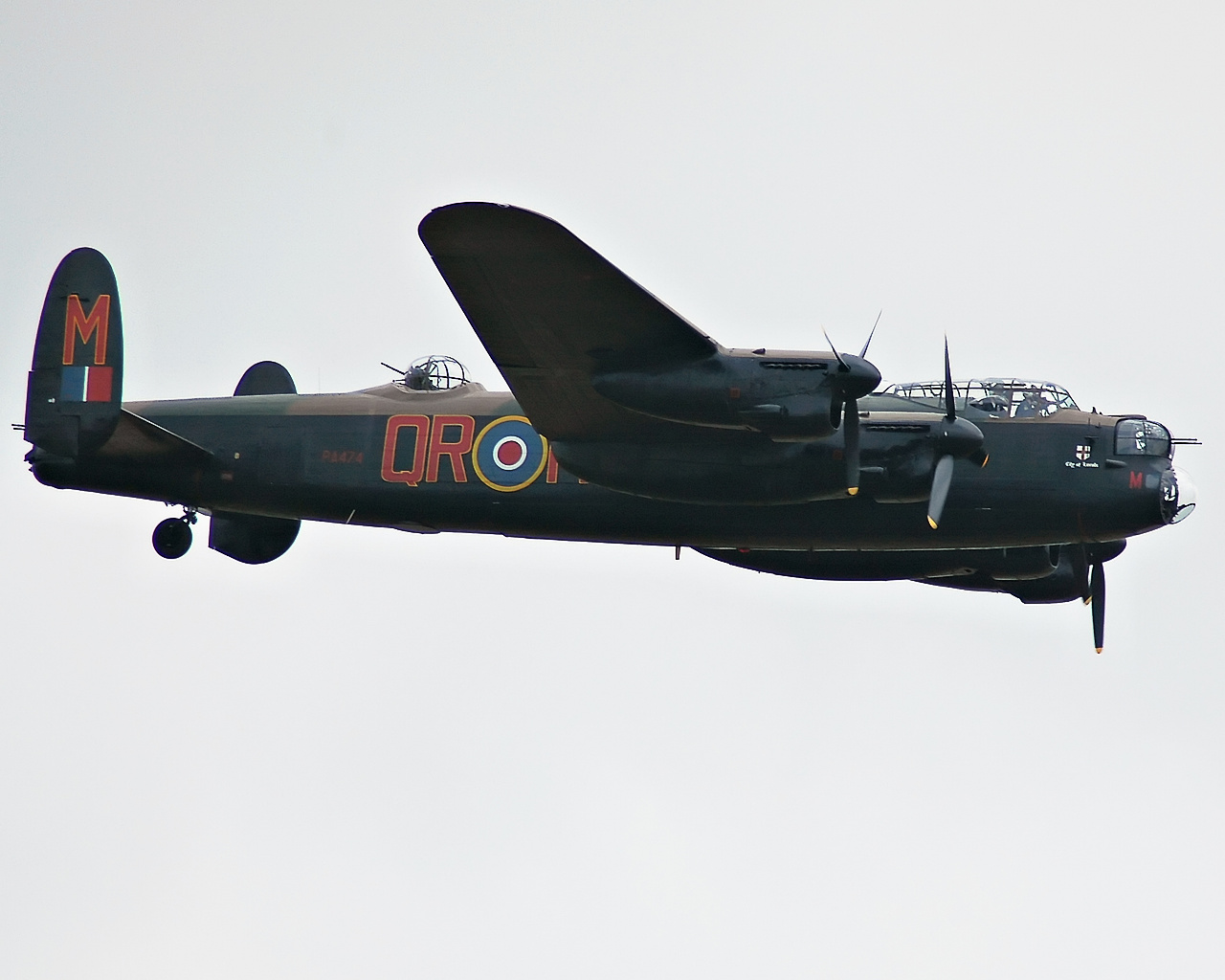
The Lancaster and Vulcan were both designed by Avro at various sites around Manchester.

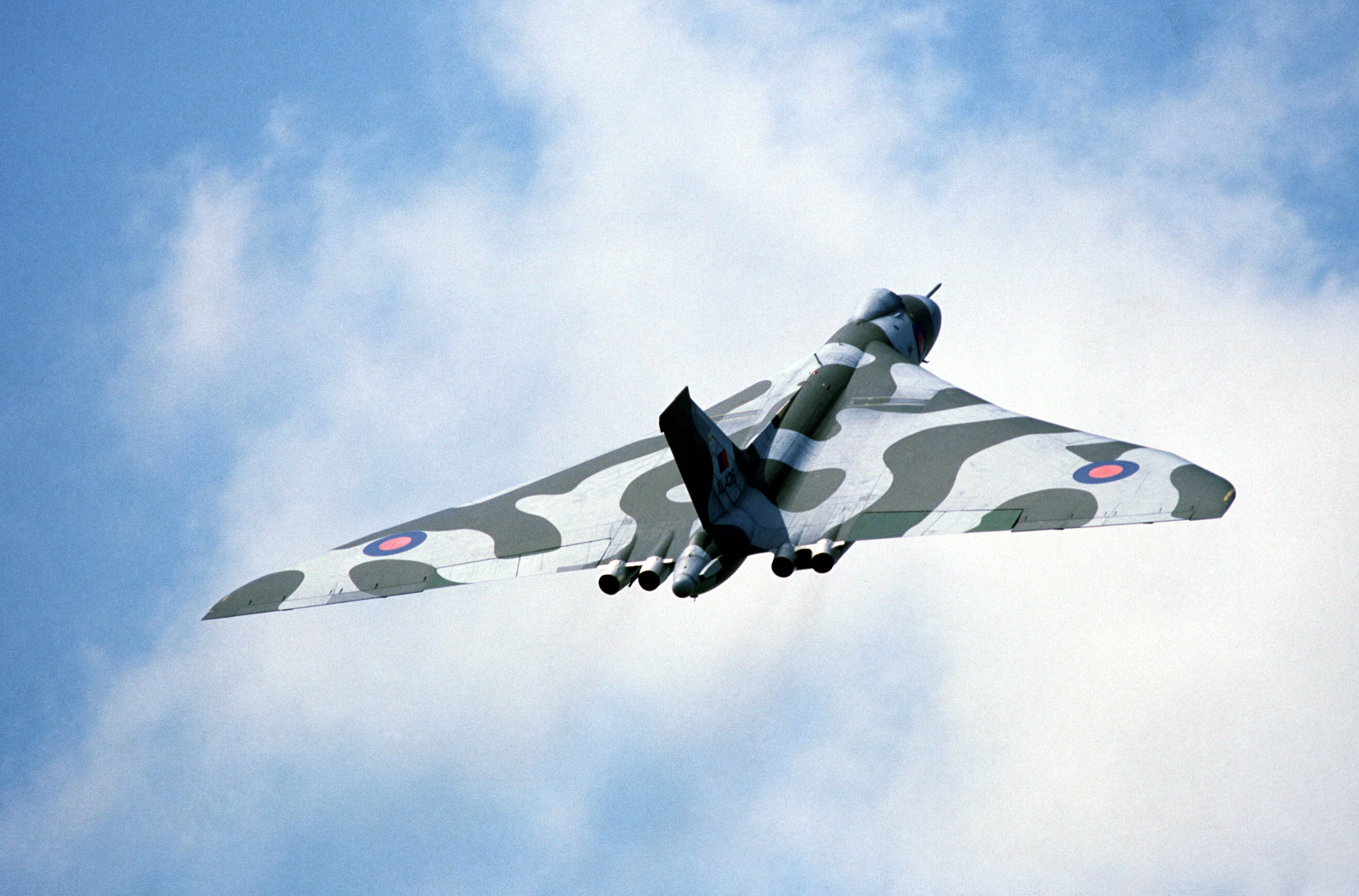
The Lancaster was also an improved version of the Avro Manchester.

From the advent of aviation at the beginning of the 20th century, Manchester has been home to a number of famous aviation companies, most notably Avro.

In 1910, French aviator Louis Paulhan flew from London to Manchester in approximately 12 hours. Paulhan won the first Daily Mail aviation prizes, which offered the prize in 1906.

Jack Alcock was born on 5 November 1892 at Seymour Grove, Old Trafford, Stretford, England. He attended St Thomas's primary school in Heaton Chapel, Stockport. He first became interested in flying at the age of seventeen. In 1910 he became an assistant to Works Manager Charles Fletcher, an early Manchester aviator and Norman Crossland, a motor engineer and founder of Manchester Aero Club. It was during this period that Alcock met the Frenchman Maurice Ducrocq who was both a demonstration pilot and UK sales representative for aero engines made by Spirito Mario Viale in Italy.

Ducrocq took Alcock on as a mechanic at the Brooklands aerodrome, Surrey, where he learned to fly at Ducrocq's flying school, gaining his pilot's licence there in November 1912. By summer 1914 he was proficient enough to compete in a Hendon-Birmingham-Manchester and return air race, flying a Farman biplane. He landed at Trafford Park Aerodrome and flew back to Hendon the same day. Alcock became an experienced military pilot and instructor during World War I with the Royal Naval Air Service, although he was shot down during a bombing raid and taken prisoner in Turkey.

After the war, Alcock wanted to continue his flying career and took up the challenge of attempting to be the first to fly directly across the Atlantic. Alcock and Arthur Whitten Brown took off from St John's, Newfoundland, at 1:45 pm local time on 14 June 1919, and landed in Derrygimla bog near Clifden, Ireland, 16 hours and 12 minutes later on 15 June 1919 after flying 1,980 miles (3,186 km). The flight had been much affected by bad weather, making accurate navigation difficult; the intrepid duo also had to cope with turbulence, instrument failure and ice on the wings. The flight was made in a modified Vickers Vimy bomber, and won a £10,000 prize offered by London's Daily Mail newspaper for the first non-stop flight across the Atlantic. His grave in Southern Cemetery, Manchester is marked by a large stone memorial alongside other famous Mancunian figures. He is buried in grave space "Church of England, Section G, Grave Number 966", alongside 4 other individuals: John Alcock, Mary Alcock, Edward Samson Alcock and Elsie Moseley.

In 1910, Eccles-born Alliott Verdon Roe founded Avro on at Brownsfield Mill on Great Ancoats Street in Manchester city centre. Alongside, Farnworth-born aircraft designer Roy Chadwick, Avro would go on to design some recognisable British aircraft of the 20th century. The Avro Lancaster bomber, devised for World War II was a redeveloped version of the Avro Manchester and subsequently became the most important British aircraft of the war alongside the Supermarine Spitfire.

=== Astronomy ===
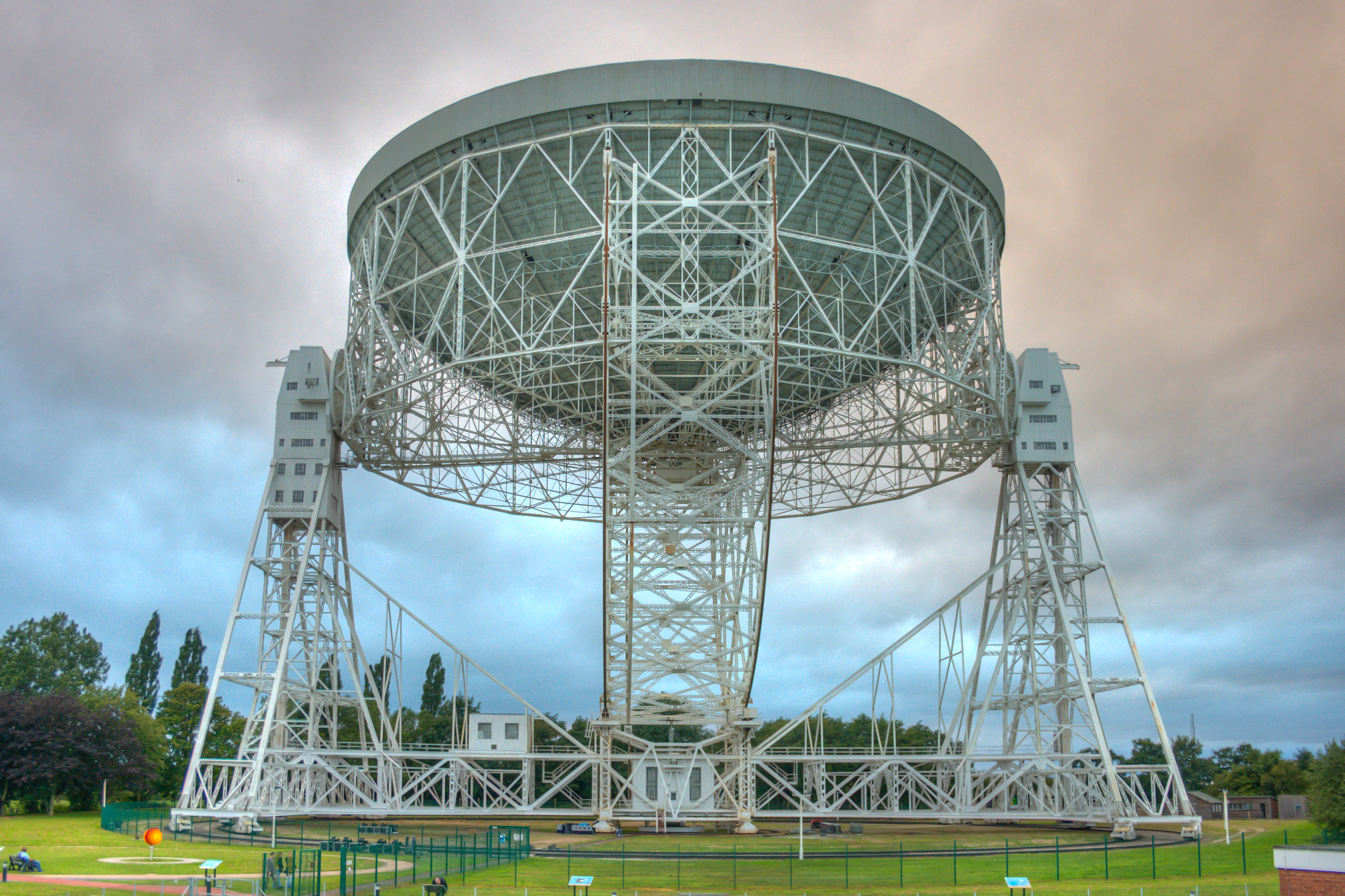
The Lovell Telescope at Jodrell Bank Observatory.

In the 1930s, Bernard Lovell, an astronomer, moved to Manchester to become a research fellow on the cosmic ray research team at the Victoria University of Manchester. He spent wartime years working on developing radar systems and the like to assist in the war effort. After the war, he continued his studies in cosmic rays, but background radiation and light in the large Manchester impeded his work. He decided to push for funding for a large radio telescope which would be based away from the city on the Cheshire Plain south of Manchester at the Jodrell Bank Observatory.

Funding was granted from the Nuffield Foundation with some contribution from the government, and soon an 89-metre height structure, which was the largest telescope in the world at the time of construction, was operational in 1957.

The telescope became operational in October 1957, which was just before the launch of Sputnik 1, the world's first artificial satellite. Only the Soviet hierarchy was aware of Sputnik, and it was the Lovell Telescope that tracked the satellite. While the transmissions from Sputnik itself could easily be picked up by a household radio, the Lovell Telescope was the only telescope capable of tracking Sputnik's booster rocket by radar; it first located it just before midnight on 12 October 1957. It also located Sputnik 2's carrier rocket at just after midnight on 16 November 1957. Jodrell Bank continued tracking new artificial satellites in the following years, and also doubled up as a long range ballistic missile radar system, a beneficial trait which helped the telescope gain funding from the British government. The Jodrell Bank Observatory is currently operated by the University of Manchester and was nominated for UNESCO World Heritage Status in 2011.

=== Computing ===
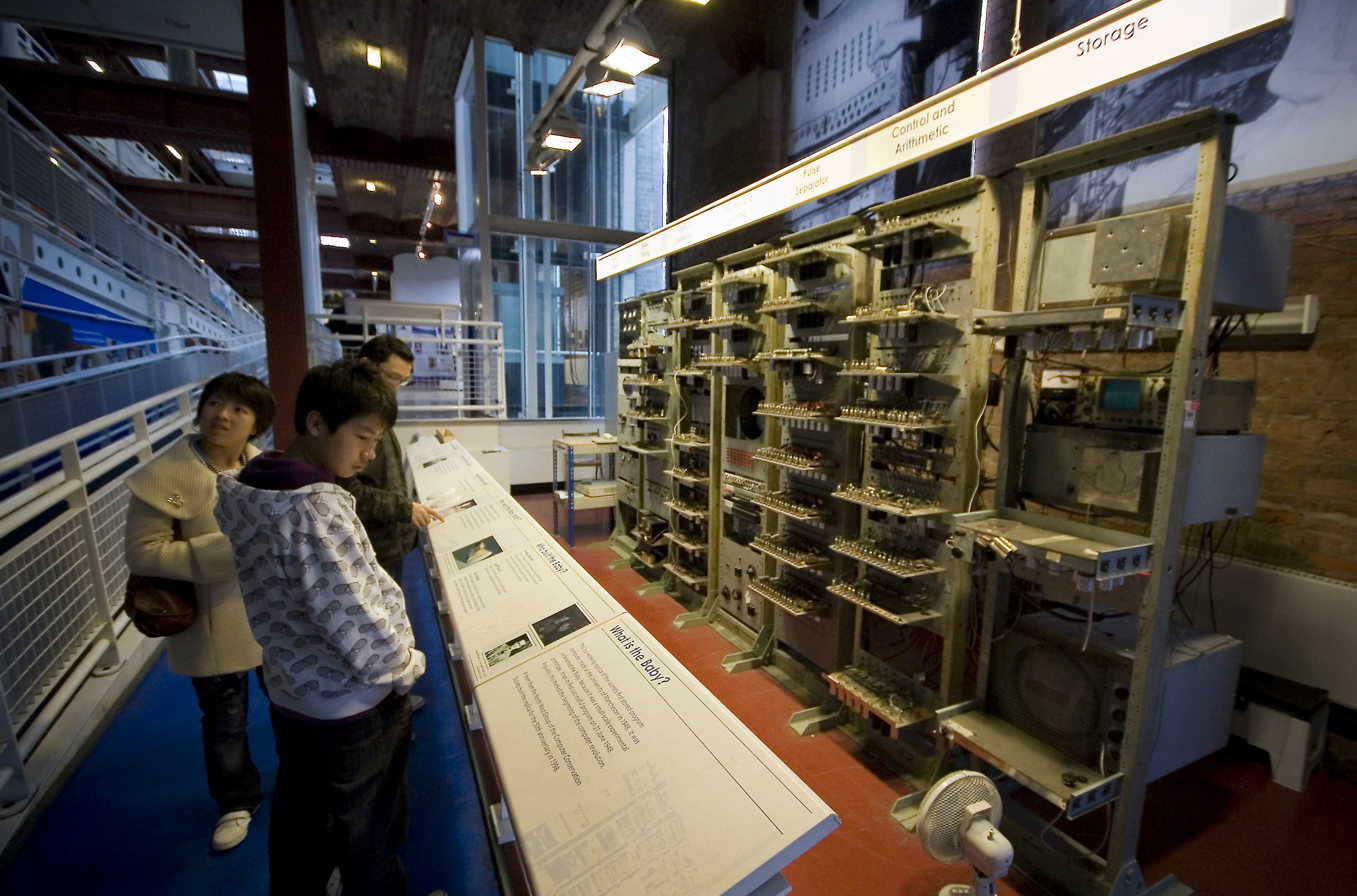
Replica of the Manchester Baby, the world's first electronic stored-program computer

In December 1946, Stockport-born Frederic Calland Williams returned to Manchester to head the Electrical Engineering department at the Victoria University of Manchester. Williams also recruited Tom Kilburn, with whom he worked at the Telecommunications Research Establishment during World War II. Both worked on perfecting the cathode ray tube, which Kilburn worked on. They eventually came up with the Williams tube, which allowed the storage of binary data. Consequently both worked on the Manchester Baby and on the 21 June 1948, the machine was switched on. Despite its low performance by modern standards – the Baby only had a 32-bit word length and a memory of 32 words – it was the first computer capable of storing data in the world and was breakthrough in the computer science world.

The Baby had provided a feasible design, and development began on a more usable and practical computer in the Manchester Mark 1. Joined by Alan Turing, the university continued development, and by October 1949, the Mark 1 was finished. The computer ran successfully, error-free, on the 16 and 17 June 1949. Thirty-five patents resulted from the computer and the successful implementation of an index register.

=== First test-tube baby ===
In 1978, after a decade of research by Manchester-born Robert G. Edwards and his colleague, Patrick Steptoe, Louise Brown, the world's first baby conceived by in vitro fertilisation. Louise Brown, was born at 11:47 pm on 25 July 1978 at the Oldham General Hospital and made medical history: in vitro fertilization meant a new way to help infertile couples who formerly had no possibility of having a baby.

Refinements in technology have increased pregnancy rates and it is estimated that in 2010 about 4 million children have been born by IVF with approximately 170,000 coming from donated oocyte and embryos In 2010, Robert G. Edwards was awarded the Nobel Prize in Physiology or Medicine "for the development of in vitro fertilization".

== 21st century ==
=== Graphene ===
In 2010, Andre Geim and Konstantin Novoselov, physicists at the University of Manchester won the Nobel Prize in Physics for their work on graphene. Successfully isolated in 2004, research and development continues on the 'miracle material' today to find practical, everyday uses for the material. The following year in 2011, the British government announced £50 million of funding to allow further development of graphene in the United Kingdom.

== See also ==
- Museum of Science and Industry, Manchester
