= George S. V. Wills =

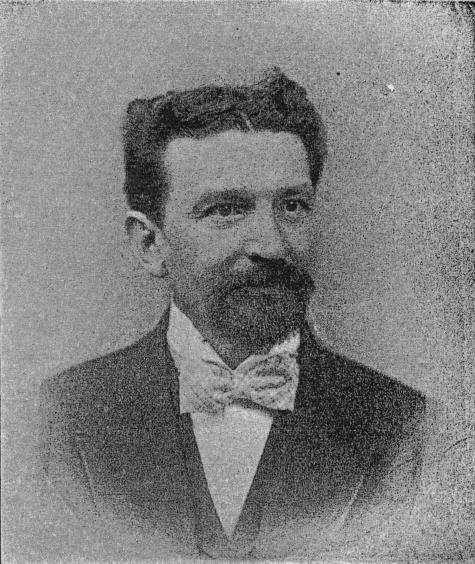
- George Sampson Valentine Wills
- Born: George Samuel V. Wills; 14 February 1849; Roade, Northamptonshire
- Died: 28 April 1932 (aged 83); London
- Occupation(s): Pharmacist, educator, author
- Known for: Founder of the Westminster College of Chemistry and Pharmacy

George Sampson Valentine Wills (14 February 1849 – 28 April 1932) was a chemist and pharmacist and the founder of the Westminster College of Chemistry and Pharmacy, an institution which prepared students for examinations set by the Pharmaceutical Society of Great Britain, founded in 1841.

== Early life ==
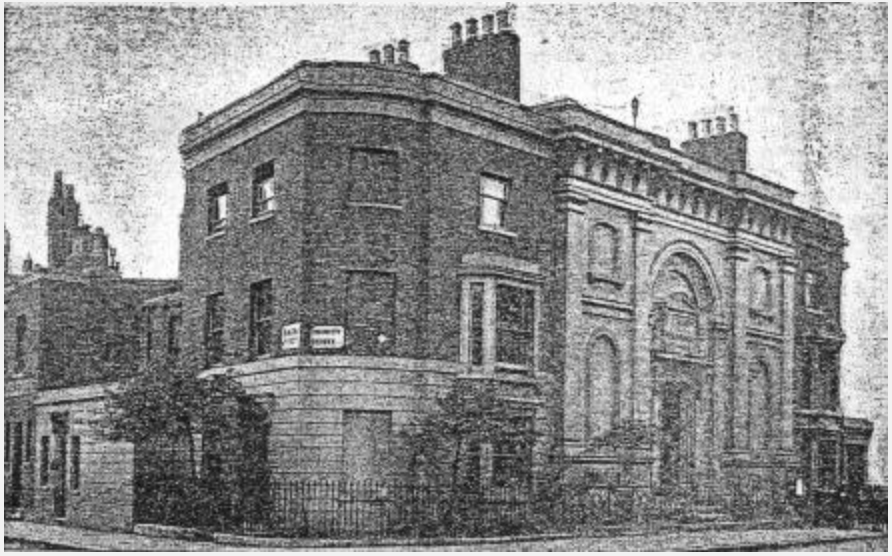
Westminster College of Chemistry and Pharmacy, Trinity Street, Southwark. From the Prospectus and syllabus of the Westminster College of Chemistry and Pharmacy, London, 1901.

George Sampson Valentine Wills was born on 14 February 1849 in the village of Roade in Northamptonshire, England. He was the son of stonemason Jabez Wills and the grandson of George Wills, a stonemason from Buckinghamshire. His mother Catherine Hickson was the daughter of a local labourer, William Hickson. Later, Wills was educated in Stony Stratford, Buckinghamshire and, after leaving school, in 1866, Wills was apprenticed to a local chemist and druggist.

== Career ==
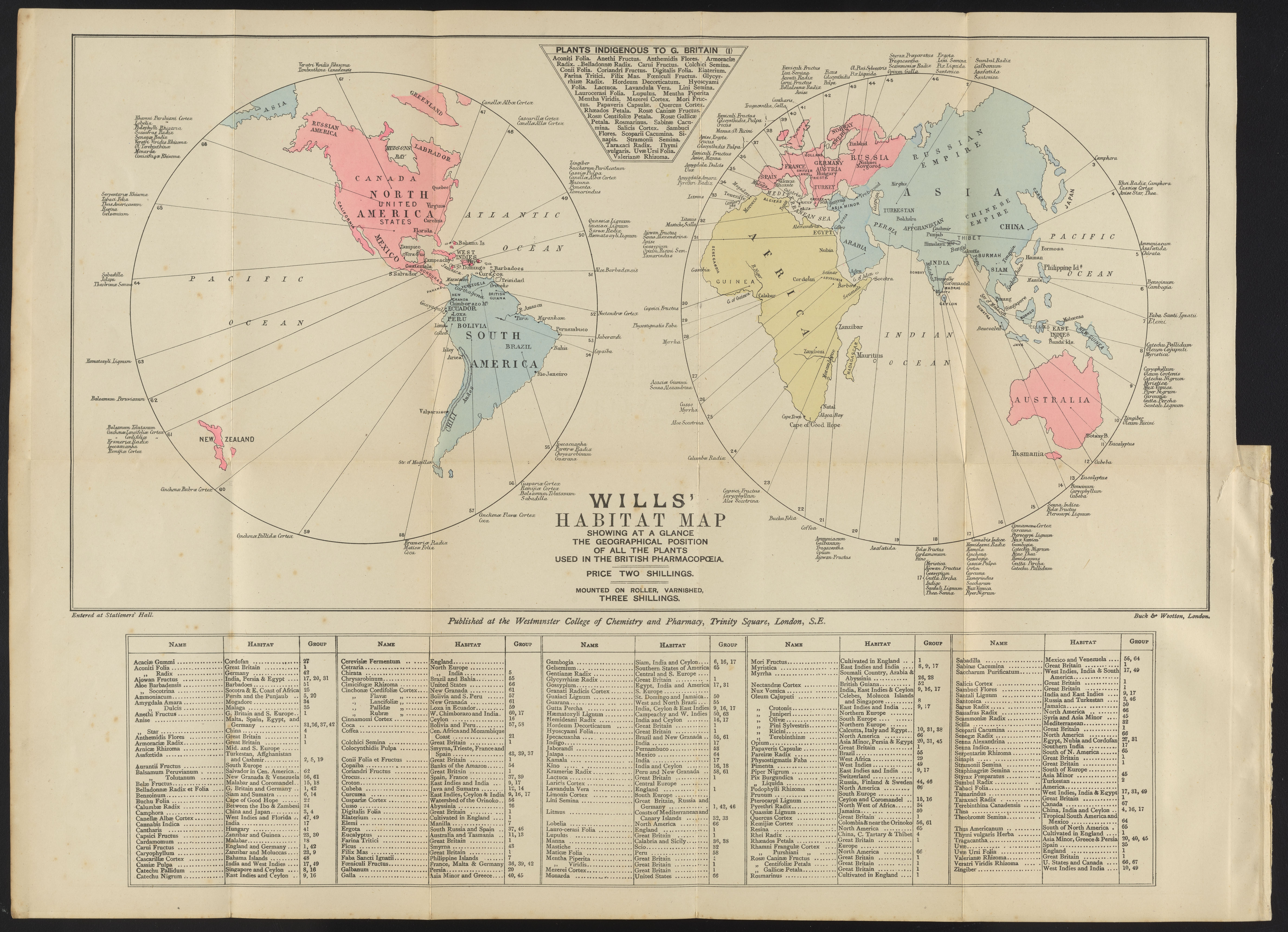
George Wills habitat map from the Manual of Vegetable Materia Medica (1886)

In October 1874 Wills founded the Westminster College of Chemistry and Pharmacy, initially located in his house at 133 St George's Road, Lambeth, London. Students of the college took the examination of the Pharmaceutical Society of Great Britain, founded in 1841.

By 1877 the college was able to make the claim that it was the largest school of its kind in London. In addition, its students had achieved almost as many examination passes as all the other schools in England put together.

In 1880 Wills published a book titled Elements of Pharmacy.

In 1882, as his student body expanded, Wills moved Westminster College into new premises, a defunct Baptist chapel in Trinity Street, Southwark.

In 1899 Wills self-published a memoir titled The Works of George S. V. Wills and The Westminster College of Chemistry and Pharmacy.

== Death and legacy ==
George Sampson Valentine Wills died at 5 Lessar Avenue, Clapham Park on 28 April 1932, aged 84. He is buried in Kensal Green Cemetery, Kensal Green, London.
