= Levinstein Ltd =

British dye company

Levinstein Ltd was an important Manchester-based British dye-making company founded by Ivan Levinstein in 1865 and incorporated as a limited company in 1895. Ivan died in 1916 and the company was taken over by his son Herbert Levinstein.

In 1918 the firm became part of British Dyestuffs Corporation, which in turn formed part of Imperial Chemical Industries in 1926. The firm had operations in Salford, Hulton House in Blackley, and during World War I a sequestered German-owned plant in Ellesmere Port. The firm made the successful Blackley blue or Coomassie brilliant blue, a Manchester brown, a Manchester yellow dye, and during WWI chemicals for military purposes (including mustard gas made by the eponymous Levinstein process).

== Products ==
Coomassie brilliant blue

Manchester brown

== See also ==
- Hexagon Tower
- Claus and Co.
