= Society of Dyers and Colourists =

UK professional society

Logo

The Society of Dyers and Colourists (SDC) is an international professional society, with headquarters in Bradford, England, specializing in colour in all its manifestations, but particularly in relation to textiles. Founded in 1884, with Ivan Levinstein among it's founding members it was granted a Royal Charter of Incorporation in 1963. The SDC is a registered charity.

The SDC deliver courses and qualifications up to degree level (given their Royal Charter) as benchmarked by Ecctis in the UK. These are the ASDC, TCC & FTCC. They also deliver a programme of webinars which are recorded and made available post-event. The members hold regional meetings across the UK and also overseas.

Since 1884 SDC have published the Journal of the Society of Dyers and Colourists, a journal relaunched in 1999 as Coloration Technology.

The Society is a member of the Science Council.

== Coat of Arms ==
The College of Arms granted the SDC the following coat of arms:

Coat of arms of Society of Dyers and Colourists

Granted
20 December 1956
Coronet
Bishop's Mitre
Crest
On a wreath Or and purpure, A Purple Iris flower proper.
Escutcheon
Tierce in pairle reversed purpure, Or, and azure, in chief a madder plant eradicated gold and a slip of indigo leaved and fructed also azure and in base between two slips of the grain tree leaved also gold a hexagon argent voided of the field.
Supporters
On the dexter side a female figure representing the goddess Iris, habited argent with wings Or and holding in the exterior hand a caduceus proper, and on the sinister side a male figure representing a craftsman of the dyer's trade in seventeenth century habit proper, holding in the exterior hand a hank of silk also Or.
Motto
Scientia coloris ministra.
Symbolism
The arms were officially granted on December 20, 1956.

The shield incorporates several elements used in the design of the Presidential Badge of the Society presented in 1951 by the Worshipful Company of Dyers of the City of London. The shield is divided into three areas of heraldic colour, with purpure and or in the upper areas and azure in the lower. These approximate to the subtractive primary colours.

In the lower area is a silver hexagonal benzene ring, symbolising the chemical and technical achievements of the industry, placed between two slips of the grain-tree. In the upper areas are placed emblems representing the madder and indigo plants respectively.

The dexter supporter is the goddess Iris, who, as a messenger of the gods, had the rainbow as one of her symbols. She was, in fact, accepted as the goddess of the rainbow, which, in this case, is symbolic of colour in general. As a messenger of the gods she carries in her right hand a caduceus or herald's staff. The sinister supporter is a dyer in seventeenth-century attire holding a skein of silk.

The crest is a purple iris flowering on a wreath of gold and purple, the allusion being to the dexter supporter already described.

The Latin motto Scientia Coloris Ministra ("Science is the Servant of Colour") refers in general terms to the aims both of the Society and of the industry as a whole.
