= Ivan Levinstein =

German-born UK chemist

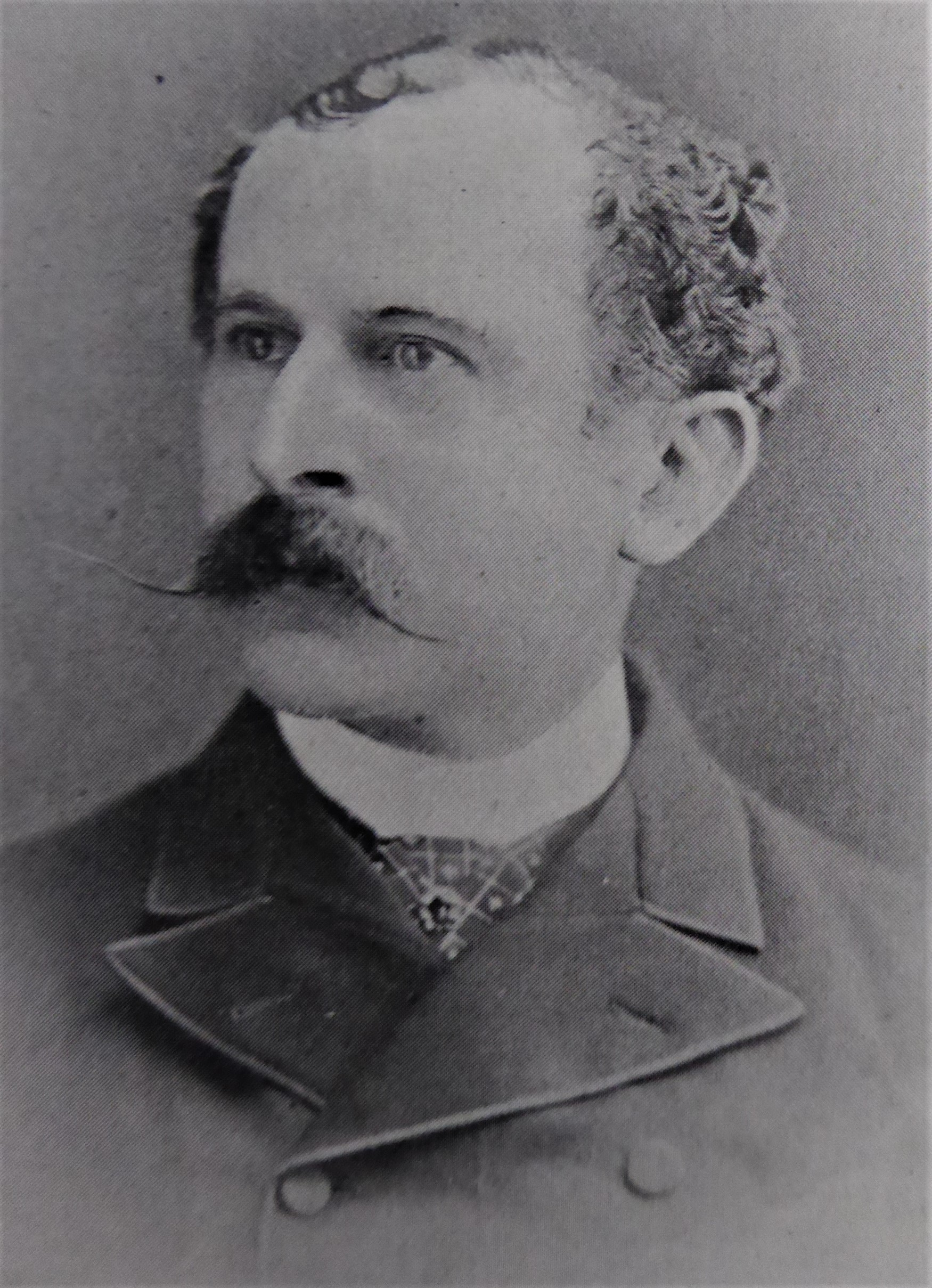
Ivan Levinstein c.1898

Ivan Levinstein (1845–1916) was a German-born British chemist who pioneered the manufacture of synthetic dyes and helped develop the British chemical industry in the late nineteenth century. He was born in Charlottenburg, Germany, the son of a Berlin Calico manufacturer, studied chemistry at the Gewerbeinstitut, which later became Technische Universität Berlin, before joining the family business. He obtained his first patent in Germany in 1863 for improvements in manufacturing coal tar dyes.

In 1864 he moved to Blackley, Manchester to start his own chemical manufacturing business. Levinstein Ltd was an important Manchester based British dye-making company

As the business grew it moved to larger premises in Crumpsall, Manchester, in 1887. He developed Rosaline, an artificial magenta dye, Blackley blue dye, Manchester Brown and Manchester Yellow dyes and red azo dyes.

He also acted as a spokesperson for the British chemical industry, expressing concerns about growing German competitiveness. He founded, in 1871, the Chemical Review, in 1881 was a founder of the Manchester Section of the Society of Chemical Industry, later following Henry Roscoe as Chair of the Section. He also served as President of the Society of Chemical Industry between 1901 and 1903 and was a founder member of the Society of Dyers and Colourists in 1884. and elected to the Manchester Literary and Philosophical Society on 5 March 1895.

Ivan's son Herbert Levinstein was a chemist who took over his father's dye manufacturing works.

== Other sources ==
Wyler, M. (1937) Ivan Levinstein - What I Know of Him (Manchester, 1937), reprinted in Journal of the Society of Dyers and Colourists, SS (1939), 142-146.
