= James Farmer (industrialist) =

English manufacturer (1823–1892)

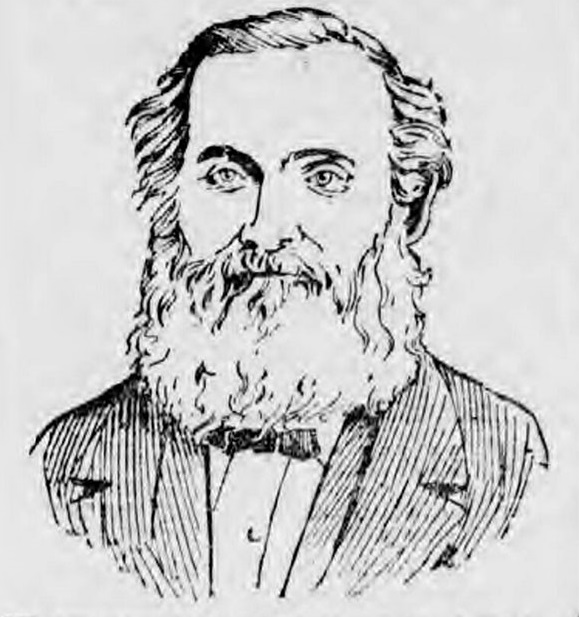
Sir James Farmer, from his Manchester Times obituary in 1892

Sir James Farmer (28 October 1823 – 21 October 1892) was an English manufacturer and the mayor of the County Borough of Salford, England, for two terms between 1885 and 1887.

== Businessman ==
James Farmer was born on 28 October 1823 and was a lifelong resident of the Salford borough. With prior experience as a calico printer, he invented a new printing mechanism and established a business as millwrights and engineers. At the time of his death, this was operating from Adelphi Street as a partnership and was known as Sir James Farmer and Sons. He had suffered a "lingering illness" and his sons — Andrew William Farmer and James Salter Farmer — had been in charge of business for some time. Although primarily concerned with manufacture of machinery for bleaching, cotton spinning and weaving in the textiles industries, in the years immediately preceding his death the business had diversified. Among the newer developments was machinery manufactured for the use and disposal of sewage.

== Politician ==
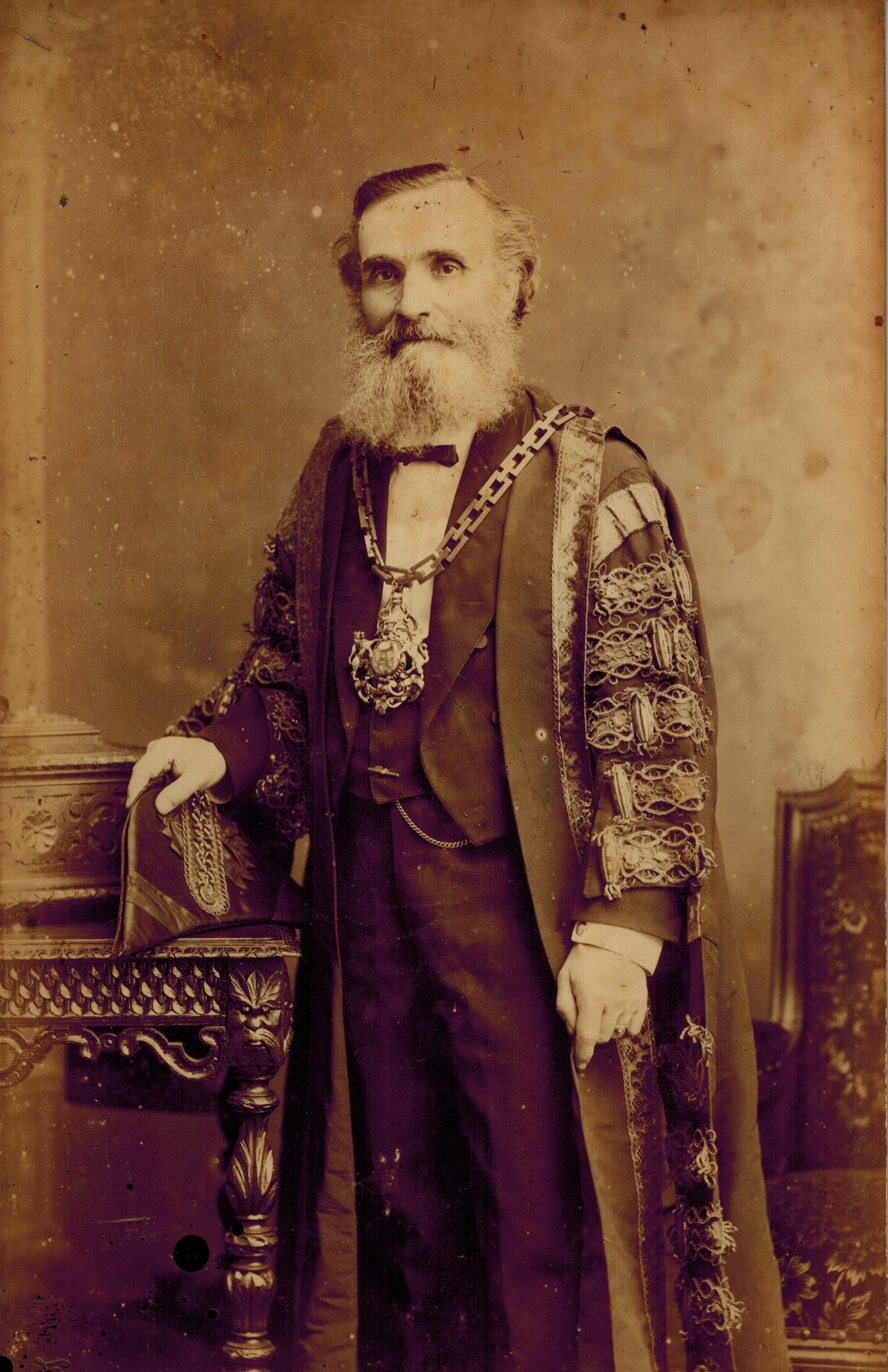
Photo of Sir James Farmer, Mayor of Salford, England, 1885

In late 1864, Farmer was elected as a member of Salford Corporation, the local government organisation for the borough, and remained on the council until his death. He was a member of the Conservative Party and, after 16 years as a councillor, he was made an alderman of the borough. In November 1885 he became mayor, at which time his past work for the council was described as being of "unobtrusive usefulness". He was reappointed to that office for a further year in 1886 and had to deal with significant local scandal concerning corruption at Salford Gas Works. His particular interests in local government were with regard to water supply — he was chairman of the Water Committee for over 25 years — and the fire brigade.

On 5 August 1887, Farmer was one of several incumbent mayors appointed a Knight Bachelor as part of the celebrations for the Golden Jubilee of Queen Victoria. Salford was then one of the largest boroughs in the country, although dwarfed by its neighbour, Manchester.

Farmer was also a Justice of the Peace in Salford and had been a founder director of the Clayton Aniline Company. He was a Congregationalist.

== Death and legacy ==
Soon after completing his second term as mayor, Farmer visited Australia with his two daughters in an attempt to improve his poor health. He died at his residence in Lytham St. Annes on 21 October 1892. His primary residence was Hope House in Eccles, from where he was taken for burial at Salford Cemetery. (Note: An advertisement for the sale of Hope House by auction appeared in September 1892. It said that Farmer was moving residence because of ill-health. Whether the auction was successful or the sale completed is unknown but sources at the time of his funeral refer to it as being his property.) His wife had died many years previously and his estate, valued at £20,170, was bequeathed mostly to his children.

The partnership of Sir James Farmer and Sons was converted into a limited company of the same name within a month of his death. The company proposed to carry on the prior business of "machinists, mechanical engineers, machine and engineering toolmakers, boilermakers, ironfounders, brassfounders, millwrights and metalworkers, and to buy, sell, manufacture, convert, let on hire, and deal in machinery, rolling stock, iron, steel, metal implements, tools, utensils and conveniences of all kinds". The share capital was £50,000 and the shareholders included both of his sons and also his brother, Christopher Atkinson Farmer, who for many years was manager of the partnership and also served as a Salford councillor.
