= Society of Chemical Industry =

Learned society in the United Kingdom

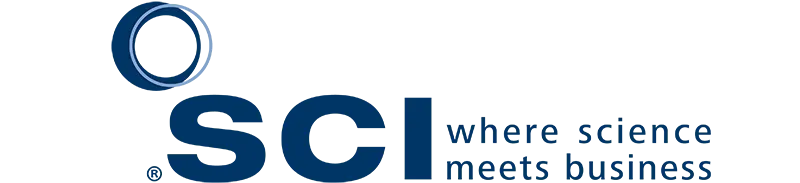
- Formation: 1881
- Type: Learned society
- Headquarters: London
- Location: United Kingdom
- Official language: English
- President: Paul Drechsler
- Website: www.soci.org

The Society of Chemical Industry (SCI) is a learned society set up in 1881 "to further the application of chemistry and related sciences for the public benefit".

== Offices ==
The society's headquarters is in Belgrave Square, London. There are semi-independent branches in the United States, Canada and Australia.

== Aims ==
The society aims to accelerate the rate of scientific innovations being commercialised by industry to benefit society. It does this through promoting collaborations between scientists and industrialists, running technical and innovation conferences, building communities across academia and industry and publishing scientific content through its journals and digital platforms.

It also promotes science education.

== History ==
On 21 November 1879, Lancashire chemist John Hargreaves canvassed a meeting of chemists and managers in Widnes, St Helens and Runcorn to consider the formation of a chemical society. Modelled on the successful Tyne Chemical Society already operating in Newcastle, the newly proposed South Lancashire Chemical Society held its first meeting on 29 January 1880 in Liverpool, with the eminent industrial chemist and soda manufacturer Ludwig Mond presiding.

It was quickly decided that the society should not be limited to just the local region and the title 'the Society of Chemical Industry’ was finally settled upon at a meeting in London on 4 April 1881, as being 'more inclusive'. Held at the offices of the Chemical Society, now the headquarters of the Royal Society of Chemistry, in Burlington House, this meeting was presided over by Henry Roscoe, appointed first president of SCI, and attended by Eustace Carey, Ludwig Mond, FA Abel, Lowthian Bell, William H Perkin, Walter Weldon, Edward Rider Cook, Thomas Tyrer and George E Davis; all prominent scientists, industrialists and MPs of the time.

The society grew rapidly, launching international and regional sections. In 1881 Ivan Levinstein was a founder of the Manchester Section of the Society of Chemical Industry, later following Sir Henry Roscoe as chair of the Section. Levinstein also served as president of the Society of Chemical Industry between 1901 and 1903.

Prominent early members included William Lever, George Matthey, Ludwig Mond, Henry Armstrong, Leo Baekeland, Rudolph Messel, Charles Tennant, Richard Seligman, Ferdinand Hurter and Marie Stopes.

=== Membership ===
The original membership fee was very steep for the time: The first subscription fee was set at one guinea, which would be equivalent to nearly £400 today. Four grades of membership were agreed at the time: member, associate, student and honorary, with most appointments made on the basis of a review of their 'eligibility' by the SCI council. Despite the high fee, by the time of the first official meeting of the Society of Chemical Industry in June 1881, it had attracted over 300 members.

=== Incorporation ===
An Extraordinary General Meeting was held on 27 March 1906, under the direction of president Edward Divers and secretary C. G. Cresswell, to discuss a motion to apply for incorporation under a royal charter. The resolution was formally proposed by Sir (Thomas) Boverton Redwood. After some discussion, the motion was unanimously supported. The society was formally incorporated, by Royal Charter, as of 17 June 1907, and its bylaws were published in the Journal of the Society of Chemical Industry. By that time, it had expanded to include a number of satellite chapters, including Canada, New South Wales, New York and New England as well as locations within Great Britain.

=== Headquarters ===
The first headquarters of the newly fledged Society of Chemical Industry was established in 1881 at Palace Chambers, Bridge Street, Westminster, London. After a series of changes of address, the society finally moved to its fifth and present location at 14/15 – and initially 16 – Belgrave Square in 1955. Owned by the Duke of Westminster, along with the rest of Belgravia, the building was and still is part of the Grosvenor Estate and had recently been commandeered by the Ministry of Defence during World War II. The former Nazi commander Rudolf Hess is believed to have been interrogated in the building after he flew to Britain late in the war.

== Activities and events ==
SCI organises over 100 conferences and events per year which are focused on cutting-edge scientific and special interest subjects. These are primarily organised through SCI member-led technical, international and regional interest groups.

SCI runs free Public Evening Lectures, both at its headquarters as well as online, through its SCITalks! programme.

The society has an extensive awards programmes designed to raise awareness of the benefits of the practical application of chemistry and related sciences across scientific disciplines and industrial sectors. The SCI also confers scholarships and travel bursaries to student members, and celebrates accomplished scientists, educators and business people through a number of international awards, medals, and lectureships.

== International groups ==
International groups include:

- Society of Chemical Industry (American Section)

== Journals ==
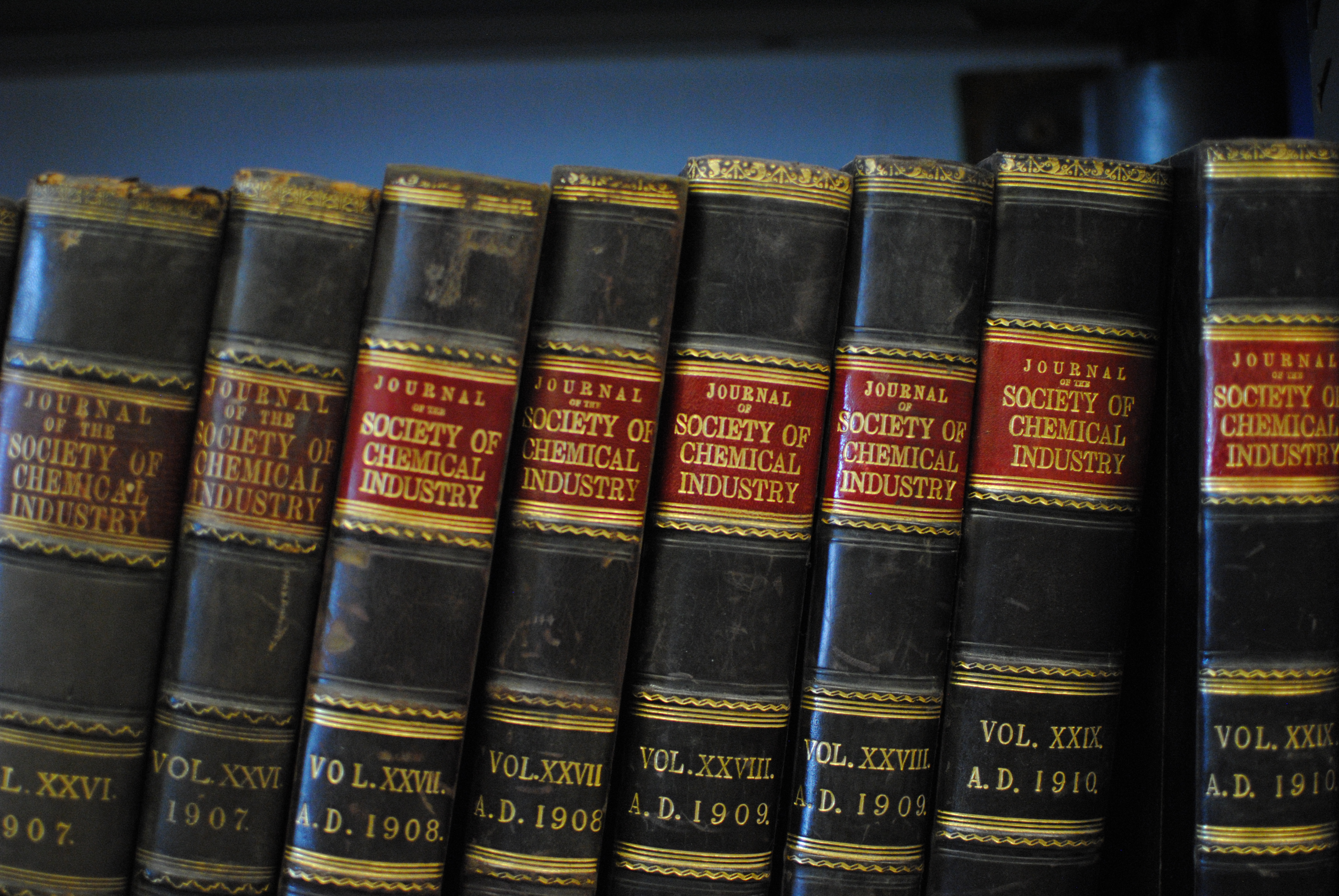
1907–1910 bound volumes of the Journal of the Society of Chemical Industry

The society publishes a number of peer-reviewed scientific journals in conjunction with John Wiley & Sons:

- Biofuels, Bioproducts and Biorefining
- Energy Science & Engineering ISSN 2050-0505
- Greenhouse Gases: Science and Technology ISSN 2152-3878
- Journal of Chemical Technology and Biotechnology
- Journal of the Science of Food and Agriculture
- Pest Management Science ISSN 1526-4998 and ISSN 1526-498X
- Polymer International ISSN 1097-0126 and ISSN 0959-8103
- SCI Sustainability ISSN 2997-6286

== Chemistry & Industry ==
Since 1923, SCI also publishes the internationally-circulated magazine Chemistry & Industry (C&I). This has documented the advancements in chemistry and related science and the inventions being developed by large companies and start ups. It covers a diverse set of technologies and application areas.

== Awards and honours ==
The society has an extensive awards and honours programme.

The Honours programme was established in 1996 and is designed to raise awareness of the benefits of the practical application of chemistry and related sciences across scientific disciplines and industrial sectors and to celebrate accomplished scientists, inventors and entrepreneurs through a number of international awards, medals, and lectureships.

The most prestigious honours are the Society Medals, of which there are around 12, and these recognise those who exhibit leadership in promoting the objectives and values of the society. The Society Medals are awarded to persons who have made significant contributions in the field of chemical sciences, innovation and entrepreneurship.
