= Westminster College of Chemistry and Pharmacy =

British private college (1874–1943)

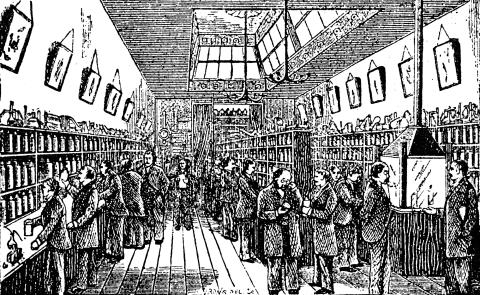
Westminster College of Chemistry and Pharmacy circa 1880

The Westminster College of Chemistry and Pharmacy was a private college founded in October 1874, for the teaching of chemistry and pharmacy, by the chemist and pharmacist George S. V. Wills. Its purpose was to prepare students for examinations set by the Pharmaceutical Society of Great Britain, founded in 1841. Westminster College flourished in the late nineteenth century but faced growing competition from public institutions in the 1920s and 1930s, and it closed around 1942.

== History ==
=== Victorian Origins ===
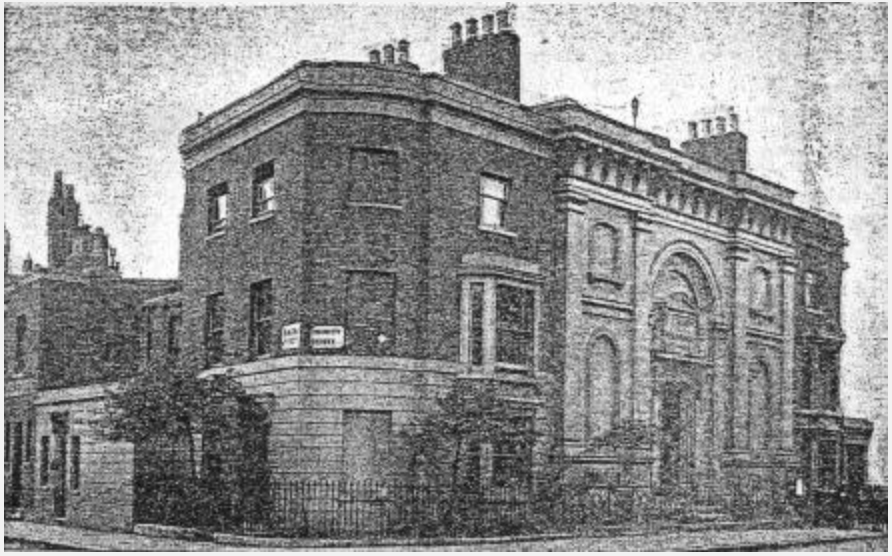
Westminster College of Chemistry and Pharmacy, Trinity Street, Southwark. From the Prospectus and syllabus of the Westminster College of Chemistry and Pharmacy, London, 1901.

The Westminster College of Chemistry and Pharmacy was a private college founded in October 1874 by the chemist and pharmacist George S. V. Wills. Its purpose was to prepare students for examinations set by the Pharmaceutical Society of Great Britain, founded in 1841.

By 1877, three years after its foundation, Westminster College was able to make the claim that it was the largest school of its kind in London. In addition, its students had achieved almost as many examination passes as all the other schools in England combined.

=== Expansion and growth ===
In 1882, as his student body expanded, Wills moved Westminster College into new premises, a defunct Baptist chapel in Trinity Street, Southwark.

In 1908, Wills suffered a financial setback following the failure of his pharmacy business, resulting in the loss of Wills's house and his personal assets. This financial failure caused the voluntary liquidation of Westminster College, despite it being registered as a limited company in 1901. However, the College was moved to a new location in Clapham, where it resumed its activities

In 1899 Wills self-published a memoir titled The Works of George S. V. Wills and The Westminster College of Chemistry and Pharmacy.

In December 1916 Westminster College moved again, from 402 to 190 Clapham Road.

=== Decline and closure ===
During the 1920s and 1930s growing competition from public institutions began to put pressure on private schools such as Westminster College, and their number began to decline. Westminster College was one of the last survivors, and it continued to advertise its courses into the 1930s. Its founder, George S V Wills, died on 28 April 1932, aged 84. In 1939, at the outbreak of war, the threat of air attacks led the College to discontinue day classes in favour of correspondence courses. The College address at 190 Clapham Road ceased to exist in 1942, most likely the year of its closure.
