= United Alkali Company =

United Alkali Company Ltd
- Company type: Ltd
- Industry: Bulk chemicals
- Predecessor: 48 separate companies
- Founded: 1890
- Defunct: 1926
- Fate: Merger
- Successor: Imperial Chemical Industries
- Headquarters: Widnes
- Products: Soda ash

United Alkali Company Limited was a British chemical company formed in 1890, employing the Leblanc process to produce soda ash for the glass, textile, soap, and paper industries. It became one of the top four British chemical companies merged in 1926 with Brunner Mond, Nobel Explosives and British Dyestuffs Corporation to form Imperial Chemical Industries.

== History ==
United Alkali was formed on 1 November 1890 when 48 chemical companies from the Tyne, Scotland, Ireland and Lancashire were merged. These included Newcastle Chemical Works, Allhusen, Gateshead; Atlas Chemical of Widnes; Henry Baxter of St Helens; Gaskell, Deacon of Widnes; Globe Alkali of St Helens; Golding-Davis of Widnes; Irvine Chemical of Scotland; A G Kurtz of St Helens; James Muspratt of Widnes and Liverpool; Runcorn Soap and Alkali; Charles Tennant of St Rollox, Glasgow; Wigg Brothers and Steele of Runcorn. The merged companies were:

1. Henry Baxter of St Helens
2. Globe Alkali Co of St Helens
3. Greenbank Alkali Works Co of St Helens
4. A. G. Kurtz and Co of St Helens
5. James McBryde and Co of St Helens
6. William Chadwick and Sons t/a St Helens Chemical Co of St Helens
7. Sutton Lodge Chemical Co of St Helens
8. Thomas Walker of St Helens
9. Gaskell, Deacon and Co of Widnes
10. Golding Davis and Co of Widnes
11. Robert Shaw t/a Hall Brothers and Shaw of Widnes
12. Hay Gordon and Co of Widnes
13. John Hutchinson and Co of Widnes
14. Liver Alkali Works of Widnes
15. Niel Mathieson and Co of Widnes
16. Mort, Liddell and Co of Widnes
17. Muspratt Bros. and Huntley of Flint
18. James Muspratt and Sons of Widnes and Liverpool
19. W. Pilkington and Son of Widnes
20. The Runcorn Soap and Alkali Works of Runcorn and Weston
21. Thomas Snape of Widnes
22. Sullivan and Co of Widnes
23. The Widnes Alkali Co of Widnes
24. Wigg Brothers and Steele of Widnes
25. The Netham Chemical Co of Bristol
26. Hazlehurst and Sons of Runcorn
27. Heworth Alkali Co of Heworth-on-Tyne
28. Jarrow Chemical Co of Jarrow-on-Tyne
29. Newcastle Chemical Works of Gateshead
30. J. G. and W. H. Richardson of Jarrow-on-Tyne
31. Seaham Chemical Works of Seaham Harbour
32. St Bede Chemical Co of Jarrow-on-Tyne
33. Charles Tennant and Partners of Hebburn-on-Tyne
34. Wallsend Chemical Co of Wallsend-on-Tyne
35. Eglinton Chemical Co of Irvine
36. Irvine Chemical Co of Irvine
37. North British Chemical Co of Dalmuir
38. Charles Tennant and Co of St Rollox, Glasgow
39. Boyd, Son and Co of Dublin
40. Newcastle Chemical Works of Port Clarence
41. Charles Tennant and Partners of Port Clarence
42. Fleetwood Salt Co of Fleetwood
43. E. Bramwell and Son of St Helens
44. Morgan Mooney of Dublin
45. Dublin and Wicklow Manure Co of Dublin
46. Peter Alfred Mawdsley of Flint
47. Tyneside Chemical Co of Newcastle-upon-Tyne
48. J.C. Gamble & Sons Ltd of St. Helens

Following the merger of the companies, some concerns were raised about the impact on employment. In Robert Sherard's The White Slaves of England (1896) he quotes of the impact in Runcorn, where the Alkali factory previously employed about 500 men but fewer than ten after amalgamation.

== See also ==
- Tharsis Sulphur and Copper Company Limited

== Bibliography ==
- Fenton, Roy S. Mersey Rovers. World Ship Society, 1997. ISBN 978-0905617848
