= Chemical industry in the United Kingdom =

The chemical industry in the United Kingdom is one of the UK's main manufacturing industries. At one time, the UK's chemical industry was a world leader. The industry has also been environmentally damaging, and includes radioactive nuclear industries.

== History ==
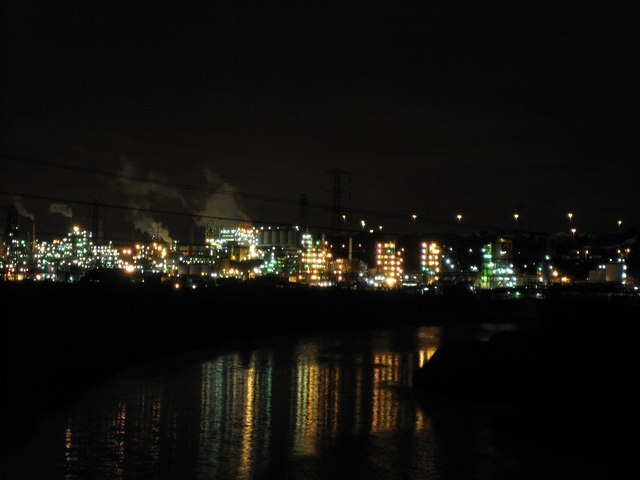
Weston Point chemical works, off the M56, near Runcorn and the River Weaver and the Weaver Viaduct

Alexander Parkes in 1855 develops the first plastic, in Birmingham, a form of celluloid. Daniel Spill, his assistant, develops it further, as xylonite. The American John Wesley Hyatt later tries to claim the patent, after developing another process for celluloid, with camphor, in 1869. The subsequent British Xylonite Company, formed in 1877, later becomes BX Plastics. A division, Cascelloid, formed in Leicestershire in 1919, becomes Palitoy. Another division, Halex, made sports products.

Sir William Henry Perkin FRS discovered the first synthetic dye mauveine in 1856, produced from aniline, having tried to synthesise quinine at his home on Cable Street in east London. Perkin's work, alone, led the way to the British chemical industry.

Before World War I, the country was largely dependent on Germany for fine chemicals.

Sir Harry Melville (chemist) at the University of Birmingham, conducted much important polymer research, with Birmingham becoming a world leader in polymer research.

Soap industry in Widnes

21% of the UK's chemical industry is in North West England, notably around Runcorn and Widnes. The chemical industry is 6.8% of UK manufacturing; around 85% of the UK chemical industry is in England.

It employs 500,000, including 350,000 indirectly.

It accounts for around 20% of the UK's research and development.

=== Timeline ===
- 1866 British Oxygen Company is formed by two French brothers, with the barium oxide Brin process discovered by Jean-Baptiste Boussingault of France; although the main subsequent company began in 1906; it was later a world leader in industrial gases
- 1905 Courtaulds is formed
- 1907 Royal Dutch Shell is formed, from two companies; the British part was founded in 1897 by Marcus Samuel, 1st Viscount Bearsted, which sold paraffin oil in the Far East; in order to counter competition from Esso, a joint company had been formed in 1903 with Henri Deterding of the Netherlands
- 1918 Nobel Industries was formed, containing all the explosives industry in the UK, by Sir Harry McGowan, the head of British Nobel
- 1926 ICI was formed from four large companies on 7 December, with a capital value of £65m; it was formed in response to competition from DuPont and Allied Chemical and Dye, which was formed in 1920, in the US; the chairman of Midland Bank, Reginald McKenna, in early 1926 had approached Sir Harry McGowan, from Glasgow, to take over British Dyestuffs
- 1929 Sir D'Arcy Cooper and Antonius Johannes Jurgens formed Unilever; these two companies had previously been staunch competitors across the world
- 1932 The Import Duties Act 1932 limited imports by tariffs. In the 1930s the chemical industry had many trade protections, limiting outside competition
- 1936 ICI formed a Medicinal Chemicals Division, as part of the Dyestuffs research division; this is now AstraZeneca
- 1939 ICI started its first polyethylene unit at Wallerscote in Cheshire. Fisons was also formed
- 1941 Tube Alloys began under Sir Wallace Akers of ICI
- 1947 British Hydrocarbon Chemicals was formed by Distillers (DCL) and BP at Grangemouth; it would have the feedstock from petroleum, not fermentation. In 1949 6% of British organic chemicals originated from petroleum; by 1965 it was 70%
- 1948 Laporte Chemicals, a leader in peroxide chemicals, was formed; it made hydrogen peroxide at Luton
- 1958 Synthetic rubber production in the UK is first started; International Synthetic Rubber at Grangemouth, which made styrene-butadiene elastomer, and DuPont made its neoprene synthetic rubber in Northern Ireland, at the same time
- 1963 Esso introduced butyl rubber (synthetic) at Fawley in 1963; it would make 20,000 tons per year and 35,000 tons by 1968, mainly for inner tubes; styrene monomer was made from late 1966, 50,000 tons a year
- 1967 BP Chemicals is formed, when BP bought the Distillers share; it became the second-largest UK chemicals company after ICI
- 1968 ICI is the world's second-largest chemical company, with Du Pont first. But the subsequent-largest of the UK, BP Chemicals, was 60th in the world. Germany was next, with Hoechst. But Shell was the world's largest petroleum company in 1968, followed by Esso.
- 1969 Ethylene propylene rubber is sold by Esso, but not manufactured
- 1981 Enoxy is formed, by ENI of Italy, which bought International Synthetic Rubber, which later became EniChem Elastomers
- 1986 ICI became the world's leading paint producer, making 750m litres, after it bought Valentine of France and Glidden from SCM of the US; Courtaulds had International Paints, mostly for ships
- 2001 Laporte was bought by Degussa-Huls of Germany for £1.36bn

=== Discoveries ===
- 1844 John Mercer (scientist) discovered the mercerisation process for textiles
- 1874 Otto Witt, a Swiss chemist in Brentford, made the first commercial azo dye, which he called Chrysoidine. Sir James Morton (chemist), in Carlisle, in the late 1890s developed some of the first dyes that were resistant to sunlight.
- 1891 Cordite was invented by Frederick Abel and James Dewar
- 1891 Charles Frederick Cross, Edward John Bevan and Clayton Beadle developed Viscose, the first manufacture of a synthetic fiber. Beadle's son, Sir Gerald Beadle (1899-1976), helped set up BBC Television in 1936, being the first Director of Television
- 1916 The important Acetone–butanol–ethanol fermentation process was developed to make cordite in World War I, from the fermentation of starch
- 1923 The first disperse dyes, an azo dye, was developed at the British Dyestuffs Corporation in north Manchester, and anthraquinone dyes. Arthur George Green FRS was an important colour chemist.
- 1928, iron phthalocyanine was discovered by Scottish Dyes at Grangemouth, when investigating phthalimide. Its chemical structure was found in 1934 by Sir Patrick Linstead. These are important dyes. It was the first new chromophore for 25 years. It led to copper phthalocyanine, known as British Rail Blue
- 1931 Perspex is discovered by ICI Dyestuffs division
- 1932 chemist John William Croom Crawford (1891-1987) at Ardeer, North Ayrshire, of ICI, developed a process to make methyl methacrylate, known as Perspex

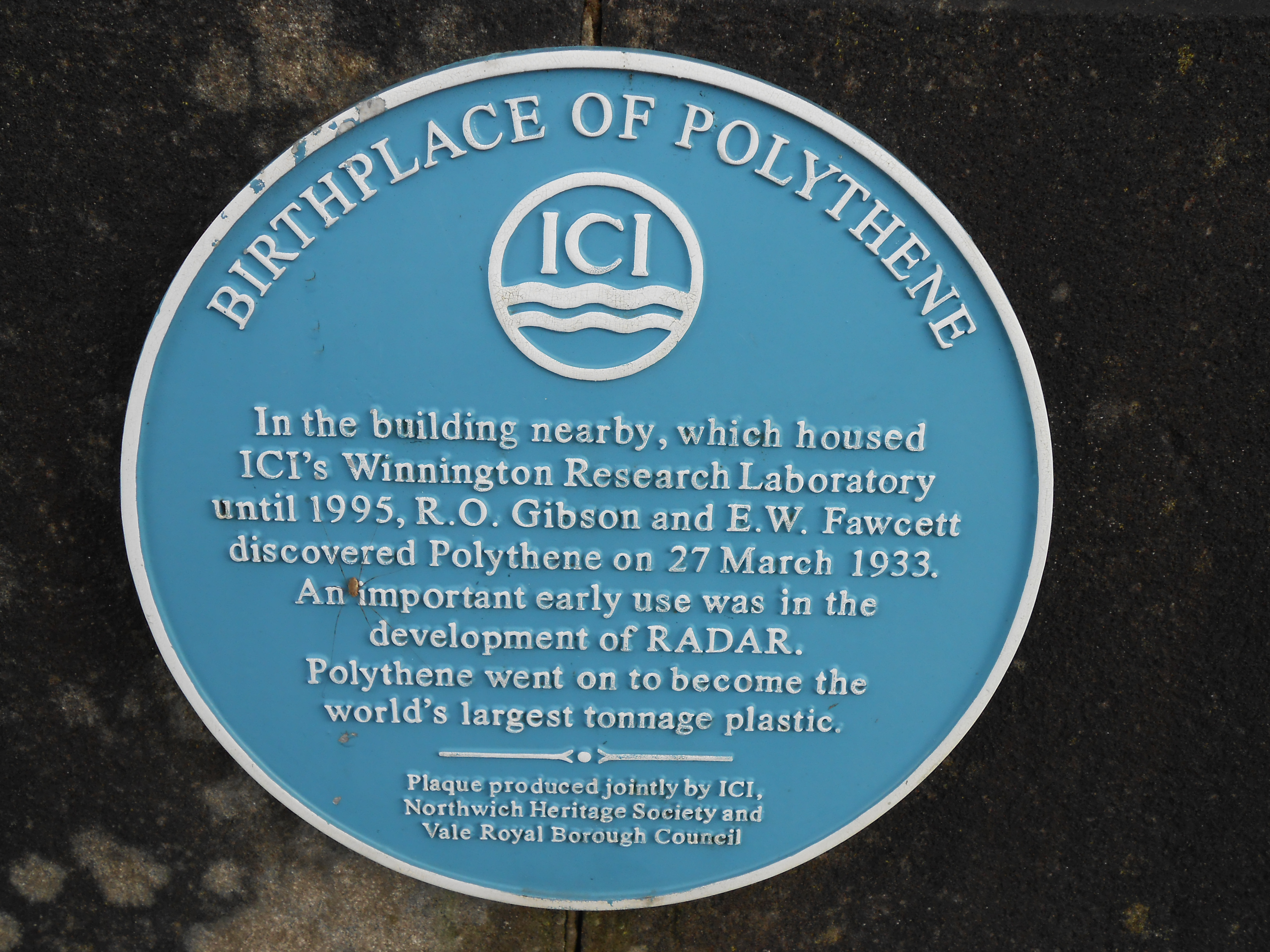
Plaque at Winnington

- 1933 Polythene is discovered at the Winnington Laboratory
- 1935 although Polythene was first discovered in 1933, only by 1935 did Michael Perrin of ICI discover that the oxygen percentage was an important catalyst. ICI scientist B Hapgood discovered that it was an excellent insulator, so was produced for undersea cables from 1939. In 1937 a group of German chemists visited ICI at Winnington, and wanted to licence the polythene chemical process, but no agreement was made. Du Pont, of the US, licensed the ICI process, and made it in bulk from 1941. ICI first made polythene in 1939 at Wallerscote
- 1940 John Rex Whinfield and James Tennant Dickson discover polyethylene terephthalate (known as PET) at the Calico Printers' Association on Poland Street in Manchester
- 1940 Hungarian Nicholas Kurti, and Germans Francis Simon and Heinrich Gerhard Kuhn developed the gaseous diffusion diffusion method of separating uranium hexafluoride for producing enriched uranium, as part of the Tube Alloys project, in association with ICI. This initial work was transferred to the K-25 plant at Oak Ridge National Laboratory in Tennessee
- 1940s Alcian blue is discovered by ICI Dyestuffs
- 1950 Sorex of Halebank develop the production of the warfarin rodenticide, similar to dicoumarol. Karl Paul Link, at the University of Wisconsin–Madison, had identified the substance in the 1930s; it is one of a set of 4-Hydroxycoumarins, that operate as a Vitamin K antagonist that inhibit Vitamin K epoxide reductase; the trade name originates from the Wisconsin Alumni Research Foundation (WARF)
- 1951 Halothane is discovered at the Widnes Laboratory
- 1954, Chlorhexidine, a bis-diguanide substance that was discovered at ICI Blackley at Hexagon House, part of ICI Dyestuffs, in north Manchester, when researching biguanides, the compound Hibitane with a bisbiguanide functional group was found by Frank Rose (chemist) FRS. ICI Blackley had also had Alfred Spinks FRS from 1940; it is an important disinfectant, commonly found in Corsodyl mouthwash
- 1954 Ian Durham Rattee (1926-2015) and William Elliot Stephen discover dichlorotriazine at ICI Blackley, sold as the reactive dyes Procion M (dichlorotriazine) from March 1956, and Procion H (monochlorotriazine) from 1957
- 1961 Biaxially Oriented Polypropylene discovered by ICI
- 1963 Phineas Davies and Frederick Snowdon at ICI develop and patent a copper, zinc and chromium catalyst for a low-pressure methanol production process. In August 1965 the catalyst was changed by John Gallagher and John Kidd of ICI; the catalyst were later licensed by ICI Katalco, now owned by a Hertfordshire company
- 1977, Sorex, of Halebank in Cheshire, discovers brodifacoum, to overcome warfarin resistance in rodents, it received a Queen's Award for Technology in 1977, it later manufactured difenacoum as 'Neosorexa'

=== Second World War ===
The Castner-Kellner works at Runcorn, of the United Alkali Company (formed in 1890) had made chlorine gas for the First World War trenches. Subsequently ICI's Special Products Department was at Weston Point in Runcorn, under Holbrook Gaskell, who had managed this production of chlorine gas.

The Sutton Oak Chemical Defence Research Establishment in Merseyside was established in 1915, on the former Magnum Steelworks, where Foster Neville Woodward was head of research from 1937. Research was conducted on nerve agents, such as DFP. Poison gas production was at Rhydymwyn in Flintshire in north Wales. Porton Down has researched toxins since 1916. The Germans had researched nerve agents at Dyhernfurth, under Gerhard Schrader and Austrian Richard Kuhn. The Americans conducted experiments at Edgewood Arsenal, and the Canadians at Suffield Experimental Station. The V-series of nerve agents, such as VE, VG and VX, were discovered by Ranajit Ghosh (1909 - February 1992) and James Frederick Newman (1915 - 30 June 2004) at ICI in 1952. VG was discovered first, also known as Tetram. Swedish Lars-Erik Tammelin was also conducting work into this.

The Aberporth Rocket Projectile Establishment began in 1941; this is now ParcAberporth, the only site in the UK licensed to fly UAVs, run by Qinetiq.

=== Output ===
In 2015, the UK chemical industry exported £50bn of products.

Below the UK chemical industry, the UK automotive industry exports £35bn, and the UK aerospace industry exports £32bn.

=== Research ===
The industry employs about 30,000 in research and development. The industry invests £5bn in research. The UK automotive industry invests £2.7bn and the UK aerospace industry invests £2.1bn.

Centres of research include the National Formulation Centre at Sedgefield, the Advanced Propulsion Centre in Coventry, with the nearby UK Battery Industrialisation Centre, and the Centre for Process Innovation in the north east. Unilever Research & Development Port Sunlight Laboratory is in the north west. BP has the Sunbury Research Centre in south-west London.

In the 1950s there was research at Fulmer in Buckinghamshire. Du Pont had a elastomers research site at Hemel Hempstead in the late 1950s.

== Industries ==
=== Plastics ===
In 1968 the UK produced 1.2m tons of plastics, which was rising at 12% to 16% a year. and 350,000 tons of that was thrown away, which could be a million tons by 1980, representing 7% of all refuse. The Society of Chemical Industry hoped that the Keep Britain Tidy campaign would be effective.

== Regulation ==
Regulation of the UK chemical industry is largely under the European Chemicals Agency (ECHA) and the Registration, Evaluation, Authorisation and Restriction of Chemicals legislation (REACH).

== Chemical plants ==
Teesside and Cheshire are areas with an established chemical industry. Significant chemical plants in the UK include:

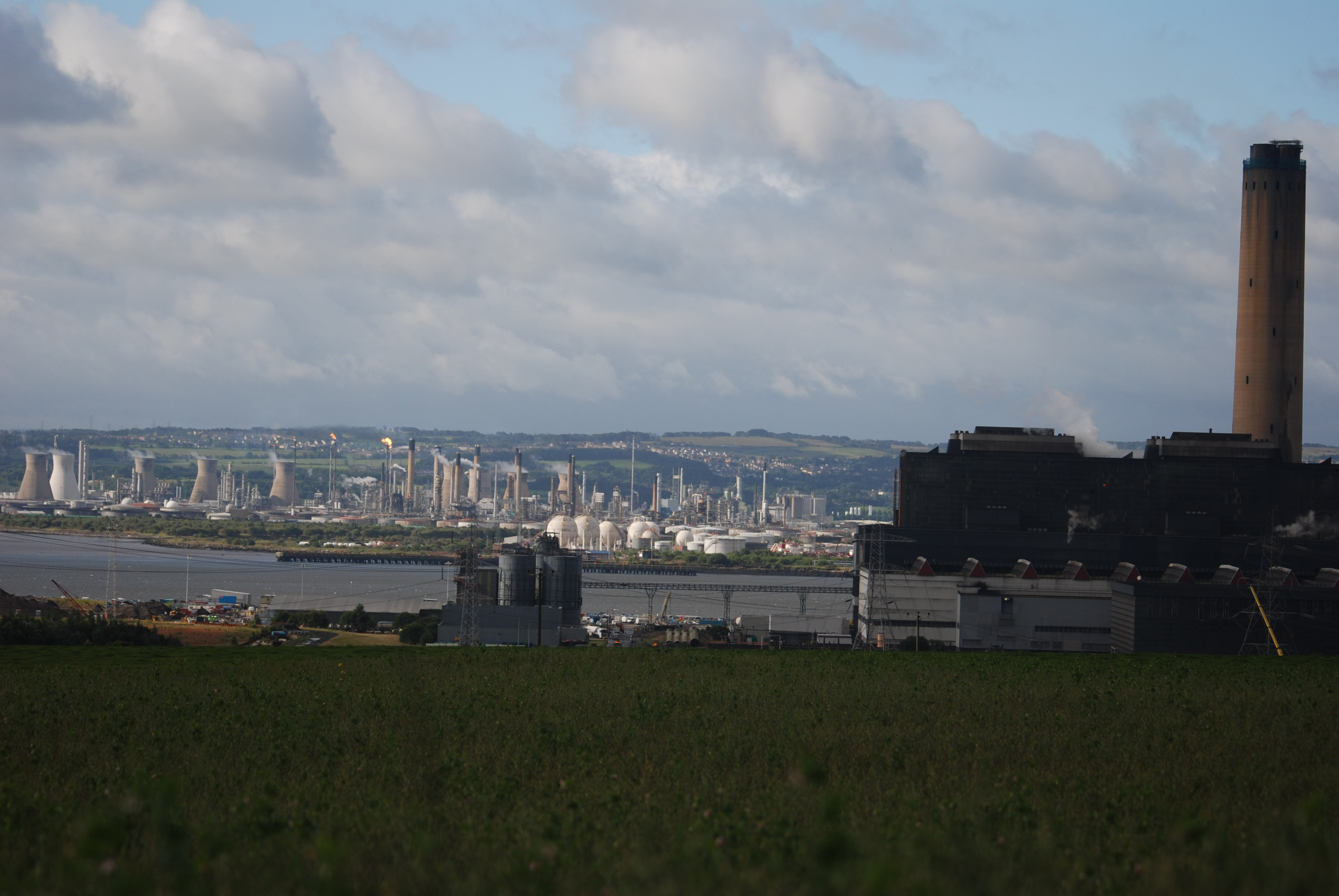
Ineos Grangemouth chemicals plant (former BP, now Ineos), seen in July 2007

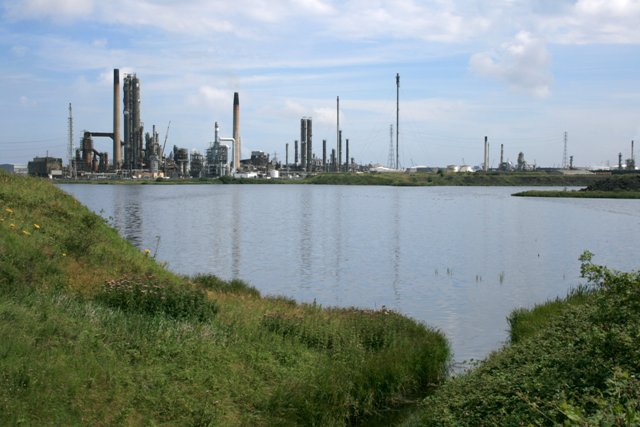
North Tees Works

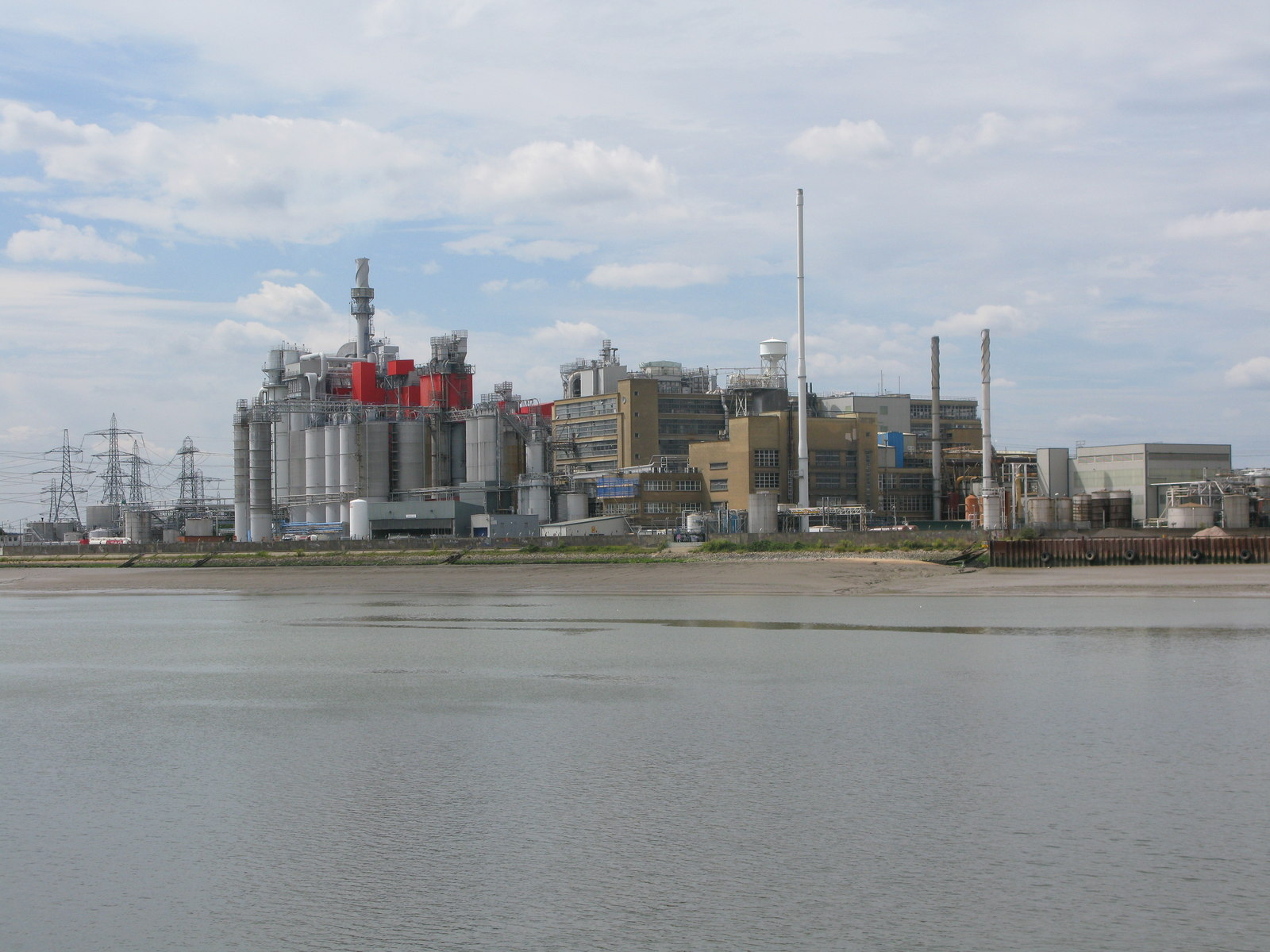
P&G's London Plant

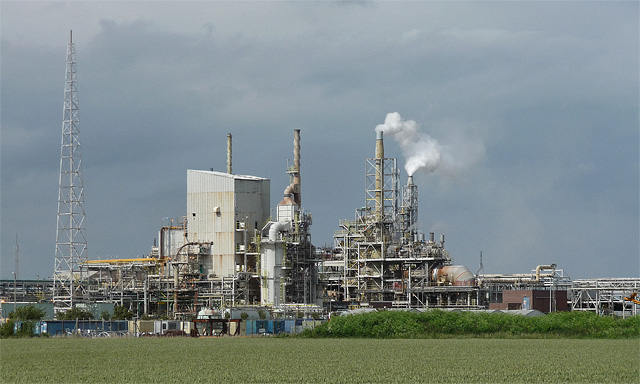
Stallingborough Plant

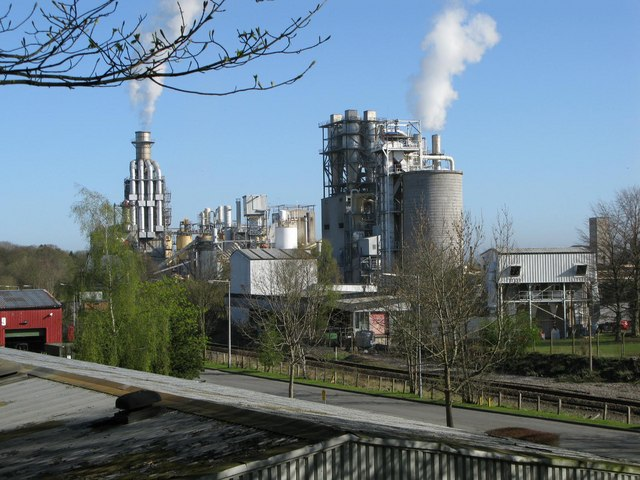
Kronospan at Chirk in April 2011

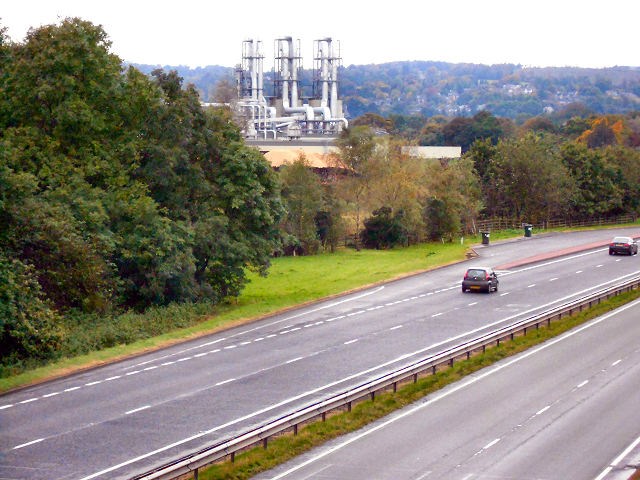
Hexham chipboard factory in October 2012, next to the A69

- Between Auchinleck and Ochiltree, East Ayrshire, off the A70, chipboard, owned by Egger (company)
- Billingham Manufacturing Plant, former ICI plant that makes nitrate fertiliser
- Chirk, north-east Wales, Kronospan factory
- William Blythe in Church, Lancashire near Accrington
- Clydach Refinery in Clydach, Swansea, Europe's largest nickel refinery, owned by Vale S.A.
- Cowie, Stirling , chipboard, owned by West Fraser Timber, first plant in the UK to make MDF, the previous owner Norbord was bought in 2021
- Fawley, Esso Chemicals, it cost £10m being 16 acres, it made 40,000 tons of ethylene and 42,000 tons of butadiene. Opened by the Ministry of Power Percy Mills, 1st Viscount Mills on December 5 1958
- Ineos Grangemouth chemicals plant, the propylene plant began in 1949, being opened at Grangemouth, Stirlingshire in May 1951 for British Petroleum Chemicals, which had been formed jointly between The Distillers Company and the Anglo-Iranian Oil Company (known as BP from 1954) in 1948. It would later have a crude oil feed from the Forties Oil Field
- Synthomer Harlow, Essex, formed as a joint venture of Hoechst and Revertex in 1964 to make thermo-plastic resins and poly vinyl alcohol as Harlow Chemicals
- International Paint in Heworth, near Gateshead, east of Felling, make paint for corrosive environments
- Hexham, Northumberland, owned by Egger, produces about 50% of the UK's chipboard
- Huddersfield Manufacturing Centre, former ICI plant from 1916, became Zeneca in 1993, then Syngenta, makes herbicides
- Maydown, Northern Ireland, the first Du Pont factory in Europe, when it opened in 1960, it was one of only three plants in the world that makes Kevlar, also makes Lycra
- Avon Products Northampton, Nunn Mills Road, cosmetics, visited by Prince Philip, Duke of Edinburgh in October 1990
- Petty, Highland, chipboard, West Fraser Timber
- Sika Redditch, former BASF Construction Chemicals
- Seal Sands, run by Lennig Chemicals, the site was built in 1972, later owned by Rohm & Haas, for making acrylate monomer
- South Shields, former Vidor batteries, after a management buyout in 1989, it became Hawker Eternacell in the 1990s, bought by Saft (company) of France in 2001
- Evode Chemical Works, Stafford, Common Road, formerly Glover Street until 1954, from the 1938, made Evostik, now makes Bostik
- Battery Works at Stallingborough in North East Lincolnshire, built by Taylor Woodrow Construction in 1950 for Laporte Industries
- Stallingborough Plant, owned by Tronox (Millennium Chemicals until 2007, then Cristal Pigment until 2019); it has been running since 1953 when owned by Laporte
- Brotherton Chemicals, Wakefield, established in 1878 by Edward Brotherton, 1st Baron Brotherton, bought by Esseco of Italy, from Church & Dwight of the US, in 2008
- P&G London Plant, at West Thurrock; it makes Ariel, Bold, Fairy and Daz
- BASF Widnes, Hale Road in Widnes, on the Saint Michaels Industrial Estate since 1978, makes rodenticides, former Sorex until 2009, opened in 1949, makes cholecalciferol (Vitamin D3) as 'Selontra', which causes hypercalcaemia in rodents, owned by Shell from 1981 until 1996
- Wilton International, built by ICI; it is 4000 acres and an olefine site
- Winnington Works, owned by Tata Chemicals Europe previously ICI, at Anderton with Marbury in Cheshire on the River Weaver; it was built in 1874, sold by ICI in 1991; it makes sodium bicarbonate
- A H Marks, Wyke, Bradford, since 1877, bought by Nufarm of Australia in 2008

== Former chemical plants ==
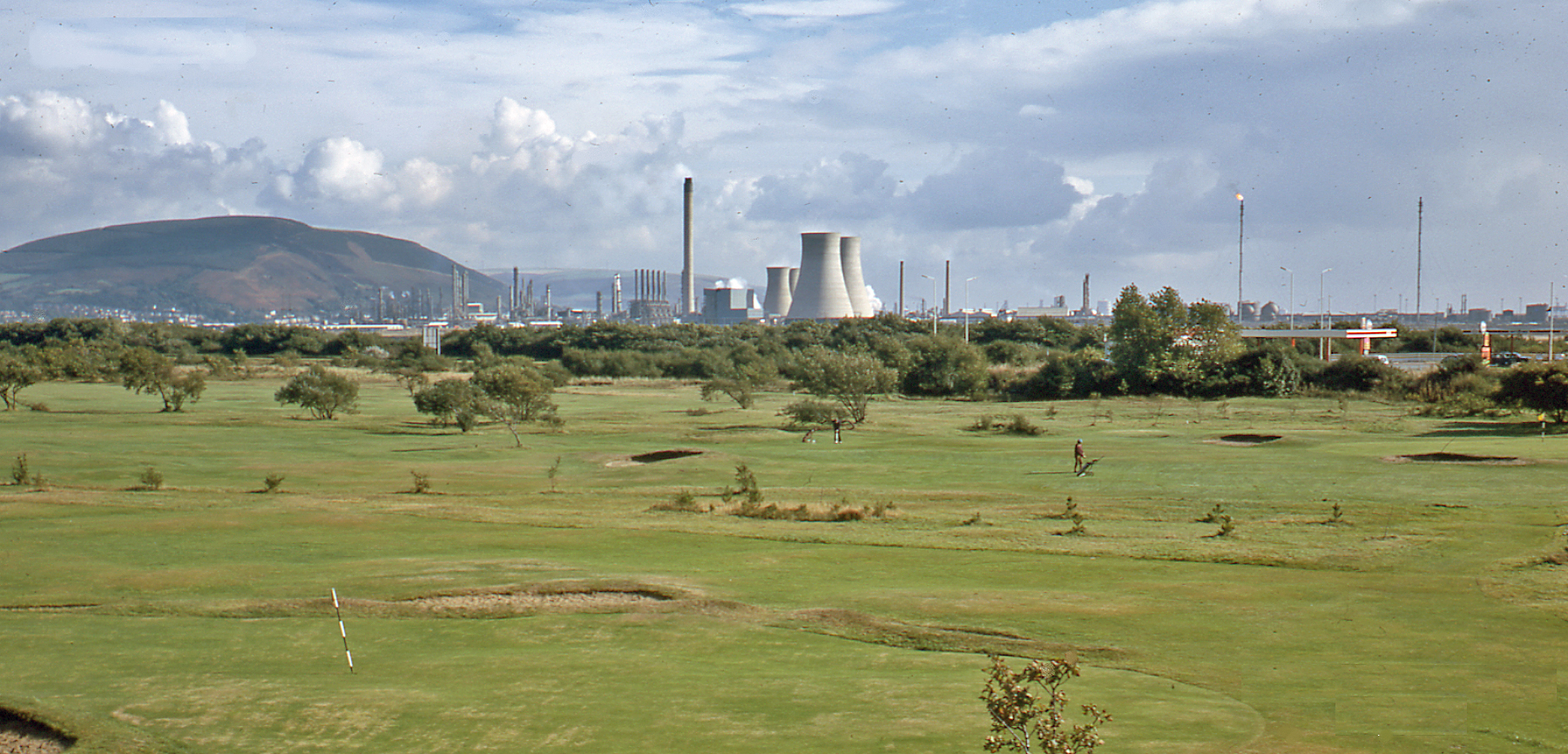
BP Baglan Bay Works, seen in September 1973

- Vale Europe Acton, London, Bashley Road, metals refinery, closed around 2019, the largest platinum metals refinery in the world
- Rio Tinto Zinc smelter at Avonmouth, the National Smelting Company, where the Imperial Smelting Process was developed in the 1950s, in the 1960s it was the largest zinc blast furnace in the world
- Baglan Bay Works, built similar to the Grangemouth plant for British Hydrocarbon Chemicals (from 1956) by George Wimpey, from 1961 between Port Talbot and Neath in south Wales, it had a light distillate feed from the nearby Llandarcy Oil Refinery, with a steam cracker., opened by Distillers from July 1963, it suffered fire in late February 1974; it made 40% of UK's styrene, 220,000 tonnes. British Hydrocarbon Chemicals became BP Chemicals in 1967. It was demolished in 2003.
- BASF and Chemdal International, Birkenhead, suffered an explosion on May 16 2001, consequently the site closed
- Hickson & Welch in Castleford; it suffered an explosion in 1992
- Four Ashes Chemical Plant, Schenectady Europe (SI Group, former Laporte before 1999) off the A449 in Four Ashes, Staffordshire; it was demolished in 2007
- Grimsby Works, built for Courtaulds
- Hardley, Hampshire, near Hythe, Hampshire, International Synthetic Rubber Ltd. Opened in October 1958, costing £6m, making 70,000 tons of SB rubber a year, with the butadiene supplied by the neighbouring Fawley plant, it made 'INTOL' synthetic rubber, it was built by Laing in 16 months
- Ward, Blenkinsop and Co, Halebank, Widnes from 1940, on the A562, closed around 2016, suffered an explosion at 9pm on April 6 1966
- William Blythe chemical Works at Hapton, Lancashire, next to the M65, in the Borough of Burnley
- Hauxton chemical works, 84 acres, in Cambridgeshire, owned by Fisons then Bayer Crop Sciences, closed in 2004
- BASF Coatings and Ink, Huyton, Ellis Ashton Street
- Lennig Chemicals opened its Tyneside Works at Jarrow in 1960, which was bought by Rohm and Haas in the 1970s, and bought by Dow Chemicals in 2009, and closed in 2015
- Portishead, a phosphorus plant which opened in 1951, the biggest in the UK, it stopped production in 1969, and production moved to Canada
- INEOS Nitriles (former BASF before 2008) at Seal Sands was formerly Europe's largest producer of acetonitrile; it was built by Monsanto in the early 1970s
- North Tees Works, former ICI near Seal Sands, east of Billingham in Stockton. Announced in June 1964, to make cyclohexane and aromatics. Made 400,000 tonnes a year, to be the biggest aromatics plant in Europe, opened 1966, built by Procon By 1970, would be the biggest aromatics plant in the world, when expanded south of the Tees, with a pipeline connecting the two sites. ICI jointly operated two neighbouring oil refineries. Shell had a refinery at Teesport
- Coalite Works at Shuttlewood in north Derbyshire, was placed on the proposed route of HS2, closed in 2004
- Stroud, Gloucestershire, BP Plastics, it made polystyrene
- Elementis chromium plant at Urlay Nook, near Eaglescliffe; it closed in June 2009
- BASF Coatings and Ink, Wednesfield, Well Lane, closed in 1997
- Howards Works was a chemical plant in Ilford. It was constructed in 1898 by Howards and Sons. It was operated by Howards and Sons until Laporte plc took over the plant in 1961. On 5 April 1975, an explosion took the life of Robert Church, an operator at the plant. The plant closed in 1980. Remediation was completed in 1990, and the site is now the Uphall Housing Estate.

=== Adhesives ===
- National Adhesives Braunston, west Northamptonshire, from the 1930s, suffered a fire on August 12 1986
- Forbo Chatteris, Cambridgeshire, industrial adhesives, former Swift Adhesives, bought in 2012 and closed
- Surridges Patents, Elmers End, Eden Park Avenue, in former north-west Kent, it made Titebond and Holdtite industrial adhesives

=== Household ===
- P&G Newcastle, former Thomas Hedley Co., bought in 1930
- P&G Seaton Delaval, south-east Northumberland, it made Head & Shoulders, a former Shulton site that made Old Spice, became Coty, closed in 2018
- P&G Trafford plant, made Head & Shoulders and Lenor fabric softener, former Thomas Hedley & Co, bought in 1930; the site has not closed, but currently produces non-chemicals
- Unilever Warrington made Persil and Surf; it closed on Thursday 15 October 2020, near Warrington Bank Quay railway station

=== Cosmetics ===
- Boots Contract Manufacturing, Airdrie, North Lanarkshire, made No.7 and Soltan
- Nicholas Laboratories, Littleborough, Greater Manchester, closed in 1991
- Constance Carroll, Skelmersdale, had a huge fire in November 1992
- P&G and Noxell Wakefield, Flanshaw Way Industrial Estate, cosmetics and perfume, closed in 2000, production moved to Nenagh in Ireland

=== Batteries ===
- Crawley, Sussex, Duracell had a long-life battery plant until 1992, with 350 staff. Duracell had been in the UK since 1961, with 1,200 British employees, under Duracell Europe; production moved to Aarschot in Belgium in 1992; the European Technical Centre remained at Lowfield Heath; Duracell left Crawley in early 1999, moving to Isleworth
- Dundee, Vidor, closed in 1983
- Newburn, Ever Ready, smaller batteries
- Aycliffe, former Vidor factory, bought by Rayovac of Wisconsin in December 1989, now called Spectrum Brands, production moved to Madison, Wisconsin in September 1998
- Tanfield, County Durham, the main Ever Ready factory, opened by the British Ever Ready Electrical Company in 1968; closed in 1996, the last UK Ever Ready plant

== Companies ==
Significant chemical companies in the UK have been:

- Fisons, a significant East of England fertiliser company, bought in 1995
- Ineos, it took over many production sites of ICI
- Unilever, with a main detergent site in Warrington and home care manufacture and research on the Wirral

== Organisations ==
Relevant organisations related to the UK chemical industry are the Institution of Chemical Engineers (IChemE), the Chemical Industries Association, and the Society of Chemical Industry. The chemical industry in Europe is represented by the European Chemical Industry Council or CEFIC.

== See also ==
- Energy in the United Kingdom
- List of largest chemical producers
- Pharmaceutical industry in the United Kingdom
