= 1856 in the United Kingdom =

Events from the year 1856 in the United Kingdom.

== Incumbents ==
- Monarch – Victoria
- Prime Minister – Henry John Temple, 3rd Viscount Palmerston (Whig)

== Events ==
- January – The song Glan Rhondda which will become the national anthem of Wales, Hen Wlad Fy Nhadau (Land of My Fathers), is composed by James James with lyrics by his father Evan James, both residents of Pontypridd.
- 29 January – Queen Victoria institutes the Victoria Cross.
- 4 February – The sailing ship Grand Duke is wrecked off St. Govan's Head in Pembrokeshire with the loss of 29 lives.
- 12 February – American clipper ships Driver and Ocean Queen leave Liverpool and London respectively, both to be lost without trace in the Atlantic, perhaps due to ice, killing 374 and 123 respectively.

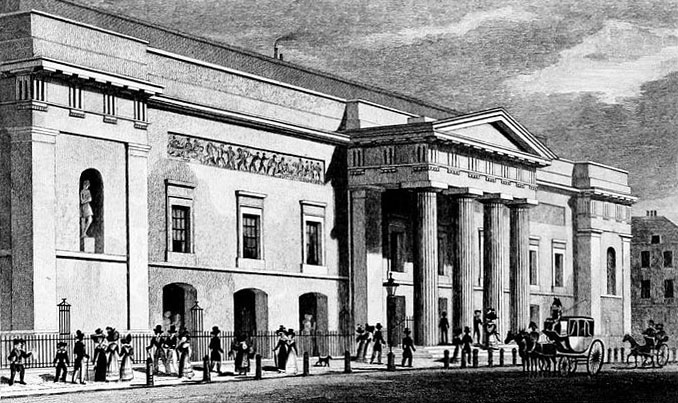
5 March: Covent Garden Theatre fire.

- 5 March – A fire destroys Covent Garden Theatre in London.
- 15 March – The Boat Race 1856, first of the annual series rowed between Cambridge and Oxford University Boat Clubs takes place on the River Thames in London, Cambridge wins.
- 31 March – The Treaty of Paris is signed, ending the Crimean War.
- 11 April – Trial of Offences Act provides for criminal trials to be transferred to the Central Criminal Court, the Old Bailey, in London if there is a risk that a fair trial at a local assize may be prejudiced. This is in response to the case of Dr William Palmer, the "Rugeley Poisoner", who on 27 May will be found guilty at the Old Bailey of murder.
- 19 April – The iron-hulled paddle steamer RMS Persia (launched on the Clyde, 1855) sets out from Liverpool on a 9-day, 16-hour transatlantic crossing at an average 13.11 knots (24.28 km/h) to regain the Blue Riband for the Cunard Line.
- July – Pauline, Lady Trevelyan, paints an image of the local wild poppies on a pilaster at her home of Wallington Hall, Northumberland; her most noted contribution to the Pre-Raphaelite masterpiece that is the central hall here.
- 9 July – Natal becomes a Crown Colony.
- 15 July – An underground explosion at the Cymmer Colliery in the Rhondda kills 114 men and boys.
- 29 July – Education Department Act creates the post of Vice President of the Committee of Council on Education.
- 3 September – The Royal British Bank collapses with debts in excess of £500,000.
- 22 September – Robert Mushet patents improvements to the Bessemer process for the production of steel.
- 8 October
  - The Second Opium War between several western powers, including the United Kingdom, and China begins with the Arrow Incident on the Pearl River.
  - Free Trade Hall inaugurated in Manchester.
- 1 November – Anglo-Persian War: War is declared between Britain and Persia in response to a Persian invasion of Afghanistan with the objective of capturing Herat.
- November – The first known rules of modern croquet are registered by Isaac Spratt in London.
- 1 December – Under the County and Borough Police Act, in any county or area where a police force has not already been established, the Justices of the Peace must from this date take steps to create one according to nationally defined standards.
- 2 December – National Portrait Gallery, London formally established.
- 9 December – Bushehr surrenders to the British.
- Undated – Edward Stanley Gibbons begins the sale of collectable postage stamps in his father's pharmacy in Plymouth, origin of the firm of Stanley Gibbons.

== Publications ==
- Mrs Craik's novel John Halifax, Gentleman.
- James Anthony Froude's History of England from the Fall of Wolsey to the Death of Elizabeth, begins publication.
- Charles Reade's novel It is Never too Late to Mend.
- W. H. Smith's pamphlet Was Lord Bacon the Author of Shakespeare's Plays?, the start of Baconian theory.

== Births ==
- 5 February – Frank Podmore, psychical researcher (died 1910)
- 14 February – Frank Harris, Irish-born author, editor and socialite (died 1931)
- 4 March
  - Julius Drewe, retailer (died 1931)
  - Alfred William Rich, watercolour painter and author (died 1921)
- 8 March – Bramwell Booth, Salvation Army General (died 1929)
- 12 April – William Martin Conway, art critic and mountaineer (died 1937)
- 15 April – Tom Mann, trade unionist (died 1941)
- 28 April – Bernhard Gillam, political cartoonist (died 1896)
- 22 June – H. Rider Haggard, adventure novelist (died 1925)
- 26 July – George Bernard Shaw, Irish-born playwright and critic, Nobel Prize laureate (died 1950)
- 8 August – Thomas Anstey Guthrie, comic novelist 'F. Anstey' (died 1934)
- 10 August – William Willett, promoter of daylight saving time (died 1915)
- 15 August – Keir Hardie, Scottish trade unionist and politician, founder of the Independent Labour Party (died 1915)
- 6 October – William Shea, actor (died 1918)
- 23 October – William Thomas Turner, Cunard ship's captain (died 1933)
- 14 November – J. M. Robertson, Liberal Party politician, writer and journalist, Parliamentary Secretary to the Board of Trade (died 1933)
- 1 December – Malcolm Smith, politician (died 1935)
- 11 December – Edward John Bevan, chemist, partner of Charles Frederick Cross (died 1921)
- 18 December – J. J. Thomson, physicist, Nobel Prize laureate (died 1940)
- 25 December – Samuel William Knaggs, civil servant in the West Indies (died 1924)

== Deaths ==
- 4 January – Charles Brudenell-Bruce, 1st Marquess of Ailesbury, politician (born 1773)
- 17 February – John Braham, operatic tenor (born c. 1774)
- 25 February – George Don, botanist (born 1797)
- 6 March – Thomas Attwood, economist and political reformer (born 1783)
- 14 June – William Palmer, "The Rugeley Poisoner", physician and probable serial murderer, hanged (born 1824)
- 14 July – Edward Vernon Utterson, lawyer, literary antiquary, collector and editor (born 1775/6)
- 6 August – Robert Lucas de Pearsall, composer (b. 1795)
- 14 August – William Buckland, geologist, palaeontologist and theologian (born 1784)
- 29 August – Mary Anne Schimmelpenninck, Christian writer (born 1778)
- 30 August
  - Gilbert Abbott à Beckett, comic writer (born 1811)
  - Sir John Ross, Arctic explorer (born 1777)
- 1 September – Sir Richard Westmacott, sculptor (born 1775)
- 19 October – Josceline Percy, admiral (born 1784)
- 1 November – John Urpeth Rastrick, railway engineer (born 1780)
- 21 November – James Meadows Rendel, civil engineer (born 1799)
- 23 November – Thomas Seddon, landscape painter, in Egypt (born 1821)
- 28 November – Frederick William Beechey, explorer (born 1796)
- 23/24 December – Hugh Miller, Scottish geologist, suicide (born 1802)
