= Finnart Oil Terminal =

Deep-water marine terminal on Loch Long

Coordinates: 56.115°N 4.832°W

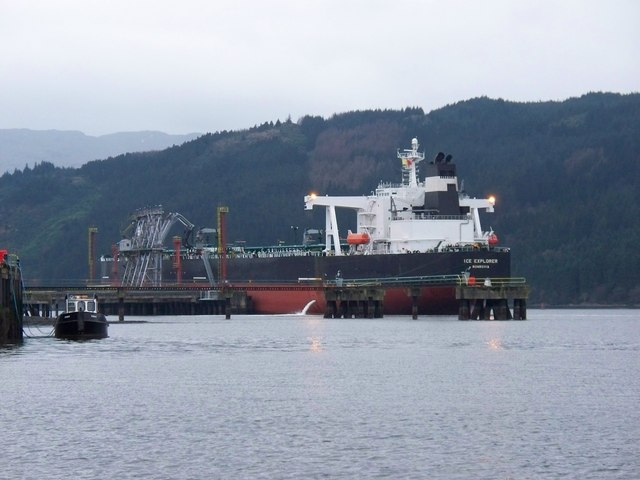
Ice Explorer at Finnart Terminal

Finnart Oil Terminal, also known as Finnart Ocean Terminal or Chap Point, is an oil depot on the eastern shore of Loch Long, Firth of Clyde on the west coast of Scotland, about 2 miles (3.2 km) north of Garelochhead on the A814 road to Arrochar. It has piers extending a short distance into the loch, providing a deep water berth for oil tankers up to 324,000 tonnes. Two pipelines connect the terminal across Scotland to the Grangemouth Refinery on the Firth of Forth on the east coast, and extensive oil storage tanks have been built into the hillside on both sides of the main road.

== History ==
The road from Gare Loch rises over high ground before descending steeply to Loch Long, and at the foot of the hill the last owner of the croft on the site built a stone into the roadside wall with the inscription "This road was made from the Castle Rosneath to Tenne Clauch in the year 1777 by his Grace John Duke of Argyll. Erected by John Fraser". The stone can still be seen in the wall, opposite the main jetty of the terminal.

The terminal takes its name from Finnart House, a country house to the east of the A814, constructed about 1832 for the Glasgow shipbuilder John Macgregor. It was designed by William Burn, who also designed Arddarroch House on the other side of the road, built in 1838 for the Glasgow merchant John McVicar. Both estates are now occupied by the oil depot.

Finnart House was the birthplace in 1855 of John Macgregor's son William York Macgregor, who became known as a landscape painter. The house subsequently became the home of the philosopher Edward Caird, who was Professor of Moral Philosophy at the University of Glasgow from 1866 to 1893. Around the 1930s the house was converted into a hotel. Arddarroch House went from the McVicar family to the Rutherglen industrialist John White (J & J White Chemicals) and his wife Amelia - later Lady Henry Lennox after she re-married following White's death in 1881. Her son Richard Brooman-White inherited the estate, and the family continued to live there for many years, including his grandson Richard Brooman-White who became a prominent politician.

== Oil terminal ==
When World War II began, a jetty was constructed at the site together with pumps and tanks to supply fuel oil to naval vessels, by the same team of engineers who had covertly built an American base known as Rosneath naval base on the Gare Loch before the United States entered the war. Finnart House was requisitioned to be used as an administration block for the United States Navy, and a personnel depot was constructed in the grounds of the house. Fuel was supplied by an oil pipeline from the Grangemouth Refinery via the Mountblow fuel depot near Old Kilpatrick, with a spur of the pipeline serving the Rosneath base. After the war, the grounds were cleared leaving only the jetty and a wooden pier, and the hotel resumed business.

The Finnart estate was then taken over by the Anglo-Iranian Oil Company, which later became the British Petroleum Company (BP). They built a direct 58 miles (93 km) long pipeline to deliver imported crude oil from the terminal to the Grangemouth refinery, and this was connected in 1954. A deep-water jetty was constructed to accommodate the larger supertankers then coming into use, and the terminal also took over the Arddarroch estate, with the whole site leased from the Ministry of Defence. A second pipeline was constructed to take finished products from the refinery to the terminal for export, primarily to Northern Ireland. The import of crude oil reached a peak in the 1970s, before North Sea oil began coming onshore in quantity. In 2005 the terminal was bought by the INEOS Group.

Arddarroch House has been converted into offices and accommodation, but the Buildings at Risk Register for Scotland records that at least since 1994 the B listed Finnart House has been boarded up and lies empty, at high risk. The register also has an entry for the B listed lodge at the roadside, also designed by Burn, which is disused and was at moderate risk as of October 2012. Both are shown as Crown property owned by the Ministry of Defence.

In September 2024, the owners Petroineos confirmed that the Grangemouth Refinery which connects to the terminal via two cross-country pipelines, would cease refining operations no later than June 2025. This will mean that the terminal and both cross-country pipelines will also close in the same timescale.

In July 2026 the terminal was purchased by the UK’s Ministry of Defence.
