= Chemical Industries Association =

Organization in the United Kingdom

- Abbreviation: CIA
- Legal status: Not-for-profit organisation
- Location: Kings Buildings, Smith Square, London, SW1P 3JJ
- Region served: United Kingdom
- Members: 140 companies
- Chief Executive: Stephen Elliott
- Main organ: CIA Council
- Affiliations: Cefic, International Council of Chemical Associations
- Website: CIA

The Chemical Industries Association (CIA) is the leading national trade association representing and advising chemical and pharmaceutical companies located across the United Kingdom.

Chemicals manufacturing in the UK is largely concentrated in the northern regions of the UK and Scotland, in four key chemical Clusters and are represented locally by well-organised Cluster Teams. In Scotland by Chemicals Team Scotland, Northwest England represented by Chemicals Northwest, Northeast England represented the Northeast of England Process Industry Cluster (NEPIC) and in Yorkshire and Humber by Yorkshire Chemical Focus and Humber Chemical Focus.

== Function ==
The CIA represents member companies at both national and international level. The CIA carries out advocacy on behalf of its members' interests. Its remit is to "articulate members’ collective hopes and concerns; improve appreciation of the situation amongst UK and European governments, the media and other key stakeholders; and help address the global competitive issues encountered by our members."

== Structure ==
The CIA currently has around 140 members. These members operate from around 200 sites within the UK. The Association is headed by an elected council of 25 industry executives. It is a requirement of membership that companies that committed to Responsible Care principles. Currently, the CIA is presided over by Tom Crotty, Director of INEOS.

The CIA owns and supports Chemicals Northwest.

== See also ==
- Association of the British Pharmaceutical Industry
- Chemical industry
- Northeast of England Process Industry Cluster
- UK Trade & Investment
