= Lavera Refinery =

Oil refinery complex located on the Mediterranean Sea, near Marseille, France

Lavéra Refinery
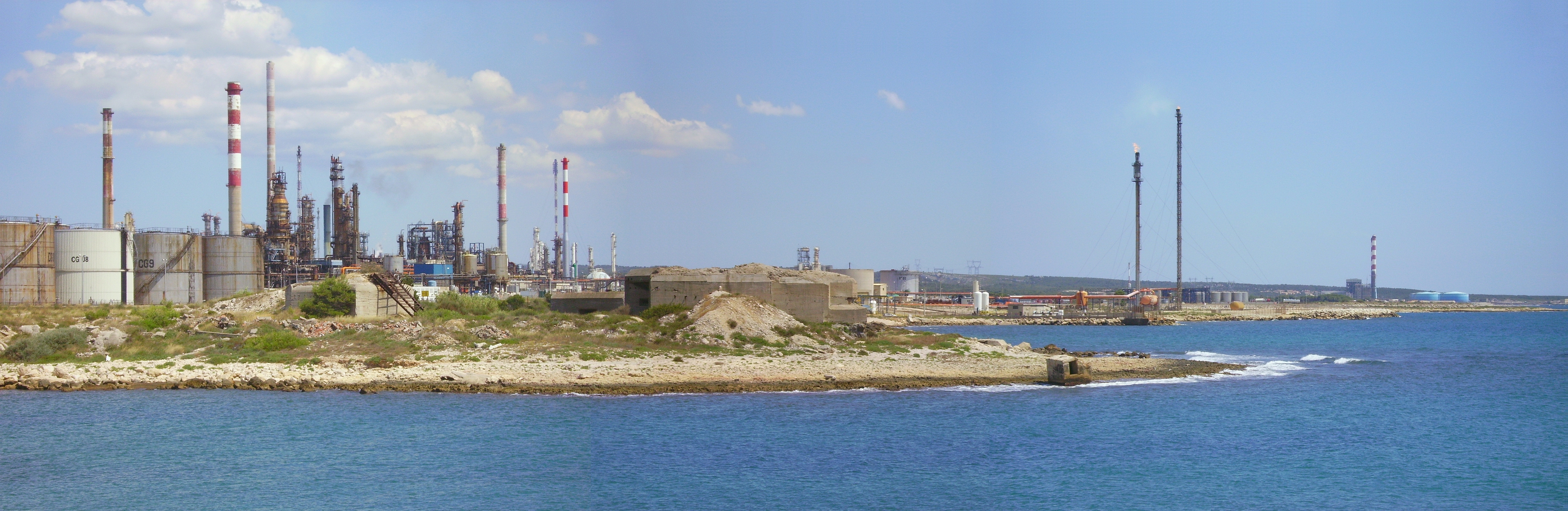
- The Lavéra PetroChemical Complex.

- Location of the Lavéra Refinery in France
- Location: Lavéra, hameau de Martigues, Provence-Alpes-Côte d'Azur, France; 43.388749°N 4.997363°E

Refinery details
- Operator: Petroineos
- Owners: Ineos; PetroChina
- Opened: 1933
- Area: 650 hectares (1,600 acres)
- Capacity: 210,000 barrels per day (33,000 m^{3}/d)
- No. of employees: 700

Lavéra Refinery is an oil refinery complex located 30 miles west of Marseille, France, on the Mediterranean Sea. It is currently operated by Petroineos.

== History ==
The Lavéra valley, known until the early 1950s locally as "L’Avéra", received its first oil installations during the 1920s, when the Société générale des Huiles de Pétrole (SGHP) selected the area to install storage tanks and an import terminal connected to the nearby railways using principally British capital.

The SGHP later built the Lavéra Refinery at the same location, inaugurated on 3 October 1933 to complement the Berre Refinery (built in 1931), with the La Mède Refinery then following in 1935.

Lavéra initially consisted of a storage tankage area located on the western side, with the eastern part containing the process units, and the offices and warehouses on the northern side. In 1954 SGHP became the Société Française des Pétroles British Petroleum (SFBP), owned by the British Petroleum Company, later known as BP.

After World War 2 the Marseille "Chambre de Commerce" decided to expand the facilities, opening a new port in 1952, which consisted of a pair of two-berth jetties to receive deep-sea vessels of 40 to 50,000 tonnes. A third jetty was added in 1958, and the three étang de Berre refineries were also connected by pipelines.

During the early 1950s a petrochemical plant was commissioned adjacent to the existing refinery, to use feedstock from refinery byproduct streams.

Initially sized to process up to 400,000 tonnes of crude annually, following the 1973 oil crisis Lavéra Refinery underwent significant expansion and doubled its footprint, to eventually process almost 10 million tonnes per annum of crude.

In 2004, BP decided to divest its worldwide olefins and derivatives business: the sale included the refinery and connected petrochemicals complex, and in 2005 the new company created to run this business was named Innovene, which later that year was purchased by Ineos, the largest privately owned chemicals company then based in the UK.

Ineos Refining, which included both the Lavéra and Grangemouth (on the Firth of Forth in Scotland) refineries, in 2011 entered into a 50/50% joint venture with the Chinese state oil company Petrochina, to form Petroineos.

== Operation ==
The annual capacity of the refinery is approximately 210,000 barrels per day, equating to around 10 million tonnes.

Finished products such as petrol, diesels, kerosene, jet fuel, fuel oils and bitumens are then exported by road, rail and ship.

Exports can also be made via the SPMR ("Société des Pipelines Méditerranée-Rhône", commissioned in 1968) Pipeline to depots in the Côte d'Azur, the Rhône valley, in the Alps and in Switzerland.
