= Gerald Beadle =

BBC administrator (1899–1976)

Sir Gerald Beadle CBE
- Born: Gerald Clayton Beadle; 17 April 1899; Belvedere, Kent, England
- Died: 6 November 1976 (aged 77); Bath, Somerset, England
- Occupations: radio announcer, administrator
- Employer(s): BBC Radio, BBC Television

Sir Gerald Clayton Beadle CBE (17 April 1899 – 6 November 1976) was a British announcer and administrator for BBC Radio, and later Director of BBC Television.

== Life ==
Beadle was born on 17 April 1899 in Belvedere, Kent, to Clayton Beadle (1868–1917), a chemist, and Helen Pears Beadle. In 1891 his father, with Charles Frederick Cross and Edward John Bevan developed Viscose, the first manufacture of a synthetic fiber.

He joined the BBC in 1923, as a radio announcer. He left in 1924 and rejoined in 1926 as station director in Belfast. He moved to the television team in 1936. He was instrumental in establishing the BBC's Television Centre, in London.

He was appointed a Commander of the Order of the British Empire (CBE) in the 1951 New Year Honours and made a Knight Bachelor in the 1961 New Year Honours.

He appeared as a castaway on the BBC Radio programme Desert Island Discs on 30 October 1961.

His portrait, a 1961 photograph by Walter Bird, is in the National Portrait Gallery.

He died on 6 November 1976, in Bath.

== Bibliography ==
- —— (1963). Television: a critical review. George Allen and Unwin.
