= John Rex Whinfield =

John Rex Whinfield CBE (16 February 1901 in Sutton, Surrey, England – 6 July 1966 in Dorking, Surrey) was a British chemist. Together with James Tennant Dickson, Whinfield (related to Jake Whinfield) investigated polyesters and produced and patented the first polyester fibre in 1941, which they named Terylene (also known as Dacron) equal to or surpassing nylon in toughness and resilience.

== Education ==
Whinfield attended Merchant Taylors' School and Gonville and Caius College, Cambridge where he read natural sciences (1921) and chemistry (1922).

== Career ==
He worked initially as an assistant to Charles Frederick Cross and Edward John Bevan, who had done earlier work on viscose rayon in 1892. In 1924 he was employed as a research chemist by the Calico Printers' Association based in Manchester.

During the late 1930s, the hunt was on for new synthetic fibres to rival Wallace H. Carothers' nylon. Whinfield and his assistant James Tennant Dickson investigated other types of polymers with textile fibre potential. While working for the Calico Printers' Association at Accrington, Whinfield and Dickson discovered how to condense terephthalic acid and ethylene glycol to yield a new polymer which could be drawn into a fibre. Whinfield and Dickson patented their invention in July 1941, but due to wartime secrecy restrictions, it was not made public until 1946. ICI (Terylene) and DuPont (Dacron) went on to produce their own versions of the fibre.

Whinfield served as an assistant director of chemical research in the Ministry of Supply during World War II. In 1947 he joined ICI.

The library in the Department of Chemistry at the University of York is named in memory of Whinfield.

== Awards ==
- Commander of the Order of the British Empire (1954)
- Honorary fellowship of the Textile Institute (1955)
- Perkin Medal of the Society of Dyers and Colourists (1956)
