= Grangemouth Refinery =

Oil refinery complex located on the Firth of Forth in Grangemouth, Scotland

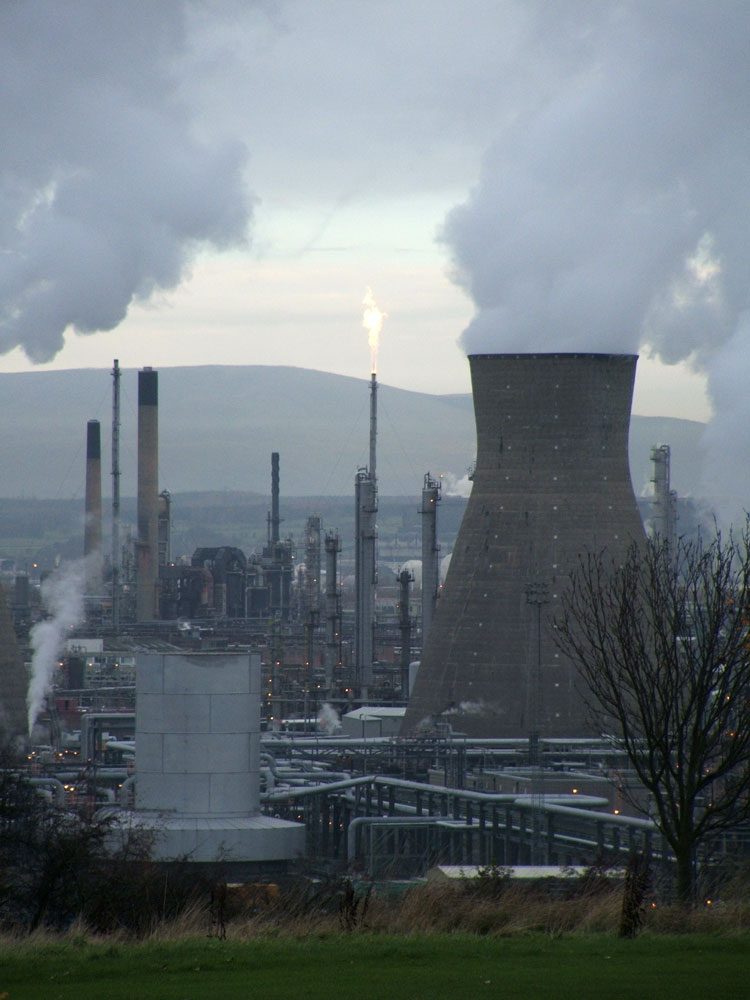
- Overview of the ethylene plant and one of the cooling towers

- Location of the Grangemouth Refinery in Scotland
- Location: Firth of Forth, Grangemouth, Scotland; 56.018°N 3.698°W

Refinery details
- Operator: Petroineos
- Owners: Ineos; PetroChina
- Opened: 1924
- Closed: 30th June 2025
- Area: 700 hectares (1,700 acres)
- Capacity: 140,000 barrels per day (22,000 m^{3}/d)
- No. of employees: 500 (2023)
- Refining units: 10
- No. of oil tanks: 200+

Grangemouth Refinery was an oil refinery complex located on the Firth of Forth in Grangemouth, Scotland, built by BP but latterly operated by Petroineos. It was the only operating crude oil refinery in Scotland, and with its closure left five remaining refineries in the UK. Grangemouth until that point was the oldest refinery in the UK and supplied 65% of Scotland's oil products, including petrol and diesel. The refinery processed its last crude in April 2025, and is slated to fully convert to a fuels terminal from July 2025 onwards.

== History ==
=== Choice of location ===
Grangemouth Refinery commenced operation in 1924 as Scottish Oils. Its location at Grangemouth was selected due to the adjacent Grangemouth Docks which supported the import by ship of Middle East crude oils for feedstock, plus the cheap availability of large areas of reclaimed flat land. Another important factor was the abundant availability of skilled labour in shale oil refining: the first oil works in the world, 'Young's Paraffin Light and Mineral Oil Company Limited', had opened in 1851 at Boghead near Bathgate, to produce oil from shale or coal using the process patented in 1850 by Glasgow scientist Dr James Young (known as "Paraffin" Young), for "treating bituminous coals to obtain paraffine therefrom".

With the world's first oil wells coming on-line in 1854 in Poland, the global price of oil dropped and many Scottish shale oil works became uneconomical and had to either close or concentrate production on other materials. By 1910 only five major Scottish shale oil companies remained, fighting to remain competitive against cheaper imported American oil.

During the First World War the British government helped to develop new fields in Arabia to provide cheap oil to sustain the war effort. This drove prices even lower to a point where the shale oil industry was unable to compete, and as a result in 1919 the six surviving companies (including Youngs) came together under the management of the newly formed Scottish Oils. That same year Scottish Oils was purchased by the Anglo-Persian Oil Company, a forerunner of the British Petroleum Company (later known as BP)

=== Simple refinery: 1924–1939 ===
The refinery operated from 1924 to 1939 at a throughput of 360,000 tonnes per year. It was then forced to shut down between 1939 and 1946 by World War II and the resulting drying up of crude feedstock imports. When operations recommenced in 1946, the refinery underwent several major expansion programmes.

=== Petrochemical complex: 1946–1975 ===
In the 1940s the Distiller's Company Ltd were investigating synthetic processes for the production of alcohol, to replace the traditional fermentation process using molasses and so resolve issues with unreliability of supply and the associated cost fluctuations. This business need combined with BP's interest in petrochemical development resulted in 1947 in the formation of a joint company, British Hydrocarbon Chemicals Ltd.

The new company located its site adjacent the existing BP Grangemouth Refinery, using available feedstock from the refinery byproduct streams. This petrochemical plant was commissioned in 1951, the first in Europe, marking the beginnings of the Ineos Grangemouth petrochemical complex.

In the 1950s the refinery was connected to the Finnart Oil Terminal on Loch Long on the west coast of Scotland by a 58-mile (93 km) pipeline, to allow the import of crudes via deep-water jetty, which supported the use of larger oil tankers. The first crude oil import from Finnart was in 1952.

In the 1990s, a second line was also installed, to allow the direct supply of finished refinery products to the Finnart terminal, primarily for export to markets in Ireland.

In the 1960s, a pilot "proteins-from-oil" production facility was built at the refinery. It used BP's technology for feeding n-paraffins to yeast, in order to produce single cell protein for poultry and cattle feed.

=== North Sea oil: 1975–2004 ===
In 1975 the discovery of North Sea oil brought the commissioning of the Kinneil Crude Oil Stabilisation Terminal, which connected directly into the Forties pipeline system; this plant served to stabilise Forties crude oil for either export to third parties or feeding into the refinery, and allowed the processing of North Sea oil as part of the refinery crude 'slate' of feedstocks.

=== Post-BP period: 2004–2023 ===
In 2004 BP decided to divest its worldwide olefins and derivatives business: the sale included the refinery and connected petrochemicals complex (excluding the Kinneil terminal and Forties Pipeline System, which BP retained until FPS was sold to Ineos in 2017).

In 2005 the new company created to run this business was named Innovene, which later that year was purchased by Ineos, the largest privately owned chemicals company based in the UK.

Ineos Refining, which included both the Grangemouth and Lavéra (outside Marseille, France) Refineries, in 2011 entered into a 50%/50% joint venture with the Chinese state oil company Petrochina, to form Petroineos.

In November 2020, Petroineos announced the mothballing of the oldest of the three Crude Oil Distillation Units, and its Fluid Catalytic Cracking Unit, both of which had been shut down since the start of the COVID-19 pandemic. This would also be accompanied by the loss of up to 200 jobs, or around 1/3 of the permanent workforce.

Petroineos blamed this restructuring on the reduction in demand for road and jet fuels, a direct result of the pandemic, combined with a gradual long-term increase in the electrification of road vehicles, and a decreased reliance on fossil fuels. This would reduce the total refinery throughput from 210,000 to 150,000 barrels per stream day.

=== Planned closure and transition to import terminal: 2023–2025 ===
In November 2023, Petroineos announced that it would cease manufacturing operations at the refinery by 2025 and convert Grangemouth into a terminal for the import, storage and distribution of a range of fuels including petrol, diesel and aviation fuel. The company said this was due to its forecast of "dramatically reduced demand for key fuels we produce" and the ongoing demand reduction for road fuel from the electrification of road vehicles. The closure of the refining plant would result in around 450 job losses with approximately 100 jobs retained post the transition.

In September 2024, Petroineos further confirmed that the closure would take place no later than June 2025. The new Grangemouth Terminal would employ around 75 personnel.

Beside the refinery, Finnart Oil Terminal on Loch Long as well as the two cross-country pipelines connecting the two will close, in the same timescale.

The transition would also result in the sale or closure of the Petroineos owned Dalston Oil Terminal in Cumbria, which is supplied from the Refinery Rail Loading Terminal, and then supplies transport fuels to local customers in the North-West of England. The final fuel shipment to the terminal was expected by the end of 2024.

At the end of April 2025, Petroineos confirmed that, in line with its plans, Grangemouth Refinery had ceased processing crude oil, thus bringing the oil refining industry in Scotland to an end; 200 redundant workers would be leaving the complex by end of June of that year, with the refinery due to close at the same time to commence operation as an oil terminal.

== Operation ==
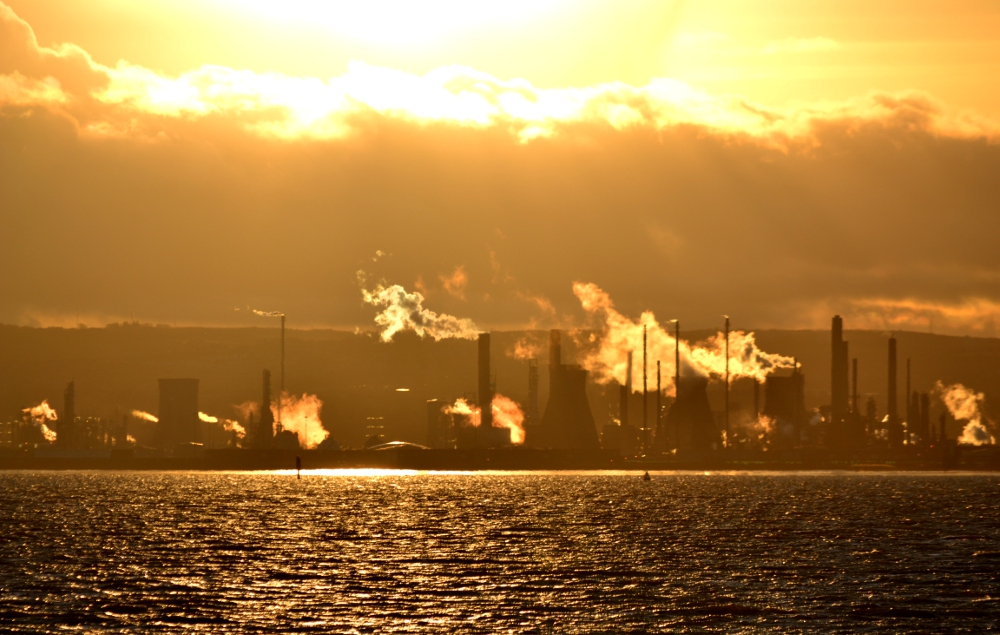
December 2011

The Grangemouth Refinery remains a major landmark, with its numerous gas flares and cooling towers visible across a wide area of the Scottish Lowlands.

Scenes from the 2013 film World War Z featuring Brad Pitt were filmed near the chemicals plant.

The refinery had a 'nameplate' capacity for processing 140,000 barrels (22,000 m^{3}) of crude oil daily. It used to employ about 500 permanent staff, and a further 350 contractors over a 700 hectare site.

It processed approximately 400,000 tonnes of imported crude oil annually until the end of the Second World War, and subsequent expansion programmes have increased refining capacity to in excess of 10 million tonnes per year.

The INEOS-owned North Sea Forties pipeline system terminates at the Kinneil processing facility, and surplus crude is exported via pipeline to the Dalmeny tank farm, and subsequently shipped out from the Hound Point marine terminal onto oil tankers of up to 350,000 DWT which are able to navigate the shallow water of the Forth.

== Annual output share ==
- Petrol - 22%
- Diesel - 24%
- Kerosene & Jet fuel - 13%
- Gas oil - 8%
- Fuel oil - 15%
- LPG/petrochemical feedstocks - 12%
- Fuel gas/other - 6%
- Waste - 1%

== Safety record ==
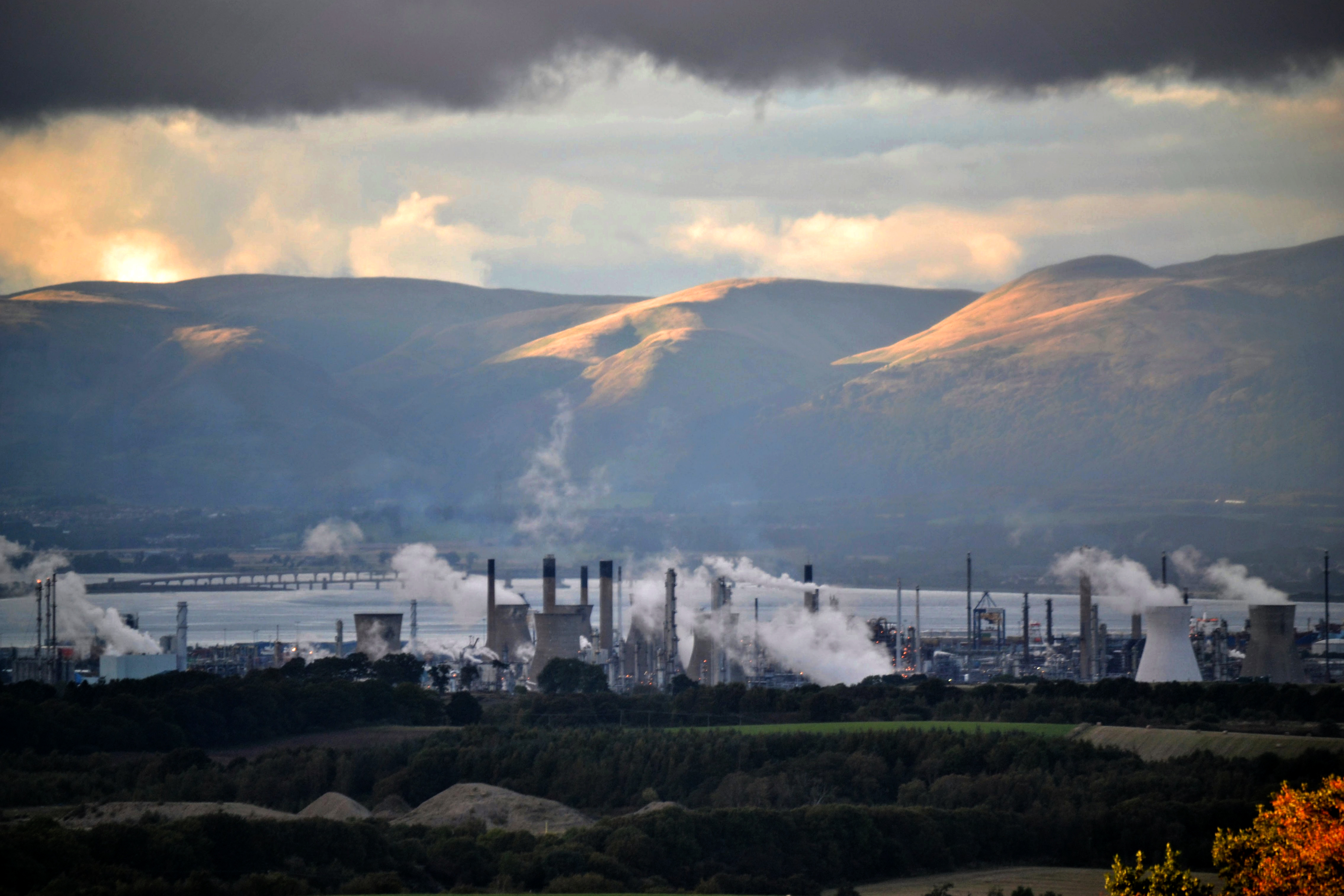
Refinery from the Bathgate Hills

One of the refinery's biggest accidents happened at 7 am on Sunday 22 March 1987 when the HydroCracker Unit exploded. The resulting vibrations and noise could be heard up to 30 km away. The resulting fire burned for most of the day. One worker was killed. Just 9 days earlier on 13 March, another incident occurred involving the refinery flare line, the resulting fireball killed two workers.

In 2002, BP the previous owners of the plant, were fined £1m for breaching safety laws during a series of incidents which occurred in 2000.

Ineos went to court in April 2008 over claims that it had polluted the River Forth in mid-2007.

== Ineos industrial disputes ==
In 2008, Ineos proposed that plant workers start contributing a share towards their own pensions (a final salary pension scheme), instead of the existing non-contributory fixed salary pensions. The request would have obliged future new entry employees to pay 6% of their salary, phased in over a six-year period. 97% of the Unite trade union's 1,250 members at Grangemouth voted in favour of strike action. David Watt, of the Institute of Directors in Scotland, stated that the average Grangemouth Refinery plant worker earns £40,000 per year (nearly twice the Scottish average.) This was disputed by the Deputy General Secretary of the Scottish Trades Union Congress, Dave Moxham, who stated that they earn £30,000 per year.

The strike began on 27 April 2008, and lasted until 29 April. The petrol supply of Scotland was affected by the strike, as panic buying led some petrol stations across the country to run dry. The Retail Motor Industry Federation stated that there was a stock of fuel that could last 70 days, easily covering the lapse in production so long as no panic buying occurred. With the shutdown of the plant, BP closed the Forties pipeline system as their Kinneil terminal relies on power from the Grangemouth refinery. With the shutdown of Kinneil, 70 North Sea oil platforms were forced to shut down or reduce production, at the cost of 700,000 barrels per day (110,000 m^{3}/d). Shutting the pipeline down reduced Britain's petroleum supply (the Forties pipeline provides 30% of the UK's North Sea oil), and cost the UK economy £50 million in lost production every day it remained closed.

There was further industrial action in 2013. Ineos stated that the plant was making losses, and offered a survival plan requiring employees to accept worse employment terms, particularly on pensions, which the employees rejected. Ineos stated in October 2013 that the petrochemical works would close. On 24 October the unions accepted a survival plan put forward from the management of the plant. On 25 October 2013, it was announced the plant will stay open and Unite had agreed to taking no strike action for three years, moving to a new pension scheme and accepting a three-year pay freeze.

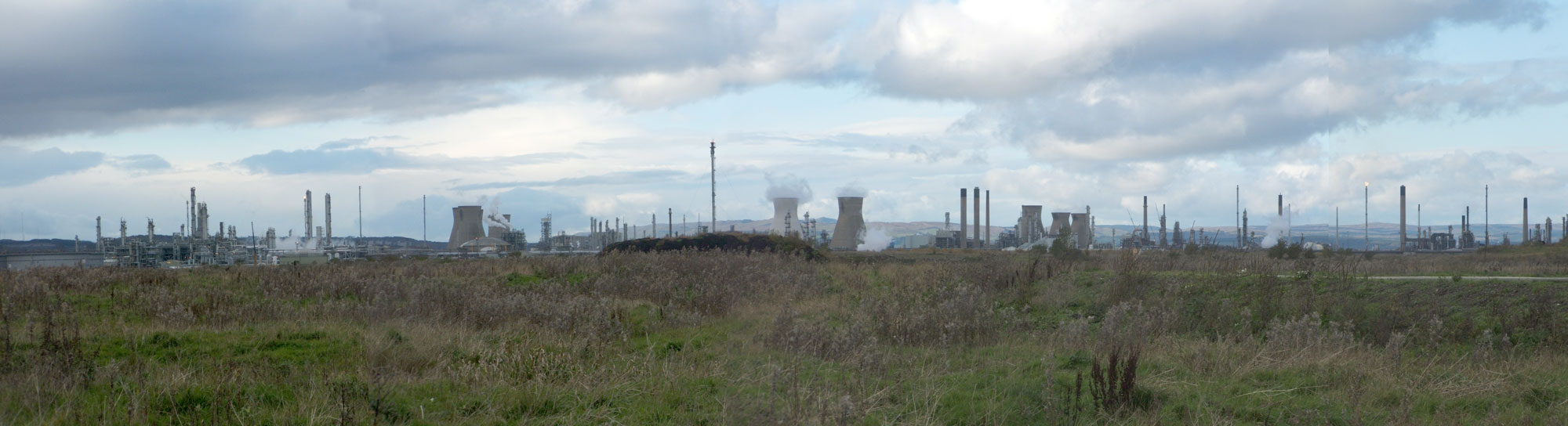
Panorama of Grangemouth petrochemical works, November 2006

== See also ==
- Esso Refinery, Milford Haven
