= Ineos Grangemouth =

Petrochemical complex in Grangemouth, Scotland

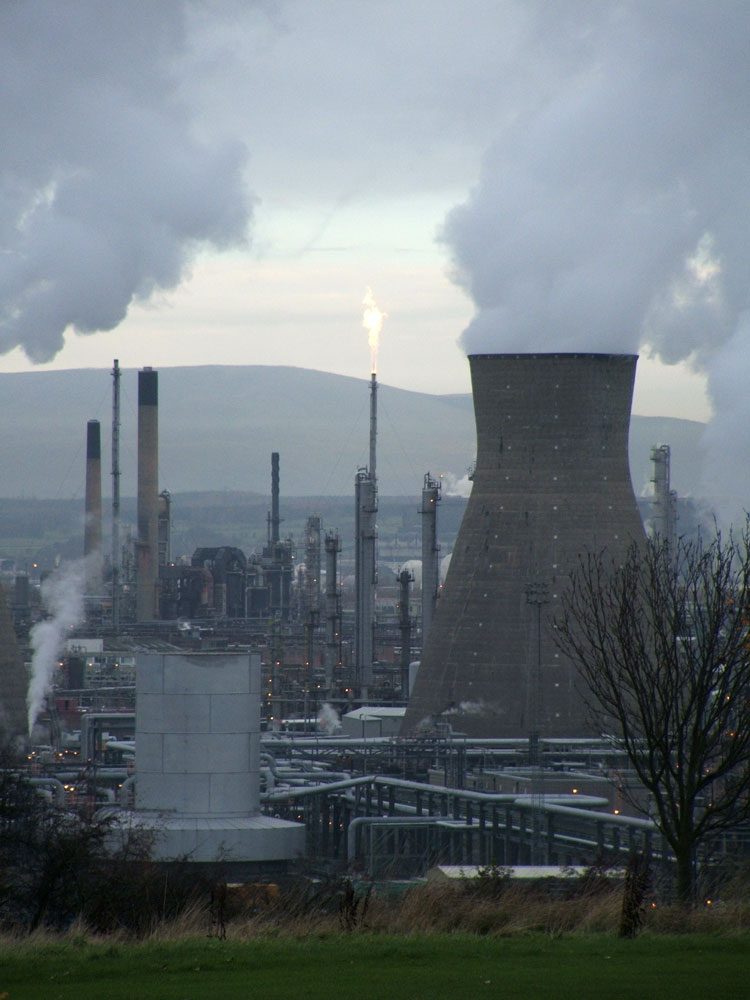
- Overview of the ethylene plant

- Location of Ineos Grangemouth in Scotland
- Built: 1951
- Location: Bo’ness Road; Grangemouth, Scotland
- Coordinates: 56.018°N 3.698°W
- Industry: Petrochemicals
- Products: Ethylene, Propylene, Polyethylene, Polypropylene
- Employees: 500 (2025)
- Area: 700 hectares (1,700 acres)
- Owner: Ineos
- Website: www.ineos.com

Ineos Grangemouth is a petrochemical complex located adjacent the closed Grangemouth Refinery on the Firth of Forth in Grangemouth, Scotland.

Built by BP but latterly operated by Ineos, it houses the last operating ethylene cracker in the United Kingdom. It forms one of Ineos's major manufacturing sites, producing approximately 1.4 million tonnes per annum of products.

== History ==
=== Location ===
In 1924 Scottish Oils commenced operations at Grangemouth Refinery, a location favoured by the adjacent Grangemouth Docks which supported the import by ship of crude oil feedstock, the cheap availability of large areas of reclaimed flat land, and the abundant availability of central belt labour skilled in shale oil refining. The company had itself been acquired in 1919 by the Anglo-Persian Oil Company.

=== Petrochemicals: 1951–1975 ===
The refinery, forced to temporarily shut down operations between 1939 and 1946 due to World War II, started up again in 1946 to growing worldwide demand for petrochemical products.

In the 1940s The Distiller's Company Ltd (DCL) were investigating synthetic processes for the production of alcohol, to replace the traditional fermentation process from molasses in order to resolve issues with unreliability of supply and associated cost fluctuations. This combined with BP's interest in petrochemical development, resulting in 1947 in the formation of a joint venture company, British Petroleum Chemicals, then later in 1956 renamed British Hydrocarbon Chemicals (BHC).

BHC located its site adjacent the existing BP Refinery, and Europe's first ethylene cracker was commissioned in 1951, using available liquid feedstock from the refinery and named G1 (standing for "Grangemouth 1"). A light petroleum distillate liquid stream was heated with steam to crack the longer paraffinic molecules into shorter olefinic molecules ethylene and propylene, building blocks of the petrochemical industry which could then be used to make longer polymer chains.

Other joint ventures were initiated due to the increased demand for polystyrene plastic, resulting in a styrene monomer plant commissioned 1953 for Forth Chemicals (50% owned by Monsanto).

In 1956 G2 was added as a second cracker. The site was over the succeeding years expanded to include its own fire station, power station to produce native steam & electricity, a research centre, and its own in-house analytical chemistry laboratories.

1956 also saw a butadiene unit opened, extracting this compound from cracker products, to then feed a nearby factory owned by the International Synthetic Rubber Company (later Enichem, then Polimeri Europa, now decommissioned) to make butyl rubbers. Another factory (since demolished) owned by the Bakelite Xylonite Company (BXL) made LDPE.

1959 saw BHC commission two new thermoplastics units producing the newer High Density Polythene (HDPE) using the Phillips solution process, which being significantly more rigid than the previous LDPE (Low Density Polythene) gave rise to the names of these Polymer plants as "Rigidex 1 + 2".

Then in 1960 a cumene-phenol plant was commissioned, utilising benzene from the Refinery and propylene in a process proprietary to the Distillers company.

Other units were added in the early 1960s at the Grangemouth complex including one to produce methanol (wood alcohol) plant, as well as G3 a third ethylene plant having significantly greater capacity than the previous two.

In 1965 a unit producing Acrylonitrile (AN) from propylene using another Distillers' proprietary process was opened, with the AN exported to then be made into polyacrylonitrile for synthetic fibre production. A factory adjacent the BXL one then opened, owned by Marbon Chemicals (later General Electric) and taking styrene, butadiene, and acrylonitrile feed from BHC to make high-performance ABS copolymer plastics with engineering and automotive application. This has since been demolished.

BP in 1967 bought out the DCL share of the BHC JV, to make this wholly owned by the company in the process creating BP Chemicals, covering a number of other UK chemical plants such as Hull Saltend.

=== North Sea oil: 1975–2004 ===
In 1975 the discovery of North Sea oil brought the commissioning of the Kinneil Crude Oil Stabilisation Terminal, connecting directly into the Forties pipeline system and adding Forties crude oil to the Refinery feed slate.

Part of the process included a degassing step for the crude in order to stabilise it, which generated significant volumes of useful hydrocarbon gases such as ethane, propane and butane. In 1993 the KG ("Kinneil Gas") ethylene plant was built to make use of the first of these available gases as abundant indigenous gaseous cracker feedstock. Its capacity was significantly expanded in 1997 and then again in 2001.

In 1977 the GTU (Gasoline Treatment Unit) / Benzene plant was commissioned to process the aromatic hydrocarbon streams arising from the refinery.

In 1978 the first of many Ethylene pipelines was built, connecting Grangemouth to ethylene plants in Wilton/Teesside. In 1985 the Mossmorran to Grangemouth pipelines were also added, connecting the site to the newly commissioned Fife Ethylene Plant owned by ExxonMobil.

A plant E1 ("Ethanol 1") was built in 1982 to manufacture industrial ethanol from the ethylene via a hydration reaction. This was augmented in 2002 by E2, a second plant producing pharmaceutical-grade Ethanol with a capacity of 180,000 tonnes per year. This was mothballed around a decade later due to poor demand, and both plants were permanently decommissioned in January 2025.

=== Ineos Purchase: 2004–2013 ===
In 2004 BP decided to divest its worldwide olefins and derivatives business: the sale included the refinery and connected petrochemicals complex (excluding the Kinneil terminal and Forties Pipeline System, which BP retained until FPS was sold to Ineos in 2017).

The new company created to run this business was named Innovene, which in December 2005 was purchased for $9 billion by Ineos, the largest privately owned chemicals company based in the UK.

In 2012 the Ineos O&P UK business was formed out of O&P Europe, covering the O&P (olefins and polymers) activities on the Grangemouth site and the Wilton liquefaction unit.

=== Shale Gas: 2013–Present ===
Following the 2013 strike resolution, Ineos announced plans to build an Ethane terminal at Grangemouth. This would utilise cheaper shale gas imports from the United States in order to significantly lower feedstock costs and improve the profitability of the business.

Construction of the massive concrete Ethane storage tank commenced in 2014, and this was commissioned in 2016 with the arrival of the inaugural 'Dragon' ship delivery of US shale gas. That same year O&P UK opened its purpose-built headquarters. In 2015 Ineos reached agreement with Shell ExxonMobil to supply US shale gas ethane from Grangemouth to the Fife Ethylene Plant (FEP) in Mossmorran.

In December 2025, Ineos announced they had secured a government support package worth around £150 million, of which £120 million provided by the Government of the United Kingdom, to support the future of the site following the recent announcement of ExxonMobil's Fife Ethylene Plant imminent closure in February 2026.

== Portrayal in Media ==
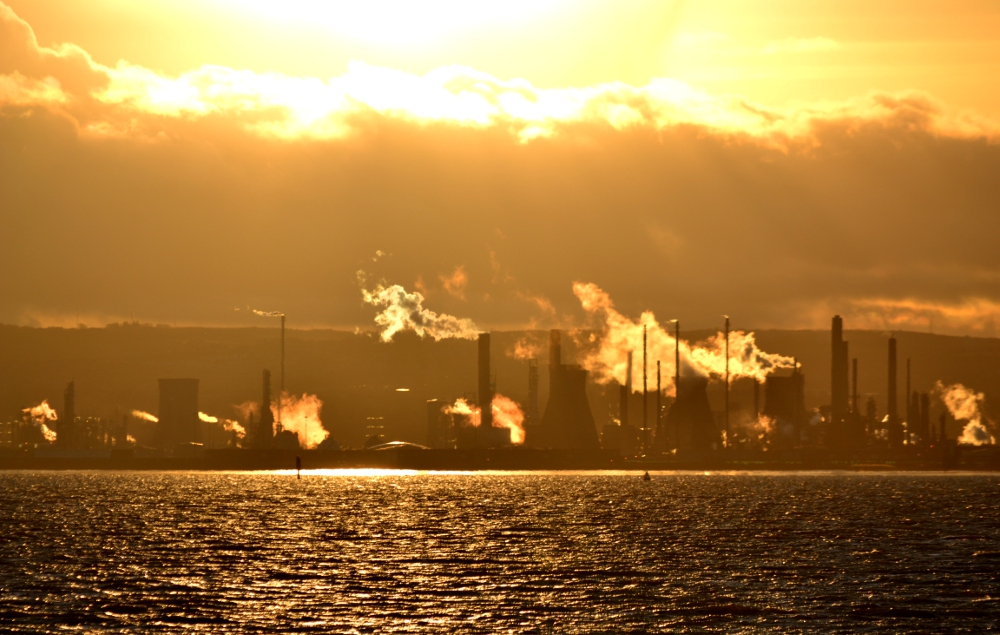
December 2011

INEOS Grangemouth remains a major landmark, with its numerous gas flares and cooling towers visible across a wide area of the Scottish Lowlands. Scenes from the 2013 film World War Z featuring Brad Pitt were filmed near the chemicals plant.

== Ineos industrial disputes ==
In 2008 Ineos proposed that plant workers start contributing towards their own pensions (a final salary pension scheme), instead of the existing non-contributory fixed salary pensions. The majority of Unite trade union's 1,250 members at Grangemouth voted in favour of strike action, which began on 27 April 2008, and lasted until 29 April.

There was further industrial action in 2013, when Ineos stated that the plant was not profitable and offered a survival plan requiring employees to accept worsened employment terms, particularly on pensions, which the Union rejected.

In October 2013, Ineos announced the petrochemicals part of the complex would close. On 24 October the union accepted a survival plan put forward by management. On 25 October 2013, it was announced the plant would stay open, with Unite agreeing to no further strike action for three years, moving to a new pension scheme and accepting a three-year pay freeze.

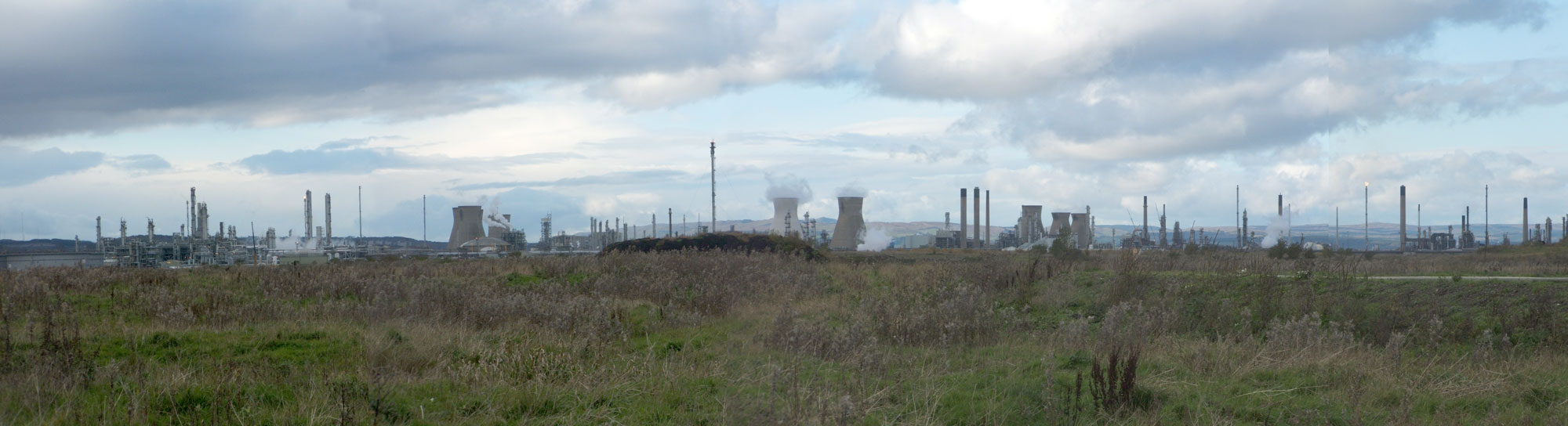
Panorama of Grangemouth petrochemical works, November 2006
