= Ineos Oxford Institute for AMR Research =

Research institute of the University of Oxford

Ineos Oxford Institute for Antimicrobial Research
- Established: January 2021
- Head: Christopher J. Schofield (Director of Chemistry) Timothy R. Walsh (Director of Biology) David Sweetnam (Chair of Advisory Board)
- Location: Oxford, United Kingdom
- Website: https://www.ineosoxford.ox.ac.uk/

The Ineos Oxford Institute for Antimicrobial Research (IOI) is a multidisciplinary research institute at the University of Oxford. The IOI was established in January 2021 following a £100m donation from INEOS, one of the world's largest manufacturing companies.

The institute collaborates across the University of Oxford and far beyond, but is rooted in the Department of Chemistry and Department of Biology, and aims to rapidly advance research, education and collaboration in search of solutions to tackle the growing threat of antimicrobial resistance (AMR).
