= Timothy Rutland Walsh =

Prof Timothy Rutland Walsh OBE
- Citizenship: Australian
- Occupation: Researcher
- Known for: NDM-1

Academic background
- Education: University of Bristol; University of Tasmania
- Thesis: Inducible β-lactamase expression in non-fastidious gram-negative bacilli (1995)

Academic work
- Era: 2000s-present
- Discipline: Microbiology
- Sub-discipline: Antibiotic resistance
- Institutions: Oxford University; Cardiff University; University of Bristol

Timothy Rutland Walsh OBE is a professor working at the University of Oxford. He is a specialist in antimicrobial resistance. Walsh is the Oxford Institute of Antimicrobial Research (IOI) Director of Biology. His work at IOI involves developing new antibiotics to use in animals, to replace use of human antibiotics. His IOI work also involves screening many chemicals to find new antimicrobials that overcome or impede antimicrobial resistance. Also he is involved in documenting the large scale effects of antibiotic resistance in low to middle income countries, such as China, Pakistan Bangladesh, Brazil and several African countries.

== Early life ==
Timothy Walsh was born in England but migrated to Tasmania when he was a teenager. His father was a biologist and mother an accountant. He studied at the University of Tasmania and earned a degree in medical laboratory science. He then worked at the Royal Hobart Hospital in the lab as a microbiologist whilst undertaking a master's degree in immunology and microbiology in University of Tasmania.

Walsh continued moved back to the UK and completed a PhD at Bristol University in 1995 reading biology studying β-lactamases.

After his PhD Walsh worked at the UK Medical Research Council in London, in the protein structure unit, and then in 1997 started teaching at the University of Bristol. In 2006 he started work at the Cardiff University as a professor with a title of chair in Medical Microbiology and Antibiotic Resistance.

== Discoveries ==
His research determined that a large proportion of ants, cockroaches, flies, moths and spiders were carrying extended spectrum cephalosporin and carbapenem resistant bacteria.

Prof. Walsh was the discoverer of New Delhi metallo-beta-lactamase 1 NDM gene and the mobil colistin resistance (MCR) gene. He also codiscovered the mobile tigecycline-resistance genes designated tet(X3) and tet(X4).

The naming of New Delhi metallo-beta-lactamase 1 caused controversy due to the highlighting of New Delhi in the name of a gene and its association with medical tourism.

As a result of Walsh and his colleague's findings, colistin in animals was banned in China in 2017.

== Qualifications ==
Walsh received a DSc from Bristol University in 2022 and received an OBE for services to microbiology and international development in the Queen's New Years Honours in 2020.

== Positions ==
Walsh is the principal investigator for Burden of Antibiotic Resistance in Neonates from Developing Societies (BARNARDS), a Gates Foundation project. He is also director of BALANCE (comparing the clinical and economic burden of AMR in Adults); and AVIAR (Arthropods as vectors of infection and AMR).
