= P&G London Plant =

- Procter & Gamble Product Supply
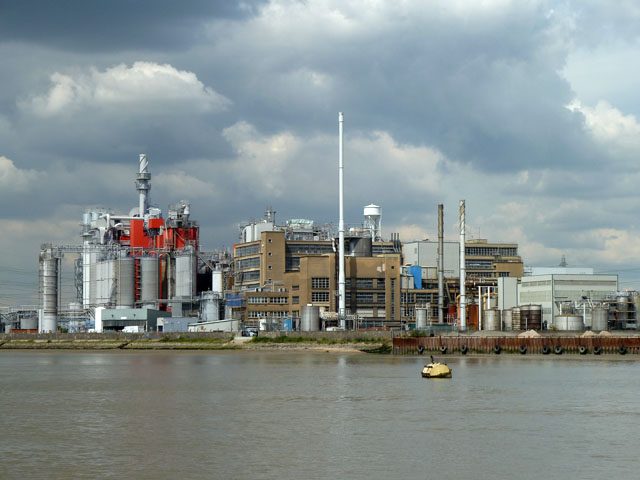
- Seen in June 2011

- Location within Essex
- Former names: P&G West Thurrock

General information
- Type: Detergent factory
- Architectural style: Factory
- Location: St Clements Road, RM20 4AL
- Coordinates: 51.4725°N 0.2950°E
- Elevation: 10 m (33 ft)
- Current tenants: P&G
- Construction started: 1937
- Completed: 1939
- Client: P&G

The P&G London Plant is a large chemicals plant on the side of the Thames Estuary, in West Thurrock that produces well-known laundry detergents.

== History ==
The factory started production in the late 1930s.

=== Construction ===
At a Thurrock Urban District meeting on Tuesday 6 July 1937, plans for a new factory at Thurrock were approved. In April 1938 the foundations were being built to 20 feet in depth. The site was 15 acres, with buildings up to 129 feet in height.

=== Detergent industry ===
P&G introduced Tide onto the UK market in 1950; Tide now has around 15% of the world market. Tide was introduced in 1950 to compete with Unilever's leading products. To compete, Unilever introduced Surf in 1952, followed by Omo in 1954.

In May 1963, the UK household detergent market was investigated by the government, reporting on 10 August 1966. It was found that 23% of the retail price, for both Unilever and P&G, was taken up by selling and promotion expenses, and the retailer's margin, for both, was 16%. Factory costs were 43%, of retail cost, for P&G, and slightly more for Unilever. The 1966 report found that Unilever and P&G had 96% of the UK market for laundry detergent powder products.

The industry was investigated by the National Board for Prices and Incomes in 1965.

=== Incidents ===
36 year old Kevin Scott-Dean, of Southend-on-Sea, was decapitated on a washing powder process line. P&G UK was fined £18,000 by local magistrates on 28 February 1996 for breaching the Health and Safety at Work etc. Act 1974. The plant manager was Dexter Mueller.

== Structure ==
The site has its own fire service unit.

The east-west London, Tilbury and Southend line, the Tilbury Loop Line, runs directly to the north of the site. There is a Co-op distribution centre nearby to the west, and a large National Grid substation to the south-west.

== See also ==
- List of cleaning products
- The former Unilever Warrington, which closed in October 2020

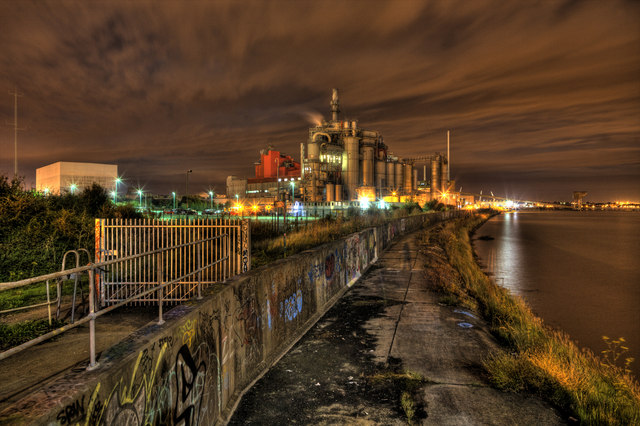
August 2008
