= Warfarin resistance =

- Warfarin resistance is inherited in an autosomal dominant manner

Warfarin resistance is a rare condition in which people have varying degrees of tolerance to the anticoagulant drug warfarin. In incomplete warfarin resistance, people only respond to high doses of warfarin; in complete warfarin resistance, the drug has no effect. This can be because the drug is metabolized quickly or because the clotting cascade does not interact with warfarin as it should. One gene that has been identified in warfarin resistance is VKORC1, a gene responsible for warfarin metabolism. It is inherited in an autosomal dominant pattern.
