= Isaac Spratt =

Isaac Spratt (1799 – 1876) was an English businessman who specialised in sale of toys, recreational equipment and, most notably, pamphlets describing the games of croquet and badminton. Spratt's description and promotion of those sports was influential in the early development and popularisation of both in England.

It is known he was born in Ibsley, Hampshire, and that he was married with four children. From 1840, he was a proprietor of a toy shop at 1 Brook Street (later no 18) in London's West End.

In 1856, he registered the first printed set of rules for the game of croquet and in 1860 printed a pamphlet called 'Badminton Battledore' a description of the ancient game of battledores and shuttlecocks as played competitively at Badminton House, the Duke of Beaufort's estate in Gloucestershire, England.
