= Flanshaw =

Suburb in Wakefield, West Yorkshire, England

Coordinates: 53.6836°N 1.5217°W

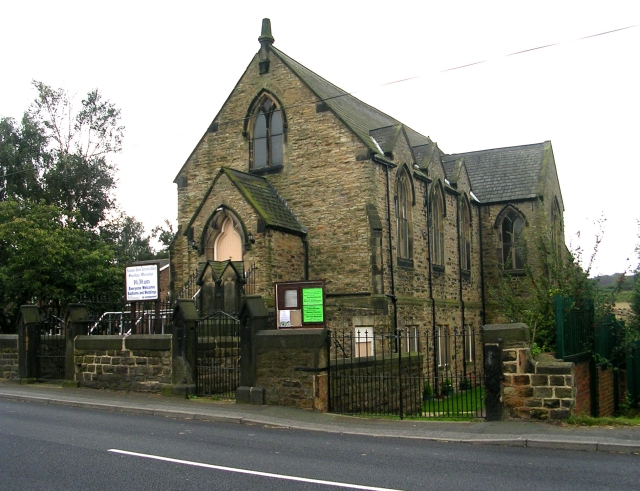
- Church on Flanshaw Lane

- Location within West Yorkshire
- Metropolitan borough: Wakefield
- Metropolitan county: West Yorkshire
- Region: Yorkshire and the Humber
- Country: England
- Sovereign state: United Kingdom
- Police: West Yorkshire
- Fire: West Yorkshire
- Ambulance: Yorkshire

Flanshaw is a suburb of Wakefield in West Yorkshire, England. It is located to the west of the city centre and is administered by the City of Wakefield. Part of the area is a council housing estate. The local primary schools are Flanshaw Junior and Infant School, and Flanshaw St. Michaels Junior and Infant School.

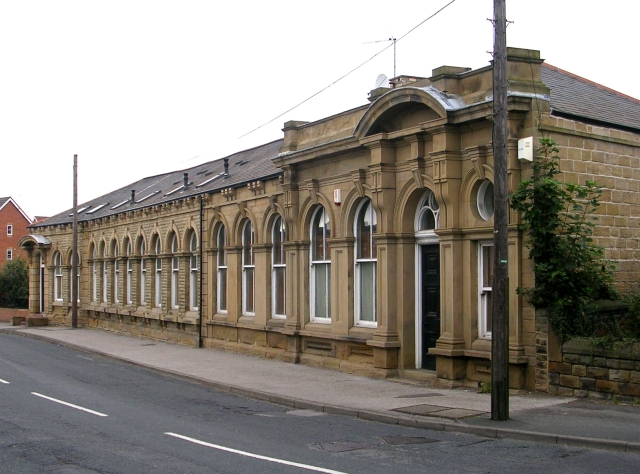
Former mill building
