= UK Battery Industrialisation Centre =

- UKBIC

- Location within Warwickshire

General information
- Type: Engineering Research Centre
- Location: Warwickshire, CV8 3AL
- Coordinates: 52.3747°N 1.487°W
- Elevation: 80 m (262 ft)
- Completed: 2020
- Cost: £108m

The UK Battery Industrialisation Centre (UK BIC) is a research centre in the United Kingdom, to develop new electrical batteries, for the British automotive industry. UKBIC provides over £60 million worth of specialized manufacturing equipment, supporting manufacturers, entrepreneurs, researchers, and educators in battery technology development. It has accelerated low carbon R&D, contributing to the UK's Net Zero goal by 2050.

== History ==
Funding for the UK Battery Industrialisation Centre (UKBIC) is supplied by United Kingdom Research and Innovation (UKRI). This financial support was announced on 29 November 2017. The facility was officially inaugurated by the British Prime Minister, Boris Johnson, in July 2021, as documented on the UKBIC's official website.

== Location ==
The UKBIC facility is located outside Coventry, adjacent to Coventry airport and about half a mile east of the junction between the A46 and A45. This is just outside the city boundary, in the extreme north of Warwick District, Warwickshire.
