= Edward John Bevan =

English chemist

Edward John Bevan (11 December 1856 – 17 October 1921) was an English chemist. He became a leader in the affairs of the Society of Public Analysts and editor of The Analyst.

Bevan was notable for his caustic wit. He was born in Birkenhead. After graduating, he became a chemist at the Scottish paper making firm of Alexander Cowan & Co. He met Charles Frederick Cross, and the pair then attended Owens College, Manchester.

Cross who was interested in cellulose technology went into partnership with Bevan in 1885, setting up as analytical and consulting chemists in New Court, Lincoln's Inn in London.

In 1888 they published what was to become a standard work on paper making. In 1892, together with another partner, Clayton Beadle (who was also an authority on paper making) they took out a patent for viscose which became the basis for the viscose, rayon and cellophane industries. In 1894 Cross and Bevan took out a patent for the manufacture of cellulose acetate - this was to become the industrial process for its manufacture.

He was awarded the John Scott Medal of The Franklin Institute in 1895.

== Sources ==
- Named Things in Chemical Industry
