= Charles Frederick Cross =

British chemist

Charles Frederick Cross FRS (11 December 1855 – 15 April 1935) was a British chemist.

Born in Brentford, Middlesex, his father, Charles James Cross (14 October 1827 - 19 November 1910), was a schoolmaster turned soap manufacturer. After graduating from King's College London, he went to Zurich Polytechnic and then, with his future partner, Edward John Bevan, to Owens College, Manchester.

Cross who was interested in cellulose technology and Bevan who had been a chemist at the Scottish papermaking firm of Alexander Cowan & Co. went into partnership in 1885 and set up as analytical and consulting chemists in New Court, Lincoln's Inn in London.

In 1888 they published what was to become a standard work on papermaking. In 1892, together with another partner, Clayton Beadle they took out a patent for Viscose which became the basis for the viscose, rayon and cellophane industries. In 1894 Cross and Bevan took out a patent for the manufacture of cellulose acetate - this was to become the industrial process for its manufacture.

Cross was a recipient of the Perkin Medal of the Society of Dyers and Colourists. He was awarded the John Scott Medal in 1895. He died in 1935.

== Sources ==
- Named Things in Chemical Industry
