= Ineos =

Privately owned multinational chemicals company

Ineos Group Limited

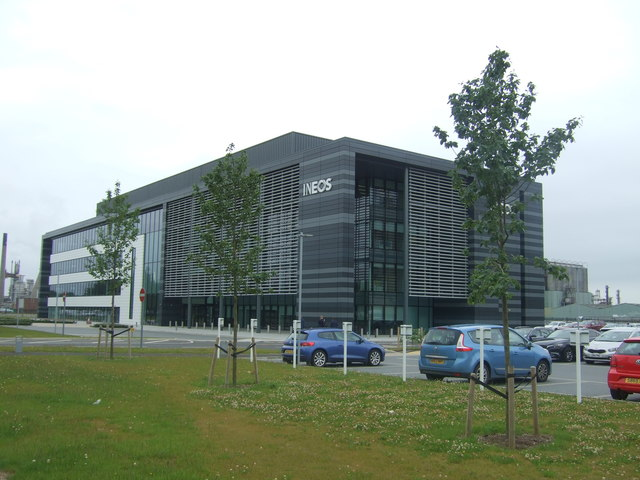
- Ineos building, Grangemouth
- Type: Private
- Industry: Chemicals
- Founded: 1998
- Founder: Jim Ratcliffe
- Headquarters: London, England
- Key people: Jim Ratcliffe (Chairman); Andy Currie (CEO); John Reece (Finance Director); Jim Dawson (Non-Executive Director)
- Revenue: €20.927 billion (2022)
- Operating income: 2,001,300,000 euro (2022)
- Net income: 2,000,600,000 euro (2022)
- Total assets: 17,081,400,000 euro (2021)
- Number of employees: 26,000 (2021)
- Subsidiaries: Ineos Automotive
- Website: ineos.com

Ineos Group Limited (/ˈɪniːjɒs/; IN-ee-yos) is a British multinational conglomerate headquartered and registered in London. As of 2025, it was the ninth largest chemical company in the world, with additional operations in fuel, packaging and food, construction, automotive, pharmaceuticals, textiles, and professional sports. Ineos is organised into about 20 standalone business units, each with its own board and operating almost entirely independently, although founder Jim Ratcliffe, who owns a controlling interest, and his associates, who collectively own a minority share, sit on their boards occasionally.

== Name ==
Ineos is derived from INspec Ethylene Oxide and Specialities, a previous name of the business. It is also named after Eos, the Greek goddess of dawn, and "neos" is Greek for something new and innovative. As well as being an acronym, Ineos states its name represents the "dawn of something new and innovative".

== History ==
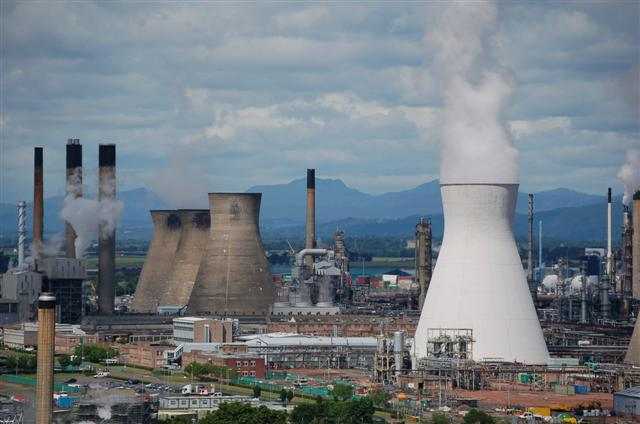
Part of the Grangemouth petrochemical plant in Scotland; the site has been an oil refinery since 1924.

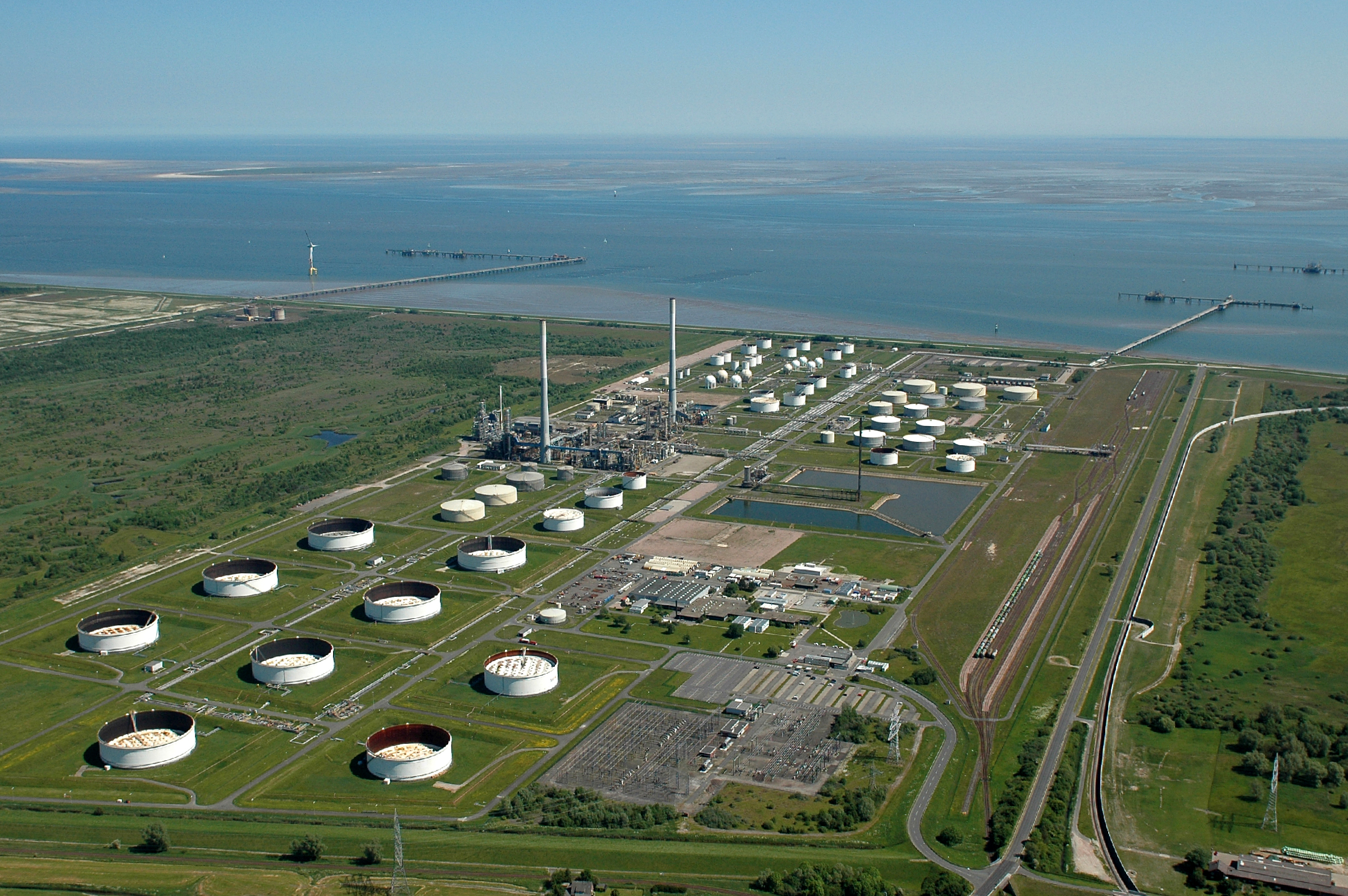
Part of the Ineos facility in Wilhelmshaven, Germany

In 1992, Inspec was formed by Jim Ratcliffe, previously a director of the U.S. private equity group Advent International, and by John Hollowood, for the purpose of executing a management buy-in of British Petroleum's (BP) chemicals arm.

=== First acquisitions ===
In 1995, Inspec bought BP's ethylene oxide and glycol businesses for £78 million, to become Inspec Ethylene Oxide Specialities.

In 1998, Ratcliffe, then a director of Inspec, established Ineos for the purpose of purchasing Inspec's ethylene oxide facility in Antwerp, Belgium. The £84 million purchase was funded by three entities: the Scottish investment house Murray Johnstone (£10 million), Ineos management (£1.5 million), and the investment bank BT Alex Brown (£72.5 million, raised through high-yield, non-investment grade bonds).

The company grew quickly through the acquisition of commodity chemical businesses from corporate giants such as BP, ICI and BASF.

=== Many subsidiaries acquired ===
There have been three distinct phases of Ineos's growth. The first phase spanned over ten years, with Ineos acquiring 22 companies between 1998 and 2008. The two most notable of these were Innovene, the olefins and derivatives and refining subsidiary of BP, in October 2005 for $9 billion, and ICI's commodity chemicals business in 2001.

The second phase between 2008 and 2010 saw a period of consolidation as the company tackled the impact of the global recession. As production of consumer goods, cars, and construction fell during this period, the company saw sales and earnings fall. During this period a major competitor LyondellBasell filed for bankruptcy. Some predicted a similar fate for Ineos but the company emerged from this period intact.

The third phase commenced in 2011. In this phase the company has continued to grow through a series of strategic joint ventures. In June 2011, the largest of these, Petroineos, was completed. It is a 50:50 joint venture between Ineos and PetroChina. It combines Ineos's refining interests at Grangemouth, Scotland, and at Lavéra near Martigues, France (about 30 miles west of Marseille), with PetroChina's access to upstream raw materials. In June 2011, Ineos and BASF combined their styrene businesses to form another 50:50 partnership, Styrolution. Ineos's growth has continued through this period, expanding production in the US and China. Most recently Ineos announced a joint venture with Solvay bringing together their European polyvinyl chloride businesses.

In October 2005 Ineos agreed to purchase Innovene, BP's olefins and derivatives and refining subsidiary, which had an estimated 2005 turnover of US$25 billion, for $9 billion. The deal, which was completed on 14 December 2005, roughly quadrupled Ineos's turnover, which was previously around $8 billion.

In 2007 Ineos formed a joint venture with Lanxess and created Ineos ABS, comprising Lanxess's activities in acrylonitrile butadiene styrene production, located in Tarragona. Ineos paid €35 million in a first tranche. In March 2010 Ineos Healthcare terminated its drug development programme for commercial reasons.

=== Establishment of a biorefinery ===
Ineos Bio broke ground on the Vero Beach demonstration plant in February 2011. The facility used a gasification fermentation process to convert cellulosic waste materials, such as yard and vegetative waste, into ethanol. In addition to having the capacity to produce 8 million gallons of ethanol, the plant could also produce up to 6 MW of electricity. Texas-based Frankens Energy purchased the former Ineos Bio Indian River Biorefinery in Vero Beach, Florida in 2018.

=== Plant closure threat over union demands ===
On 23 October 2013, Ineos announced the intent to close down its petrochemical plant in Grangemouth, Scotland, following Unite's1 rejection of a "survival plan" requiring employees to accept worse employment terms, particularly on pensions. Unite commenced industrial action, but, by 25 October 2013, following the threat of closure, the union capitulated and agreed to all Ineos' demands. The plant was agreed to stay open and strike-free for three years.

In September 2016, the company completed a new headquarters building at Grangemouth as part of a "site rejuvenation plan".

=== Purchase of Forties pipeline system ===
In April 2017, Ineos reached an agreement to buy the Forties pipeline system in the North Sea from BP for $250 million. The sale included termini at Dalmeny and Kinneil, a site in Aberdeen, and the Forties Unity Platform. Towards the start of 2019, in the wake of British MPs rejecting Theresa May's Brexit Deal, the company chose to fund a €3bn investment (£2.6bn) in petrochemical production in Antwerp, Belgium.

=== COVID-19 pandemic ===
In April 2020, during the COVID-19 pandemic, hand sanitiser was in short supply due to high demand. Ineos set up new plants to produce it using key ingredients the company had used to manufacture polymers, and provided it free to hospitals. Ineos has the capacity to produce a million bottles of hand sanitiser a month. In June 2020, Ineos signed a letter of intent to acquire the petrochemicals unit of BP for $5 billion. The business is focused on aromatics and acetyls. It has interests in 14 plants in Asia, Europe and the U.S., and produced 9.7 million metric tons in 2019. The deal was expected to close prior to the end of 2020. In September 2020, Ineos signed a 10-year deal to acquire offshore wind power from Engie’s Northern wind farm. Terms of the deal were not disclosed. In January 2021, it was announced that Ineos was to donate £100 million to Oxford University for a new research institute for tackling antibiotic resistance.

=== More acquisitions ===
On 22 September 2023 Ineos Enterprises acquired the Norwegian business of Eramet Titanium & Iron for $245 million. The firm is an "ilmenite transformation plant capable of producing titanium dioxide slag and high-purity pig iron."

On 9 December 2023 INEOS announced the acquisition of the LyondellBassells ethylene oxide business.

== Markets ==
Ineos provides products for many markets including: Fuels and Lubricants (23.3%), Packaging and Food (18.5%) and Construction (16.1%). Other markets include Automotive & Transport, White Goods & Durables, Pharmaceutical & Agrochemical and Textiles. The majority of Ineos's geographic earnings are distributed across Germany (16.8%), USA (16.1%), UK (12.3%), France (11.6%) and Benelux (10.8%).

Ineos is involved in renewable energy and is one of the world's leading pioneers in the development of generating sustainable energy from waste material.

Ineos reportedly runs operations with minimal head office management, feeling that "work teams" are better suited for handling of the workflow day to day, without middle-management.

In November 2014, Ineos announced plans to invest up to £640m in shale gas exploration in the UK. The company planned to use the gas as a raw material for its chemicals plants, including Grangemouth near Falkirk. Ineos CEO Jim Ratcliffe has criticized restrictions on fracking in the UK.

Ineos announced in July 2021 it was investing £25m in HydrogenOne Capital Growth, a fund that was aiming to raise £250m and float on the London Stock Exchange. HydrogenOne would invest in 'green hydrogen', made from renewable energy, and 'blue hydrogen' that is extracted from fossil fuel gas.

== Joint ventures ==
=== Petroineos ===
Petroineos is a refining and trading joint venture between Ineos and PetroChina formed in 2011. It is Europe's leading independent crude oil refiner, with a turnover of $15 billion. It has two refineries, one in Lavéra (part of Martigues), France, and one in Grangemouth, Scotland. The value of the Grangemouth chemicals plant, which Ineos had once valued at 400 million pounds was written down to nothing by them in October 2013 during conflict with the union. Later that month it was reported that PetroChina was unhappy with the return on the billion dollars cash they had paid for a 50% stake in the Grangemouth and Lavera refineries. According to a Hong Kong business analyst: "The European refineries are pretty much loss making. In future there won't be any similar investments".

In May 2020 Petroineos sought a £500 million bailout from the UK government for its Grangemouth refinery, due to declining oil sales. But environmental groups wrote to the Scottish first minister and the UK's prime minister, urging them to reject the appeal. The request came a year after Sir Jim Ratcliffe, who is said to be the UK's third-wealthiest person, relocated to Monaco, apparently for tax reasons.

In November 2023, Petroineos revealed plans to begin the work necessary to convert its operations at Scotland's only oil refinery, Grangemouth, into a business that imports finished fuel products, by 2025. No formal decision on the date of the transition to refinery to import terminal has been taken by the company, but it is reported that the announcement was attributed to the challenges faced due to global market pressures and the shift in demand for the types of fuels produced at Grangemouth.

=== Other ventures ===
As of 2014, PQ Corporation is a joint venture between Ineos (31%), CCMP (58%), and PQ management (11%). PQ is a global producer of inorganic chemicals, catalysts, and engineered glass products.

As of 2013, Solvay and Ineos were to create a 50:50 joint venture, which will see them combine their chlorvinyls sites in Europe. This joint venture will become the world's third-largest producer of polyvinyl chloride.

INEOS acquired a company called Texas City Operations, on December 1, 2023 from its competitor, Eastman Chemical Company. This includes a 600kt acetic acid plant and all associated third party activities.

=== Ineos Automotive ===
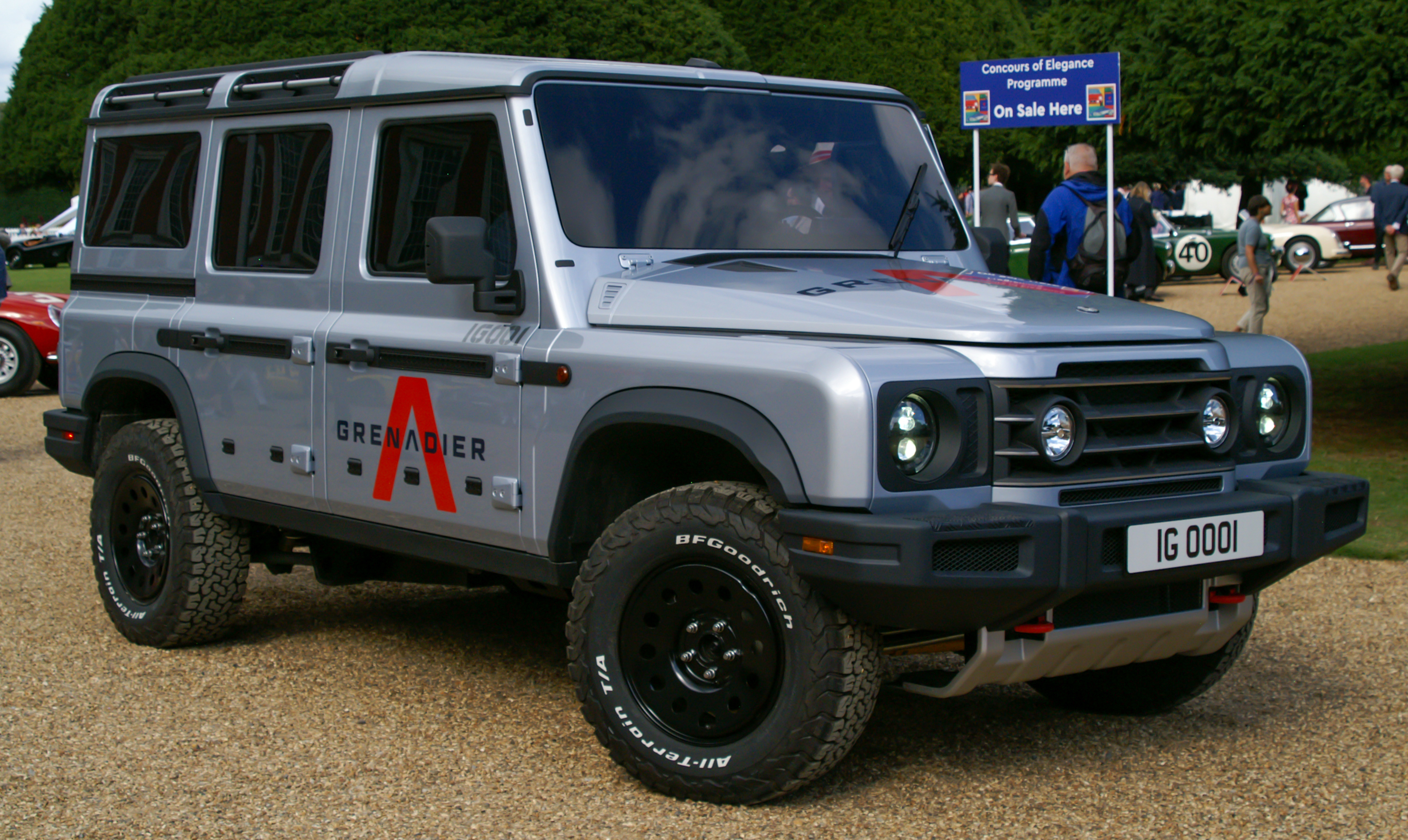
Ineos Grenadier

Ineos Automotive Ltd. was formed in 2017 to develop and manufacture an off-road utility vehicle, intended as a "spiritual successor" to the Land Rover Defender, under the codename Projekt Grenadier. In September 2019, it was initially announced that vehicle, now officially named Ineos Grenadier, would be manufactured in two new factories in Estarreja, Portugal (chassis and body) and Bridgend, South Wales (final assembly), with powertrains supplied by BMW. The launch was planned for 2022. In December 2020 Ineos announced the final assembly would take place in Hambach, France, instead of South Wales. The announcement was condemned by Welsh Labour MP Chris Elmore, who contrasted the decision to relocate production to the European Union with Ratcliffe's support for Brexit.

== Products ==
Ineos manufactures and distributes a wide range of petrochemicals, speciality chemicals and oil products:

Business	Products
Ammonia/nitric acid *	Ammonia and nitric acid
Baleycourt *	Esters, biodiesel, and chlorinated paraffins
Compounds *	Polyvinyl chloride compounds
Ethanol *	Ethanol
Inovyn	Brine, caustic soda, chlorinated solvents, chlorine derivatives, chlorine, ethylene dichloride, ethylene, propylene, polyvinyl chloride, recycled polyvinyl chloride and VCM
Melamines *	Formaldehyde and melamine formaldehyde resin
Nitriles	Acetonitrile, acrylonitrile, ammonium sulfate, hydrogen cyanide and maleic anhydride catalyst
Olefins and Polymers Europe	Benzene, butadiene, ethylene, high-density polyethylene, low-density polyethylene compounds, low-density polyethylene, linear low-density polyethylene, polymerisation Ziegler catalysts, polypropylene, propylene and toluene
Olefins and Polymers USA	Butadiene, butane, crude benzene, ethane/propane mix, ethylene, fuel oil, high-density polyethylene, mixed butenes, other bottoms liquids, polypropylene, propane, and propylene
Oligomers	Diisobutylene, the dimer of isobutylene (isoolefins/isoparafins), IA (isoamylene/TAME), linear alpha olefins, poly alpha olefins, polyisobutene, Technikum (cyclopentane, CP70, methylpropadiene)
Oxide	Acetate, acetate esters, alkoxilates, alkoxylates, ENB & glycol ethers, ethanolamines, ethyl acetate, ethylene glycol, ethylene oxide, glycol ethers, oxo alcohols, propylene glycol, and propylene oxide
Paraform *	Cyanates, dimethoxymethane, formaldehyde, hexamethylenetetramine, paraformaldehyde, and triallylcyanurate
Phenol	Acetone, alpha-methylstyrene, cumene and phenol
Salt *	Granular salt, pure dried vacuum salt, salt tablets, and undried vacuum salt
Solvents *	Diisopropyl ether, ethanol, isopropyl alcohol, methyl ethyl ketone, and s-butyl alcohol
Styrolution	ABS, AMSAN, ASA Resin, compounded grades, ethylbenzene, general purpose polystyrene, high impact polystyrene, NAS, polyethylbenzene, polystyrene polymers – HIPS, SAN, SBC (StyroFlex), specialty compounding, styrene, and styrene monomer
Trading and Shipping	Trades and supplies petrochemical feedstocks, hydrocarbons, energy and carbon credits for both internal and external customers
Technologies *	Licenses world class petrochemical technology for: polyethylene, polystyrene, vinyls, polypropylene, acrylonitrile, chlor-alkali
Upstream Shale	Natural gas, exploration and production of natural gas from on-shore shale deposits. Produces UK gas on the national grid.
Upstream Breagh	Supplies natural gas to one in ten UK households.

* Ineos Enterprises consists of the following sub-businesses: ammonia/nitric acid, Baleycourt, chlorotoluenes, compounds, ethanol, melamines, paraform, salt, solvents and sulphur chemicals.

== Industrial relations controversy ==
=== 2008 ===
In April 2008 Ineos, which was experiencing adverse economic conditions, was at the centre of an industrial relations dispute with Unite over pension entitlements of the workforce at its Grangemouth Refinery, when the company decided to close the final salary pension scheme to new employees. Unite claimed the Grangemouth workers were paid £6,000 less than those at comparable facilities. The 48-hour strike that followed caused panic buying of petrol throughout the country and the Forties production pipeline, a third of Britain's North Sea oil production, being closed. Ineos has been accused by some of buying assets then cutting costs through the introduction of new working practices, lower wages, and terminating pension schemes. According to Ratcliffe, some 65 per cent of salary costs at Grangemouth related to pensions.

=== 2013 ===
Stephen Deans, convener for Unite union at the Grangemouth plant where he worked, and also head of the Falkirk branch of the Labour party, was suspended from his employment at Grangemouth by Ineos in the summer of 2013, while they investigated what they said were accusations he had been using company resources for political campaigning; related to recruitment of Unite members in Ineos workforce to the local Labour branch, where the selection of a new parliamentary candidate was taking place after the de-selection of Eric Joyce. A Labour Party head office investigation into allegations that people had been made new members without them knowing or signing cleared Deans of the accusations, who had been suspended from the Labour party pending the investigation as well as the Unite candidate he was supporting.

Unite said Deans was being subjected to "sinister" treatment, and in October an overtime ban at Grangemouth plant, which according to Ineos had operated at a loss of £150 million per year for the previous four years, started in protest. A 48-hour strike was set for 20 October. Ineos announced the plant would be shut down before the strike and put forward a new deal direct to the workforce, warning that the plant might close permanently if it was rejected. Two-thirds of workers voted against accepting Ineos's proposal, which would have reduced pension, shift pay and redundancy entitlements in addition to a pay freeze. On 23 October Ineos announced the permanent closure of the petrochemical site at Grangemouth. The next day the Unite union reversed its position and agreed to Ineos's proposals, which included an undertaking not to strike for three years. Deans resigned from his job at Grangemouth on 28 October 2013 after Ineos presented its findings to his team.

== Criticism ==
In March 2016, Ineos's Port of Runcorn ChlorVinyls facility was found guilty of releasing caustic soda into the Manchester Ship Canal. The company was ordered to pay a fine of £166,650.

In 2018, Ineos applied for a test core drilling for shale gas at Woodsetts (United Kingdom). It was met by protests of residents. New plans for drilling at Woodsetts and Harthill had been applied and eventually approved by the Planning Inspectorate.

In January 2021, concerns were raised over Ineos's alleged poor environmental record after the University of Oxford accepted a £100 million donation from Ineos in order to establish the Ineos Oxford Institute for AMR Research.

On May 1, 2024, the Ontario Ministry of the Environment suspended Environmental Compliance Approval for Ineos Styrolutions' Sarnia, Ontario site, citing excessive benzene emission levels; the site must shut down operations until benzene emissions can be returned to "acceptable levels".

== Sports ==
INEOS has invested in elite sport across football, running, rugby, cycling, sailing, and Formula One. INEOS is the owner of multiple football clubs; French Ligue 1 side OGC Nice, Swiss Super League side FC Lausanne-Sport, and a 28.94% minority stake in the Premier League's Manchester United. INEOS is Principal Partner and third equal owner of the Mercedes-AMG Petronas F1 Team. INEOS also fully funds the INEOS Grenadiers cycling team. From 2018 to 2025, INEOS sponsored the INEOS Britannia team of Sir Ben Eaisley. The team performed well enough to become the Challenger of Record at the 37th America's Cup in 2024. The partnership fell apart and ended in January 2025, with reporting on the disagreements between racing team, and sponsor, stating INEOS claimed ownership of the current AC75 yacht hull, among other assets of the Athena Team. In 2026 INEOS released a statement on their intent to block Eaisley, and his team Athena Racing, from using the claimed assets, including the hull that contested the America's cup in 2024, in any future races while the matter of ownership is contested in court. INEOS was the Performance Partner to Eliud Kipchoge and the NN Running Team from 2019, until Dec 31st, 2025 when the agreement expired. In October 2019, INEOS supported Eliud Kipchoge to break the elusive 2-hour marathon barrier with Kipchoge completing the feat in a time of 1:59.40.2.

Beyond elite sport, INEOS supports The Daily Mile Foundation — a running initiative for school children to get them moving for 15 minutes a day.

In January 2025 INEOS failed to pay $10 million as part of its sponsorship deal to the rugby team, All Blacks, the sponsorship deal contract has since been cancelled.

In April 2026, INEOS signed a £87m deal with Netcompany, for them to become co-title partner of the Grenadiers grand tour cycling team.

== Charity ==
INEOS have invested in wide range of charitable projects in the fields of health, education, conservation and the community. In 2016, INEOS helped to establish The Daily Mile Foundation with former Headteacher Elaine Wyllie. The Daily Mile is a free initiative for primary schools, whereby all children participate in 15 minutes of daily physical activity outside in fresh air, to improve their health and wellbeing. In 2022, over 3 million children participated in 86 countries worldwide.

In January 2021, also in the field of public health, INEOS announced a donation of £100M to establish the INEOS Oxford Institute for Antimicrobial Resistance (AMR) Research, to help tackle the threat of drug-resistant infections worldwide.

INEOS chairman Sir Jim Ratcliffe also funds sustainable conservation through a fishing project in remote North East Iceland, seeking to reverse the decline of the wild North Atlantic salmon, and funds ecotourism and conservation work in Tanzania through a joint venture with Asilia Safaris.
