= The Old Internationals' Association (Nursing) =

The Old Internationals' Association, which became known as the Florence Nightingale International Nurses’ Association, was created in 1925 for alumni of the international courses for nurses, originally hosted at Bedford College for Women in London, England.

== The Old Internationals' Association ==
In 1925 The Old Internationals' Association was founded by nurses of 35 countries who had undertaken the post certificate courses under the auspices of the League of Red Cross Societies (LRCS) at Bedford College and the Royal College of Nursing. Maynard Carter was one of the initiators and was Honorary President until her death. Marjorie Killby who was a student in the first cohort of courses was also involved in the founding of the Old Internationals’ Association.

The association was formed so that past students of the courses could keep in touch with each other, who were known as 'Old Internationals'. The Association held regular reunions and summer schools. A Summer School was held at Bedford College in 1928 with 82 Old Internationals in attendance from 26 countries. In 1952 a Summer School was held at Bedford College with the theme of 'Human Relationships' attended by 90 Old Internationals'. The Jubilee dinner in 1955 was held in the House of Commons. The 1964 summer school had the title 'International nursing – an influence for world peace' and was held at Edinburgh University.

The Association changed its name to the International Florence Nightingale Nurses Association in 1964 and continued until 1975. Killby, who was Secretary for many years, had tried to keep the association going but it became more difficult to maintain close contacts and keep the personal touch of the original organisation. She and her husband hosted Old Internationals at their home informally in 1952.

== History of the Bedford College courses ==
The LRCS initiated the first international postgraduate courses for nurses in 1920, with the first course being public health nursing. This need for nurses trained in public health was prompted by the devastation caused by the First World War and the 1918 influenza pandemic. Nurses were identified by National Red Cross societies and nominated for attendance with between 15 and 20 nurses joining each cohort. They were initially run by the LRCS with the College of Nursing in Britain, the University of London, the International Council of Nurses, the Rockefeller Foundation, and the leaders of nursing in North America.

For the first year the public health course took place at King’s College for Women, Campden Hill, London. Florence Waters, Assistant Director of the Nursing Division of the LRCS was in charge of the programme. The first cohort of international students stayed at 11, Observatory Gardens, Campden Hill. The objective of the LRCS was to develop educational propaganda in time of peace. From the second year the courses took place at Bedford College for Women for the academic lectures for the next 18 years.

The curriculum included anatomy, physiology, hygiene, bacteriology, chemistry, elementary science, sociology and household work. It also included information on dispensing and students obtained an insight into nursing methods in connection with the Salamon Centre at Guy’s Hospital and Dr Truby King’s system of caring for mothers and babies at Trebovir Rd Earl’s Court. During holiday periods the students experienced nursing in rural areas. The course included practical work in hospitals around London and later further afield in Britain and mainland Europe. The students had guest lecturers from other colleges including King’s College, University College and the London School of Hygiene and Tropical Medicine.

The Hospital Administrators and Teachers in Schools of Nursing course commenced in 1925. From 1924 the nurses lived at 15 Manchester Square, London during their studies, a residence leased by the LRCS . This initiative was at the instigation of the President of the Czechoslovak Red Cross, Dr Alice Masarykova, and with support from other Red Cross Societies. Each room of the house was furnished by a different country and contained embroideries, ceramics, pictures and carpets from a range of countries given by students. It was bombed in World War II which led to the joint war office of the British Red Cross Society and the Order of St John donating Burleigh House for the use of the Old Internationals and students on the courses.

The Florence Nightingale International Foundation was founded in 1934 and took on the continuance of the courses at this point and took over Manchester House. The courses attracted students from all over the world including Japan, India, and countries across Europe. A total of 341 nurses from 49 different countries are documented as participants on the courses throughout the interwar period. The courses stopped in 1939 at the outbreak of World War II.

== Notable nurses ==
The following list includes Old Internationals who were alumni of the Bedford College courses:

- Marjorie Mayson Killby - Public health course 1922-23
- Ida Simmons - Public health course 1922-23
- Maynard L. Carter - Public health course 1922-23
- Janet Moore - Nurse administrators and teachers in schools of nursing course 1924-25
- Violet Maud Evelyn Jones - Nurse administrators and teachers in schools of nursing course 1927-1928
- Elaine Hills-Young - Nurse administrators and teachers in schools of nursing course 1928-29
- Eleanor Jeanette Murray - Public health course 1930-31
- Barbara Quaile - Nurse administrators and teachers in schools of nursing course 1934-35
- Kathleen Scrymgour - 1935-36
- Daisy Bridges - 1936-37
- Theodora Turner - 1938-39
- Edith Helen Paull - 1938-39
- Eileen Rees - 1939-40

Those who had involvement in setting up the courses:

- Alice Masaryková - was involved in setting up the house at Manchester Square
- Alicia Lloyd Still
- Katherine Olmsted
- Alice Fitzgerald
