= Sturch =

Sturch is a surname of English origin. Notable people with the surname include:

- Elizabeth Jesser Reid (1789-1866), born Elizabeth Jesser Sturch, English social reformer, anti-slavery activist, and philanthropist
- James Sturch (born 1990), American politician
- William Sturch (1753?-1838), English Unitarian theological writer
