= Maynard L. Carter =

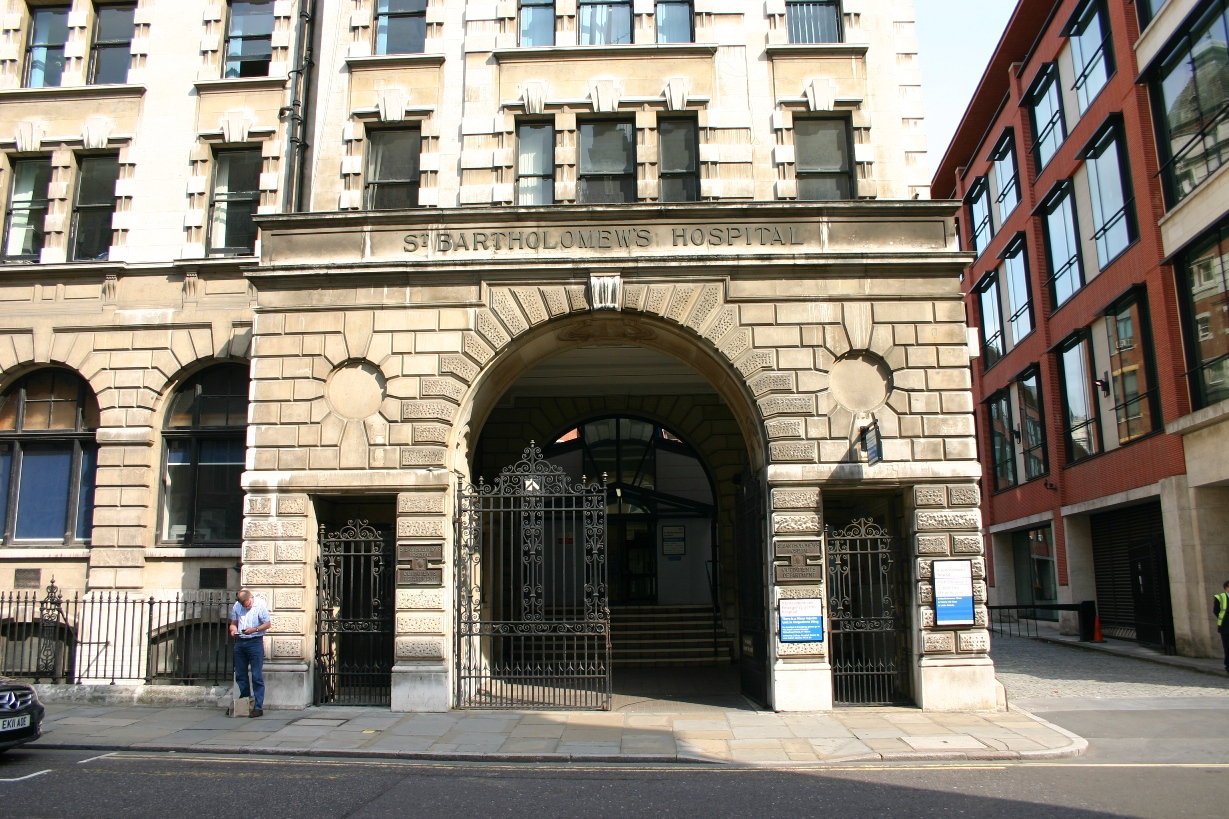
St Batholomew's Hospital entrance

Maynard Linden Carter ARRC (nee Carthew) (1886 - 1962), was a British nurse who worked internationally and was Chief of the Nursing Division of the League of Red Cross Societies.

== Early life ==
Carter was born in 1886 in Morro Velho, Minas Gerais, Brazil, of British parentage.

== Education and early career ==
Carter trained as a nurse at St Batholomew’s Hospital, London between 1907 and 1911. Early in her career she was attracted to the preventive branch of nursing and in 1911 joined the Ranyard Nurses, founded by Ellen Henrietta Ranyard in 1868 to bring nursing into the homes of London’s poor. She worked in Mitcham and Stoke Newington, suburbs of London. She was mobilised during the war in the Territorial Army Nursing Service, working as military nurse for 4 and a half years.

In 1921 she went to Czechoslovakia with 40 other nurses and social workers as part of Lady Muriel Paget’s Mission. Here they distributed relief supplies on behalf of the Czech Government collected in England. In 1921 Carter joined the League of Red Cross Societies and took a leading part in the organisation of the courses for international nursing students at Bedford College. She undertook the public health course there in the 1922-23 session. Carter was appointed Director of the League of Red Cross Societies in Paris in 1927, taking over from Katherine Olmsted. She resigned from this position which was based in Paris in 1938 on health grounds. The Old Internationals' Association for alumni of the Bedford courses, was founded by Carter and she was Honorary President until her death.

Carter served as an elected council member of the Royal College of Nursing.

== Personal life ==
Carter married Cecil Carter who was Headmaster of King’s College, Bangkok prior to the outbreak of World War 1. They lived just outside Camberwell Hospital which was the first London General Territorial Hospital where Carter worked as Sister. Her husband died suddenly in 1921 aged 52, leaving her a very young widow.

Carter obtained her pilot’s licence in France and spent some of her vacations flying at Hatfield air strip. She supported the Red Cross Societies to train nurses for service in air ambulances and for aerial relief. She was a talented potter and a skilled wood carver, producing furniture. She was also a linguist.

Following her retirement she moved to a 16th century thatched cottage in Monks Risborough, Buckinghamshire.

== Death ==
Carter died on March 2, 1962. Her ashes were scattered in the churchyard at the bottom of her garden.

== Honours ==
Carter was awarded the Florence Nightingale Medal in 1937. This medal is awarded in alternate years by the International Red Cross Committee for a nurse distinguished in nursing service on the recommendation of the national Red Cross Societies.

Carter was awarded the Associate Royal Red Cross (ARRC) medal. She was also awarded Latvian and Siamese decorations and the Red Cross awards of 7 European countries.

Carter served as an elected member of the Ranyard Nurses, the nursing branch of the Ranyard Mission from 1939 until 1951
