= Geometry from the Land of the Incas =

- Website type: Educational
- Owner: Antonio Gutierrez
- Creator: Antonio Gutierrez
- Website: https://www.gogeometry.com/
- Commercial: No

Geometry from the Land of the Incas is a free geometry website funded by advertising, aimed mainly at high school and college age students.

Developed by Antonio Gutierrez, the site uses sound, dynamic geometry, animations, science, and Incan history with the goal of raising students' interest in Euclidean geometry. Numerous problems are presented with step-by-step solutions for each proof.

Around 2003, the website won several minor awards from educational publications, including One of the Top 10 educational Web Sites Canada's SchoolNet's in 2003, the Knot #284 Canadian Mathematical Society, NCTM Illuminations Web Byte (National Council of Teacher of Mathematics), and one of 30 "Desert Island Theorems" of the book: "The Changing Shape of Geometry Celebrating a Century of Geometry and Geometry Teaching", the Mathematical Association UK.

The author designed the site for teachers, students and parents, and anyone else curious about geometry, mathematics, popular science, geography, Incan history and visual perception.

The site moved to www.gogeometry.com on November 5, 2007 from www.agutie.homestead.com.

== Site contents ==
Geometry from the Land of the Incas is divided into nine major categories: Geometry theorems and problems, Inca Geometry, Quizzes, Puzzles, Quotations, Inspiration, Landscapes, Mindmaps, and Geometric art. This site does include many advertisements and some people say they find it has very little, if any, interesting exploration of the Inca's understanding of geometry.

== Technical requirements ==
Requires Flash Player 5.0 or higher version, Java Runtime Environment 1.3 or higher version and JavaScript.

This site is best viewed using Internet Explorer version 6.0 or higher, or Firefox version 1.5 or higher and at a display resolution of 1024 × 768 or higher.
