= Eleanor Smith (activist) =

Irish linguist and supporter of women's education

- Born: Eleanor Elizabeth Smith; 30 September 1822
- Died: 15 September 1896 (aged 73)
- Occupation: Educational activist
- Known for: Founder of Somerville College; Member of the Oxford School Board

Eleanor Elizabeth Smith (30 September 1822 – 15 September 1896) was an Irish educational activist. She became one of three trustees running Bedford College. At the time Bedford College was one of the few places where women might receive something approaching university level education. Bedford College was said to be the first British institution run by women

== Early years ==
Smith was born in Dublin, Ireland, the daughter of John Smith (1792–1828) and his wife, Mary Murphy. Her father was a barrister, but he died in 1828, and Mary then moved the family to various locations in England before settling in Ryde on the Isle of Wight. Smith had thirteen siblings, with her younger brother Henry John Stephen Smith becoming a prominent mathematician. Smith developed a strong interest in languages, teaching herself Hebrew when she was only seven years old. She later traveled widely around Europe, indulging her interest in European literature.

== Career ==
In the 1860s, Smith moved to Oxford, where her brother was working, and organised a series of lectures for women by professors affiliated with the University of Oxford. Becoming known as an expert on women's education, she was called as a witness to the 1864 Royal Commission on Schools. As a result of its recommendations, school boards were formed across England and Wales in 1870, and Smith was elected to the Oxford School Board – the only woman elected in Oxford, and one of only seven across England.

Other members of the school board determined that education in the city should remain run by religious organisations, but Smith argued that they should instead set up a non-denominational board school. She was unsuccessful in this, and stood down from the board in 1873, when her brother died.

In 1879, Smith was a founder of Somerville College, one of the first two Oxford colleges for women. She served on its council, and also became a trustee of Bedford College, London. The founder of Bedford College, Elizabeth Reid died in 1866 and left the college in the hands of Eliza Bostock, Jane Martineau and Smith. The three of them were concerned that Bedford College School was to become Anglican under the head, Francis Martin. They closed the school.

Smith developing an interest in health, she served on the boards of the Radcliffe Infirmary and Sarah Acland Home, and as a director of the city's Provident Dispensary.
