= Lucy Harrison =

English headmistress (1844–1915)

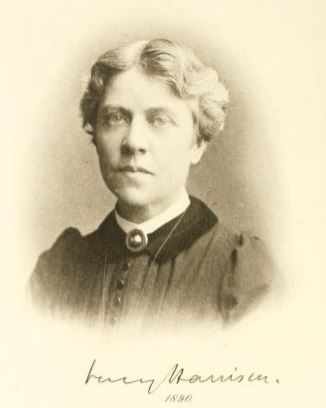
- Born: Emma Lucy Harrison; 17 January 1844; Birkenhead, England
- Died: 15 May 1915 (aged 71)
- Education: Bedford College
- Occupation: Headteacher
- Partner: Amy Greener
- Parent: Anna and Daniel Harrison

Lucy Harrison (17 January 1844 – 15 May 1915) was a teacher at Bedford College School, and later founder and then head of Gower Street School for Girls and then The Mount School, York.

== Early life ==
Emma Lucy Harrison, known as Lucy, was born on 17 January 1844 in Birkenhead, England, as the youngest of eight children of Daniel Harrison and his wife, Anna Botham of Uttoxeter. When Harrison was five years old, her family went to live at Springfield, Egremont. In the autumn of 1854 the Harrisons moved to Marshalls. In her youth, Harrison was able to meet Dante Gabriel Rossetti, and Ford Madox Brown, among other notable artists.

Harrison attended Bedford College for two years studying Latin, History, and English Literature which she later identified as the starting-point of her intellectual activities. She noted a regret that she had not studied science and mathematics more extensively.

== Career ==
In 1866, Harrison began teaching initially on a temporary and later permanent basis at Bedford College School, where she would teach Latin, English subjects, and Natural History. The school was led by Frances Martin who the trustees feared was making the school Anglican. In 1868, the trustees Eliza Bostock, Jane Martineau and Eleanor Smith closed the school.

In the summer of 1870, Harrison was allowed an extension of holiday and went to the United States with her brother-in-law, Ellis Yarnall, who had been on a visit to England. She joined her sister Annie, who had been staying for some time in Philadelphia with their married sister, Mrs. Margaret Yarnall, and they spent two months together. They went westward, visited Chicago, sailed on a steamer on the Mississippi River, saw the Niagara Falls and other American wonders.

Soon after her return from America, Harrison moved to Gower Street, where she founded Gower Street School for Girls. In 1875, she became sole Head of the School. Enrolment at the school grew under her leadership.

During these busy years of teaching, Harrison did much outside work of various kinds, the most strenuous perhaps being that at the Working Women's College, and her work in connection with her friend Octavia Hill's scheme for the housing of the poor. She collected weekly rents, and in various ways came into personal touch with some of the London poor. Lucy Harrison's sister, Mary Harrison, became Octavia Hill's special friend.

Lucy Harrison was always to the fore in matters relating to education; she belonged in its early days to the School-mistresses' Association, and was one of the first members of the Teachers' Guild. Besides doing a great deal of reading, she continued her study of Anglo-Saxon, and attended courses of Lectures, in particular those given by Professor Hales on English Literature. She was also engaged in bringing out her book, Spenser for Home and School, which was published by Bentley in 1883. She wrote several short plays for her pupils to act, and some years later she made a translation of Moliere for the Gower Street School.

While a student at Gower Street School, poet Charlotte Mew became infatuated with Harrison, and like Harrison adopted a short, signifying female independence.

After nearly twenty years' connection with the Gower Street School, Harrison's health broke down and she determined to give up her work and carry out the plan she had for years in her mind, to build a little house and live in the country. Her ambition from girlhood had been to own a piece of land and build herself a house and have a garden and a library. Her thoughts turned to Wensleydale, the remote Yorkshire valley where her father was born. Hence in the summer of 1883 she went with her widowed sister, Mrs. Macdonell, to Bainbridge for several weeks. They visited the old family house at Countersett, dated 1650, with Reuben Harrison's name scratched on one of the window-panes. She made many inquiries about a suitable plot of freehold land available for building purposes, and at length she found for sale on the Hawes Road a field of four acres. This was "Cupples Field", which she ultimately bought, and during the next two years her great interest was the planning of her house and garden. The building was not actually begun till 1885. John Bentley, the well-known architect who built the Roman Catholic Cathedral at Westminster, made the plans. The school was passed over in 1885 to her colleague and lover Amy Greener.

After four years of rest from strain and teaching, Harrison's health was restored, and she was beginning to feel less contented with her "Hermit life", as she called it, when she heard that the post of Headmistress at The Mount School, York, was soon to be vacant. In November 1889, urged by some of her friends, she applied for this position and was appointed.

Harrison began her work at The Mount School in January 1890. Boarding-school life was a new experience to her and for the first few months she still felt very anxious as to her suitability for the work she had undertaken. She was naturally shy and diffident, and it was a severe ordeal to find herself suddenly set down amongst a crowd of strangers with a perplexing number of new duties and a heavy weight of responsibility. At first, the sense of loneliness and dread of failure were intense, but she gradually adapted herself to the unfamiliar surroundings; slowly she made friends with the staff, and in time began to feel that she was gaining some hold on the girls.

More than 400 girls passed through the school during the twelve years Harrison was headmistress, and many important changes were made in The Mount School, and the way in which these were carried out, with the ultimate concurrence of all concerned, gave ample proof of her tact, discretion and open-mindedness. The hours of meals were changed to times more in accordance with the modem interpretation of the laws of health, and many wise alterations were gradually made in the curriculum; the three-term system — instead of half-years — was introduced; a fine gymnasium was built and a gymnastic mistress appointed; the garden was enlarged and the space for out-of-door games thus extended; a house was taken opposite the School-building where a Kindergarten class and a Junior School for day-pupils was established. Structural alterations and additions were also made from time to time to meet the requirements of extra accommodation or increasing numbers. Harrison took keen interest in the plans for an extensive new wing which was finished the year after she left the School.

The Mount School was famed for its many out-of-school interests and pursuits. Before Harrison's day, there were already a Natural History Society with various branches, a Poetry Learning Association (known as P.L.A.), and a Debating Society. During her time, there arose and flourished societies for Archaeology, Astronomy, Meteorology, Photography, and others.

== Personal life ==
In January 1895 Amy Greener, who had given up the school in London, joined The Mount School staff as an English mistress. They became friends and lovers.

The strain and responsibility of boarding-school life were great, and gradually Harrison's health gave way — she had had an attack of rheumatic fever in 1891–92 which had affected her heart — and after twelve years she retired in 1902 from the post of Headmistress.

Harrison left the school under the direction of H. Winifred Sturge, who as Second Mistress had for nine years been a member of the staff.

For about four years, Harrison and Greener lived in York near The Mount School and Harrison continued her English Literature lessons in all the classes, while Greener did secretarial work for the new Headmistress. There was continual intercourse between the School and Telford Terrace, and both staff and pupils took advantage of the opportunity of an occasional quiet talk with Harrison.

In the spring of 1907, she and Greener returned to her little home at Bainbridge. Harrison died on 15 May 1915 and was buried in the Friends Burial Ground at Bainbridge.
