= Mathematical Pie =

British magazine

Mathematical Pie was an eight-page British magazine published three times a year, aimed at mathematics students aged 10 to 14. It contained mathematical facts, puzzles, and challenges intended to aid teaching. It was published by the Mathematical Association, based in Leicester. The editor in 2015 was Wil Ransome.

The magazine was created in 1950 by Roland Collins. From May 1956 to May 1967, the publication carried the first 10,022 digits of decimal expansion of pi across the bottom of each page of successive issues.. In 2023, the magazine merged with two other Association publications to form Mathematical Angles.
