= Daniel Harrison (merchant) =

English tea and coffee merchant

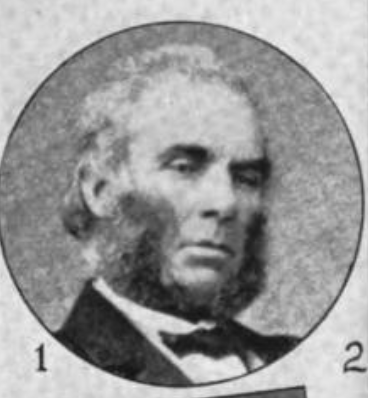
Daniel Harrison

Daniel Harrison (10 March 1795 – 1873) was an English tea and coffee merchant. He was a Quaker, and a founder of Harrisons & Crosfield.

== Early life ==
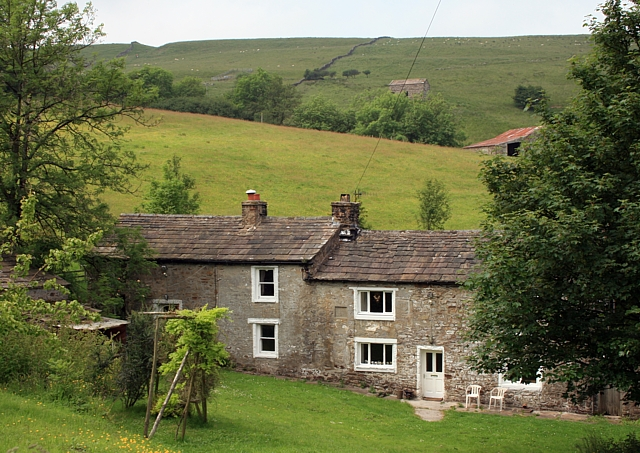
Countersett Hall, birthplace of Daniel Harrison and later called The Courts, today

He was the son of Reuben Harrison and his wife Sarah Thompson (or Margaret), born at Countersett in the Yorkshire Dales into an old Quaker family. He was the eldest of a family of 13 children. While he was still young, around 1802, his parents moved to Rochdale in Lancashire. Daniel Harrison of Edgworth was admitted to Ackworth School in 1807.

Harrison became a Liverpool coffee dealer. He married in 1823, at which time he was living in Everton, Liverpool. He is later recorded as being in business in Liverpool before 1825. A partnership between Daniel Harrison and Joseph Ecroyd of Liverpool, as coffee dealers, was dissolved in 1834. He was for a time in a partnership with Octavius Waterhouse, as wholesale tea and coffee dealers. After losses, caused by an investment by Waterhouse, it was dissolved in 1840.

== Harrisons & Crosfield ==
With his brother Smith Harrison (born 1818), and Joseph Crosfield, Daniel founded Harrisons & Crosfield in Liverpool, in 1844. The new partner Crosfield (1821–1879) was also from a Quaker background. He had worked for Harrison & Waterhouse, and was the son of George Crosfield (1785–1847), and nephew of Joseph Crosfield (1792–1844) of Warrington, the noted soap manufacturer. The company's working capital was £8,000.

At that time Harrison's family lived in Birkenhead. In 1849 they moved north, to Egremont; a family connection to the area existed, since their maternal grandfather Charles Wood (see below) constructed an ironworks there. From the early days, Smith Harrison attended the tea sales in London's Mincing Lane. In Liverpool, the company did business at 6 Temple Place.

In 1855, the company migrated to London, which had become the destination of the tea clippers. The business had prospered from the start, and became one of the top dealers in tea. The premises were at 3 Great Tower Street. One of Harrison's sons, and two of Joseph Crosfield's sons, in time became directors. Marshalls in Romford was leased as the family home, after the move.

== Later life ==
There were further moves of the Harrison family. The parents joined some of the girls for a time in Dieppe, in 1859. They moved back, to Highgate in London. There was a period in Leicester.

Around 1864, they moved again to Beckenham, Kent. In later life, Harrison resided there.

== Family ==
Harrison married in 1823 Anna Botham of Uttoxeter: of Anna's two sisters, Mary became Mary Howitt on marrying William Howitt, and Emma married a first cousin of Daniel, Harrison Alderson. Daniel and Anna had eight children. They included:

- Mary, the eldest, friend of Octavia Hill.
- Charles, the eldest son, married in 1855 Mary Jeffreys, daughter of Julius Jeffreys. He was a director of Harrisons & Crosfield, dying in 1916.
- Margaret Ann (1827–1899), married in 1858 Ellis Yarnall.
- Alfred (1832–1891), cleric.
- Anna Jemima, married in 1871 James Macdonell.
- Agnes, married in 1873 Sir John Macdonell.
- Lucy Harrison (1844–1915), headmistress, the youngest.

Anna Harrison (1797–1881) was the daughter of Samuel Botham and his wife Anna Wood. She wrote for The Kaleidoscope and The Dial of Love. Anna Wood was the youngest child of Charles Wood the ironmaster, by his second wife.
