= John Reid (physician) =

John Reid (1776 – 2 July 1822) was an English physician.

== Life ==
Reid was born at Leicester in 1776. After attending the school of Philip Holland, a dissenting minister, Reid studied at the Hackney nonconformist academy for five years. He then studied medicine at Edinburgh University, graduating M.D. on 12 September 1798, reading a thesis De Insania. He became a licentiate of the College of Physicians of London on 25 June 1804.

Reid gave lectures on the theory and practice of medicine, and was physician to the Finsbury Dispensary. His house was in Grenville Street, Brunswick Square, and he died there on 2 July 1822.

== Works ==
Reid published in 1801 a translation from the French An Account of the Savage Youth of Avignon; in 1806 A Treatise of Consumption, in which he stated his belief that tubercles were inflammatory products, and had no real resemblance to caseous disease of lymphatic glands; and in 1816 Essays on Insanity, of which an enlarged edition appeared in 1821 as Essays on Hypochondriasis and other Nervous Affections. He was also a contributor of medical reports to the Monthly Magazine.

The Dictionary of National Biography commented of Reid that "he generally writes with good sense, and relates a few interesting cases of mental disease, but has added nothing to medical knowledge."

== Family ==
Reid married Elizabeth Jesser Sturch in 1821; she was the daughter of William Sturch. He left his wife an inheritance which she used to found Bedford College.
