= Maurice Hayward =

British colonial administrator (1868–1964)

Sir Maurice Henry Weston Hayward KCSI (2 June 1868 – 31 August 1964) was a British colonial administrator who was the acting governor of Bombay during the British Raj from 8 December 1923 to 10 December 1923.

Hayward was the son of Rev. Robert Baldwin Hayward. He was educated at Harrow School and at St John's College, Cambridge.

He was knighted in the 1923 Birthday Honours and appointed a Knight Commander of the Order of the Star of India (KCSI) in the 1925 Birthday Honours.
