= Sue Singer =

British mathematics educator

Sue Singer is a British mathematics educator. She is the former headmistress of Guildford High School, a girls' school in Surrey, the former president of the Girls' Schools Association, and the former president of the Mathematical Association.

== Career ==
Singer married and had children before studying at the university level, and began her university studies in 1971 with a mathematics course at the Open University, in its first class of students. After completing a degree through the Open University, and a Postgraduate Certificate in Education at Garnett College, she became a mathematics teacher at St Paul's Girls' School, and eventually head of mathematics there, before becoming headmistress at Guildford. She retired from Guildford in 2002 and later became a recruitment consultant, leading the schools practice at Saxton Bampfylde.

== Association leadership ==
As president of the Girls' Schools Association, she led calls to replace the General Certificate of Secondary Education examination system by teacher evaluations.

Singer was president of the Mathematical Association for the 2005–2006 term. She is an avid sailor, and her presidential address to the Mathematical Association included mathematical problems associated with sailing as examples of the applicability of mathematics to everyday life, a topic that she felt should be emphasized in mathematical teaching.
