= Sara Melhuish =

British educationist

- Born: 28 April 1861; Oxton
- Died: 23 October 1939 (aged 78); Winchelsea

Sara Melhuish (28 April 1861 – 23 October 1939) was a British educationist known for her leadership at Bedford College's training department.

== Life ==
Melhuish was born in 1861 in Oxton. Her parents were Emily Martha (born Hull) and Charles Melhuish. Her father was a general merchant. In 1886 she was living in Birkenhead and she was attending lectures at University College, Liverpool which was part of the federal Victoria University.

In 1907 she moved to Liverpool to lecture at Liverpool University's training college.

In 1910 Melhuish was appointed as the head of training at Bedford College, London and in the following year A & C Black published her text book English History Illustrated from Original Sources: From the earliest times to 1066 as part of their series of books on history for schools.

Her training department grew to sixty students and four specialist staff. Bedford College was a college for women that had been conferring degrees since 1880 and since 1891 it had begun to train graduate teachers. In 1915 Melhuish was made a reader of the University of London. In 1920 she was sent to Denmark to observe how they were teaching and training girls and young women to see if their ideas could be used in Britain's elementary schools.

Melhuish worked part-time at the Foreign Office during the first World War and during this time her department lost it importance. In 1922 the department was closed and Melhuish retired. Eight years later she became a governor of Bedford College.

Melhuish died in Winchelsea.
