= Marjorie Mayson Killby =

Marjorie Mayson Killby (née Beeton) (1889 – 1981) MBE, was a British nurse who worked as a Vountary Aid Detachment in World War I and worked internationally including developing nurse training in Romania.

== Early life ==
Killby was born on 8 March 1889. She was the eldest daughter of Sir Mayson Beeton and granddaughter of Mrs Isabella Beeton, the cookery writer. She attended Roedean School before moving with her parents to Newfoundland where her father was prospecting for a supply of paper for his print business.

== Education and early career ==
In 1912 she worked as a Voluntary Aid Detachment (VAD) nurse during World War 1 at Marylebone Infirmary. She followed this with further VAD appointments at Paddington Hospital in 1913, St George's Military Hospital in 1914 and Grange Military Hospital in 1915. She then went overseas spending 3 months at the Boulogne Rest Station before moving to the Red Cross Hospital in Rouen until the end of 1916.

She then undertook her nurse training at St Thomas's Hospital completing this in July 1920. This included one year as a student on the first cohort of the Public Health Course organised by the League of Red Cross Societies which led to her forming The Old Internationals’ Association. These post registration international nursing courses took place at Bedford College for Women.

From May to August 1921 she returned to St Thomas's for some obstetric experience. In November 1921 she travelled to Bulgaria with the British Red Cross. In 1924 she took on the role of Officer in Charge International Students in London and inspired the founding of the Old Internationals’ Association.

In 1925 Killby and 5 other nurses went to Bucharest, Romania to train Romanian nurses including time at the Colentina Hospital.

Killby who was Secretary for many years had tried to keep the association going but it became more difficult to maintain close contacts and keep the personal touch of the original organisation. She and her husband hosted Old Internationals at their home informally in 1952.

== Personal life ==
Killby married Leonard Gibbs Killby in 1926 in Chertsey, Surrey who worked for the Empire Cotton Growing Corporation. After the war they lived in Charlbury where Killby contributed to the community in many ways including a life supporter of the St John's Ambulance Brigade, an active member of the Women's Royal Voluntary Service and she set up the Charlbury Meals on Wheels service in 1966. She was an active member of the Charlbury Infant Welfare Centre among others.

== Death ==
She died on 23 November 1981.

== Honours ==
She was awarded Member of the British Empire (MBE) in 1946 for her devoted service to the cause of humanity during World War II.
