= William Sturch =

William Sturch (1753?–1838) was an English Unitarian theological writer.

== Nonconformist background ==
William Sturch came from a long line of General Baptist ministers. His great-grandfather, William Sturch (died 1728), ministered in London. His grandfather, John Sturch, ministered at Crediton, Devon; he published A Compendium of Truths, Exeter, 1731, and a sermon on persecution, 1736. His father, John Sturch, was ordained on 21 June 1753 and ministered to the Pyle Street congregation at Newport, Isle of Wight; he wrote A View of the Isle of Wight, 1778, which passed through several editions, and was translated into German by C. A. Wichman, Leipzig, 1781. He died in 1794. One of his daughters married John Potticary (1763–1820), the first schoolmaster of Benjamin Disraeli.

== Life and family ==
William Sturch was born at Newport about 1753. He became an ironmonger in London, and an original member in 1774 of the Unitarian Essex Street Chapel opened by Theophilus Lindsey. He took the chair at a dinner given in London (5 January 1829) to Henry Montgomery, LL.D., when Charles Butler was one of the speakers.

Sturch died at York Terrace, Regent's Park, on 8 September 1838, aged 85, leaving a widow Elizabeth (died 23 February 1841, aged 81) and family. He was buried in the graveyard of the New Gravel-Pit chapel, Hackney. His second daughter, Elizabeth Jesser, married John Reid and founded Bedford College, London, in October 1849.

== Works ==
In 1799 Sturch published anonymously a short book entitled Apeleutherus; or an Effort to attain Intellectual Freedom. It consists of three essays; the third, ‘On Christianity as a Supernatural Communication,’ exhibiting scepticism in devout mind. A sonnet is prefixed to the work. In 1819 it was reprinted (anonymously), with a dedication to Thomas Belsham, a fourth essay On a Future State, and three additional sonnets. Sturch wrote pamphlets in controversy with conservative Unitarians, and was a frequent contributor to the Monthly Repository. He published also a pamphlet on Catholic emancipation, The Grievances of Ireland: their Causes and their Remedies, 1826.
