= Peter Finch (disambiguation) =

Peter Finch (1916–1977), English-Australian actor of theatre, film, and radio.

Peter Finch may also refer to:

- Peter Finch (poet) (born 1947), Welsh writer
- Peter Finch Martineau (1755–1847), English businessman

== See also ==
- Peter Fincham (born 1956), British television producer and executive
