= Katherine Olmsted =

American nurse and administrator (1888–1964)

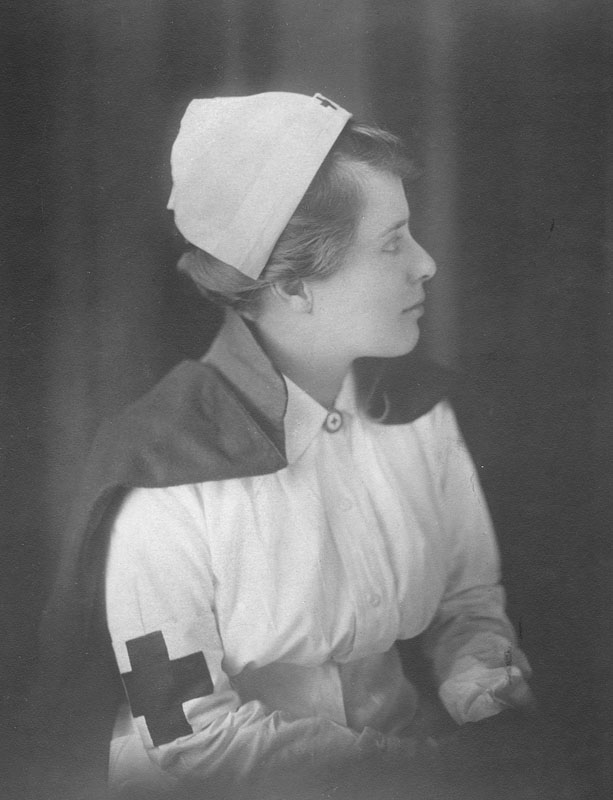
Katherine Olmsted

Katherine Olmsted (February 15, 1888 – April 7, 1964) was an American Red Cross nurse during World War I. She worked along the Eastern Front to fight typhus and study health conditions. She also served as the director of public health nursing with the League of Red Cross Societies, Geneva, Switzerland.

== Early life and career ==
Born on February 15, 1888, in Des Moines, Iowa, Katherine Olmsted was the daughter of Augustus Lowell Olmsted and Emma Jane Lent. She studied at West High School and later obtained a diploma from the Cummings Art School in 1909. She also studied social work at the Chicago School of Civics and Philanthropy. She later continued her higher education at the Johns Hopkins School of Nursing. After graduating in 1912, she began her professional career with the Baltimore instructive visiting nurse association and conducted a survey on blindness. She then joined the social services department of Johns Hopkins Hospital, and subsequently resigned to work with newly enfranchised women in the Anti-Tuberculosis League in Jacksonville, Illinois. In 1916, Olmsted joined the Wisconsin Anti-Tuberculosis Association and became the Wisconsin State Supervisor for public health nursing. She also worked with the extension division of University of Wisconsin to organize the Wisconsin state's first course on public health work for registered nurses.

== World War I ==
During World War I, Olmsted worked with the Red Cross to fight typhus and study health conditions along the Eastern Front. She was in a unit of twelve doctors and twelve nurses who travelled to Romania in August 1917 through the Trans-Siberian Railway. On the Eastern Front, she worked among women and children at an outpatient department in a military hospital. In March 1918, the medical team was trapped between the German Army and the Russian Revolution without any outside contact. After abandoning their mission, they eventually escaped from Russia by train through Siberia and Lapland and reached England in April 1918.

== Return to home ==
After escaping from Russia, Olmsted returned to the United States in the summer of 1918. She then served as the executive secretary of the western office of the National Organization for Public Health Nursing in Baltimore from 1918 to 1920. She was also engaged in public health nursing in rural counties through the Federal Children's Bureau.

== League of Red Cross Societies ==
In 1921, Olmsted became the associate director of the department of nursing of the League of Red Cross Societies. Following the resignation of Alice Fitzgerald, Olmsted was appointed as the director of public health nursing with the League of Red Cross Societies, where she was involved in postwar reconstruction work. She also continued the works of Alice Fitzgerald to create public health nursing organizations worldwide. For the benefits of public health nurses from all over the world, she organized a course in public health nursing at Bedford College, London, and King's College London. Olmsted retired from the Red Cross in 1927.

== Restaurant business ==
At the end of her service in Europe, Olmsted took the Cordon Bleu cooking course at the University of the Sorbonne in Paris, France. Her mother also joined her in Paris. After retirement from the Red Cross in 1927, she returned to the United States. In 1932, she opened a French restaurant, called the Normandy Inn, near her brother's farm at Wallington in Sodus, New York, which she ran for thirty-six years until her death in 1964.

== Death ==
Olmsted died on April 7, 1964, in Sodus, New York.

== Awards and honors ==
Olmsted received numerous medals and awards during her nursing career. Some of these include the Barbee Cross, presented by Queen Marie of Romania; the Russian Freedom medal, presented by Russian Premier Alexander Kerensky; the American Red Cross Service Medal; the Norwegian Red Cross Badge of Honor; the Estonian Badge of the Red Cross Order; the Order of the Belgian Red Cross medal; the Badge of the Serbian Red Cross; the Coronation Medal of Ferdinand I of Romania, presented by Queen Marie; the Merit Cross of the Hungarian Red Cross; and the Italian Red Cross Medal of Merit for Propaganda.
