= Louise Doris Adams =

British mathematics educator and school inspector

L. D. Adams
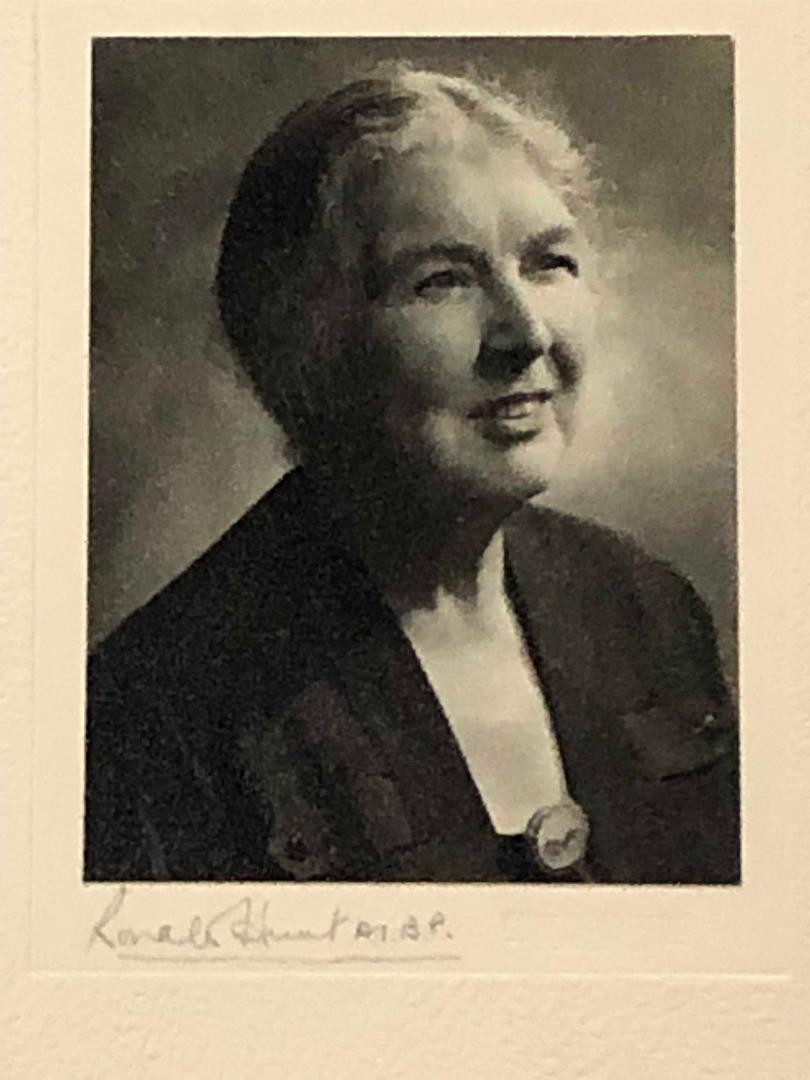
- Born: Louise Doris Adams; 2 July 1889; Gloucester
- Died: 24 December 1965 (aged 76); Worthing
- Education: Bedford College, London
- Scientific career
- Fields: Mathematics

Louise Doris Adams (2 July 1889 – 24 December 1965) was a British mathematics educator and school inspector (HMI) who wrote the 1953 book A Background to Primary School Mathematics (Oxford University Press) and became president of the Mathematical Association for 1959.

== Life ==
Adams earned a degree from Bedford College, London, with second-class honours in mathematics in 1911. Her work as an inspector was centred on the West Country and particularly Bristol; she retired from the inspectorate in 1950.

She joined the Mathematical Association in approximately 1915, and was a member for 51 years; she became a member of the Teaching Sub-Committee of the Mathematical Association in 1946, of which she became Chairman in 1954 and remained a member until her death. She was also a member of the Applications, Arithmetic and Secondary Modern Sub-Committees. When she became president of the Mathematical Association in 1959, she became only the second woman to hold that office since the association's founding in 1871, after Mary Cartwright in 1951, and the second HMI, after W. C. Fletcher in 1939.

She died in 1965.

== Contributions ==
Adams had "considerable experience as a teacher and inspector" and wrote her book, A Background to Primary School Mathematics (1953), on the basis of that experience. It was aimed at teachers of primary-school mathematics, and used case studies from approximately 80 students to advocate linking the teaching of mathematics to the individual experiences of the students. Her book "inspired many teachers" and prefigured a greater emphasis on play with mathematical tools over rote learning.

As a member of the Teaching Sub-Committee of the Mathematical Association, Adams helped shift the association's focus "from teaching to learning" and from what should be taught to how it should be taught, and promoted the inclusion of primary as well as secondary education within the project's scope. Both her book and her presidential address to the Mathematical Association were a major impetus to the reform of mathematical education in the UK, as was the Teaching Sub-Committee's 1955 report The Teaching of Mathematics in Primary Schools, which she was instrumental in writing.
