= Eliza Bostock =

British promoter of women's education

Elizabeth Anne Bostock
- Born: 1817; Liverpool
- Died: 13 April 1898 (aged 80–81); Glamorgan

Elizabeth Anne "Eliza" Bostock (1817 – 13 April 1898) was a British promoter of women's education. She became a trustee at Bedford College after attending lessons there herself. At the time Bedford College was one of the few places where women might receive something approaching university level education. Bedford College was said to be the first British institution run by women and Bostock was the "honorary principal".

== Life ==
Bostock was born in Liverpool in 1817. Her mother was Anne Yates and her father John Bostock was a leading physician. She was educated at home with her father teaching her to speak Italian and the two of them would attend lectures including those by Michael Faraday. In 1829 they moved to France where she learnt French as well and saw the 1830 revolution first hand as a servant negotiated her through barricades.

She returned to British society, but by 1840 she was convinced by Elisabeth Jesser Reid and she wanted to do something about women's education.

Her father died in 1846. Reid was to found Bedford College, London in 1849 and Bostock was a leading supporter. Bedford College School opened in 1853. Bostock attended classes there from the beginning and by 1860 Reid chose her to give her control of the colleges finances as one of the three trustees. Reid had demanded that the governance of the college should include some women. She had agreed with Reid that she would not get married whilst she was a trustee. At the time Bedford College was one of the few places where women might receive something approaching university level education and Bostock was still attending lectures herself in 1863. Reid died in 1866.

There were tough decisions. In order that the staff could concentrate on preparing their students to take university entrance exams then she, Jane Martineau and Eleanor Smith had to close the school that had accompanied the college. The three of them were concerned that Bedford College School was to become Anglican under the head, Francis Martin. The school went on without the trustees' support as the Gower Street School being led, in time, by Lucy Harrison in 1875.

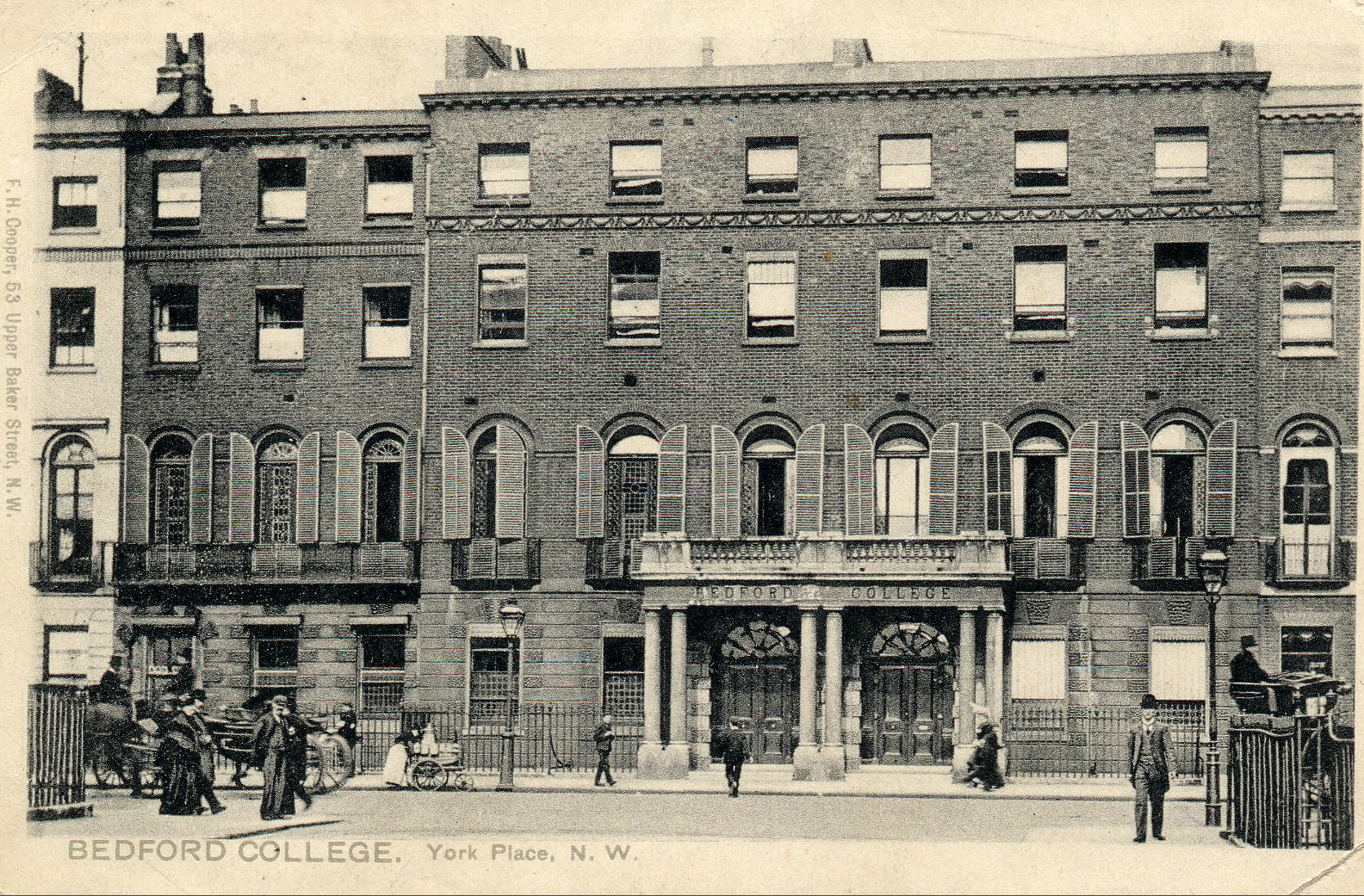
Bedford College in York Place

Cambridge university allowed Bedford students to sit their entrance exams in the 1860s, (although they would not allow women to be given degrees until after WW2). Reid was supplying a lot of the money, but Bostock was paying for some scholarships and offering prizes for academic success.

In 1874, the Bedford Square lease expired and the college moved to 8 and 9 York Place, off Baker Street. Bostock was still a trustee but some saw her as honorary Principal and with her knowledge of building and architecture she organised the college's move to York place.

Bostock died in Glamorgan in 1898. She had been keen to see Bedford College as part of London University and this was achieved in 1900.
