= Violet Maud Evelyn Jones =

Violet Maud Evelyn Jones, Royal Red Cross (RRC), SRN, SCM, (1890-1942) was a Principal Matron in the Queen Alexandra's Imperial Military Nursing Service (QAIMNS) presumed to have been killed when the ship she was on, SS Kuala, was bombed during the evacuation of Singapore in 1942.

== Early life ==
Jones was born on 11 November 1890 in Battersea, London and educated at a local girl's school, and her father was a grocer. Her parents were Thomas and Rebecca Jones. In the 1911 census she was listed as working in her father's post office.

== Education and early career ==
Jones did her nurse training at the Royal Sussex County Hospital and her midwifery training at the Brighton and Hove Hospital for Women, qualifying in 1916. In 1918 she joined the QAIMNS reserve service then transferred to the regular service the following year. She started as a staff nurse and rose up the ranks working in military hospitals in Britain, Egypt, China and India. In 1919 she became a member of the College of Nursing. In 1919 she was one of the first wave of nurses that registered with the General Nursing Council (number 1418). She obtained a scholarship to undertake the one year course for Nurse Administrators and Teachers in Schools of Nursing in the 1927–1928 cohort at Bedford College for Women, the first to obtain a scholarship for the course from the military nursing service. This made her eligible to be part of The Old Internationals' Association (Nursing). In 1939 she had reached the rank of Principal Matron. She was sent to lead the QAIMNS nurses at the British Military Hospital in Singapore in 1940.

== Death ==
Jones died on 14 February 1942, aged 51, when the ship she was on, SS Kuala, was hit by Japanese bombs during the evacuation of Singapore. Three other QAIMNS staff were killed at the same time – Sister Marjorie Aizlewood Hodgson, Sister Margaret Raven Finlay and Matron Helen Montgomery.

== Honours ==
Jones was awarded Royal Red Cross in 1941. This was presented to her niece, Joan Maureen Jones.
