= Robert Baldwin Hayward =

English educator and mathematician (1829–1903)

Robert Baldwin Hayward (7 March 1829 – 2 February 1903) was an English educator and mathematician.

== Life ==
Born on 7 March 1829, at Bocking, Essex, he was son of Robert Hayward by his wife Ann Baldwin; his father, from an old Quaker family, withdrew from the Quaker community on his marriage. Educated at University College, London, he entered St John's College, Cambridge, in 1846, graduating as fourth wrangler in 1850. He was fellow from 30 March 1852 till 27 March 1860, and from 1852 till 1855 assistant tutor.

From 1855 Baldwin was mathematical tutor and reader in natural philosophy at Durham University, leaving in 1859 to become a mathematical master at Harrow School. Hayward remained at Harrow till 1893, a period of 35 years. He reformed mathematics teaching there. He was president (1878–89) of the Association for the Improvement of Geometrical Teaching (afterwards the Mathematical Association).

Hayward was a mountain climber and an original member of the Alpine Club from its foundation in 1858, withdrawing in 1865. He died at Shanklin, Isle of Wight, on 2 February 1903.

== Works ==
- 1884: "Proportional Representation", The Nineteenth Century (February)
- 1895: "Hints on Teaching Arithmetic (pamphlet)

Two of Robert Baldwin Hayward's works are available at Internet Archive:

- 1890: The Elements of Solid Geometry
- 1892: The Algebra of Coplanar Vectors and Trigonometry

In pure mathematics he published papers in the Transactions of the Cambridge Philosophical Society and the Quarterly Journal of Mathematics. He was elected Fellow of the Royal Society on 1 June 1876, in recognition of his work on the method of moving axes.

=== Unified angles ===
Hayward called a hyperbola an excircle in his Algebra of Coplanar Vectors and Trigonomety. Chapter 6 considered "Excircular or hyperbolic trigonometry" where hyperbolic functions are described. He was taken by the analogy of circular sectors and hyperbolic sectors.

Instead of cos u, sin u, etc. as functions of the angle IOp we might regard them as functions of the corresponding sector of the unit-circle, and then regarding cosh v, sinh v, etc. in like manner as functions of the excircular or hyperbolic sector IOP, the analogy between circular and excircular functions is complete.

Introduction of trigonometric ratios by reference to hyperbolc sector area was also advocated by R. Levett and Charles Davison. Such an approach to trigonometry was also taken by Alexander Macfarlane in his essay "Definitions of the Trigonometric Functions".

== Family ==
Hayward married in 1860 Marianne, daughter of Henry Rowe, of Cambridge; his wife's sister married Henry William Watson. He had issue two sons and four daughters, including Sir Maurice Henry Weston Hayward, K.C.S.I., colonial administrator in India.

== Notes ==
Attribution

This article incorporates text from a publication now in the public domain: Lee, Sidney, ed. (1912). "Hayward, Robert Baldwin". Dictionary of National Biography (2nd supplement). Vol. 2. London: Smith, Elder & Co.
