= Elizabeth Williams (educationist) =

British mathematician and educationist

Elizabeth Williams CBE (née Larby, formerly Emily May; 29 January 1895 – 29 March 1986) was a British mathematician and educationist.

== Life ==
Williams was born on 29 January 1895 in Pimlico, London. She studied in Chelsea and Forest Gate during her childhood, and at the age of 16 began attending Bedford College, University of London for a college degree. At Bedford, one of her mentors was Alfred North Whitehead. She became a grammar school teacher, but had to stop teaching when she became married in 1922. Because of this situation, she founded her own school in North London with her husband, and then in 1930 (with the assistance of Percy Nunn, who had been a former tutor) she took a position in education at King's College London.

She became a Commander of the Order of the British Empire in 1958, and president of the Mathematical Association for 1965–1966.

== Works ==
- Oxford Junior Mathematics: Teacher's, Book 5 (1966)
