= Jean Langhorne =

British biologist

- Education: Bedford College, London; Medical Research Council (United Kingdom)
- Scientific career
- Workplaces: Francis Crick Institute; National Institute for Medical Research; National Institute of Allergy and Infectious Diseases; Imperial College London
- Thesis: Studies on antibodies in infectious mononucleosis (1979)

Jean Langhorne is a British biologist who is a group leader at the Francis Crick Institute. Langhorne has studied immune responses to malaria and Plasmodium falciparum. She was awarded the 2016 EMBO-BioMalPar Lifetime Achievement Award for her work on malaria immunology. She is Associate Editor of PLOS Pathogens and on the Advisory Board of Trends in Immunology.

== Early life and education ==
Langhorne completed her undergraduate degree in zoology at Bedford College, London. She moved to the London School of Hygiene and Tropical Medicine for graduate research. Langhorne was a doctoral researcher at the Medical Research Council, where she investigated antibodies in mononucleosis. She was a postdoctoral researcher at Guy's Hospital, where she worked alongside Sydney Cohen. Langhorne joined the Basel Institute for Immunology as a research associate. She was named a Fogarty Fellow at the National Institute of Allergy and Infectious Diseases.

== Research and career ==
Langhorne launched her independent scientific career at the Max Planck Institute of Immunobiology and Epigenetics. She returned to the United Kingdom in 1995, where she joined the faculty at Imperial College London. In 1998, Langhorne joined the National Institute for Medical Research. Her career has focused on understanding and eliminating pathogenic immune responses to malaria. She has investigated how infections are eliminated from blood, and if it is possible to prevent severe malaria by blocking the pathological effects of the body's immune response.

Langhorne has studied children who are constantly exposed to malaria during their childhood in Africa. Whilst some develop immunity to the disease, some are frequently infected. These investigations could help to design new therapeutics or uncover biomarkers for susceptibility.

In recognition of her leadership in malaria researcher, Langhorne was awarded the EMBO-BioMalPar Lifetime Achievement Award in 2016. On being awarded the prize, Langhorne said: "I am not finished yet! I still have a lot that I would like to do,".

== Awards and honours ==
- 2015 Wellcome Trust Senior Investigator Award
- 2016 EMBO-BioMalPar Lifetime Achievement Award
- 2026 elected Fellow of the Royal Society

== Selected publications ==
- Jean Langhorne; Francis M Ndungu; Anne-Marit Sponaas; Kevin Marsh (1 July 2008). "Immunity to malaria: more questions than answers". Nature Immunology. 9 (7): 725–732. doi:10.1038/ni.f.205. ISSN 1529-2908. PMID 18563083. Wikidata Q37194482.
- Morris HR; Paxton T; Dell A; Langhorne J; Berg M; Bordoli RS; Hoyes J; Bateman RH (1 January 1996). "High sensitivity collisionally-activated decomposition tandem mass spectrometry on a novel quadrupole/orthogonal-acceleration time-of-flight mass spectrometer". Rapid Communications in Mass Spectrometry. 10 (8): 889–896. doi:10.1002/(sici)1097-0231(19960610)10:8<889::aid-rcm615>3.0.co;2-f. ISSN 0951-4198. PMID 8777321. Wikidata Q71455987.
- Alister G Craig; Georges E Grau; Chris Janse; et al. (February 2012). "The role of animal models for research on severe malaria". PLOS Pathogens. 8 (2) e1002401. doi:10.1371/journal.ppat.1002401. ISSN 1553-7366. PMC 3271056. PMID 22319438. Wikidata Q27348351.
