= Eleanor Jeanette Merry =

Eleanor Jeanette Merry OBE (SRN, SCM) (died 1982) was a British nurse in the mid-20th century who became Director of the National Council of Nurses.

== Education and early career ==
Merry first trained and worked as a masseuse, and held certificates in electricity, massage and Swedish exercises from the Chartered Society of Massage and Medical Gymnastics. She also held the certificate of the Brompton Hospital for Consumption and Diseases of the Chest. She commenced her nurse training in 1926 at the Nightingale Training School as a relatively older 30 year old. This four year new integrated training course led to a qualification in both hospital and domiciliary nursing in 1929. She then qualified as a midwife the following year.

Merry completed the international public health course run jointly with the Royal College of Nursing and Bedford College with the League of Red Cross Societies in 1931. This made her eligible to be part of The Old Internationals' Association (Nursing). She was awarded a Nightingale scholarship to complete the training and obtained a social certificate and Health Visitor qualification. She then completed her District Nurse training the following year and started working in this role in 1932 in Sussex.

== Career ==
Merry rose through the ranks in District Nursing becoming an assistant Superintendent in Shropshire, and Superintendent in Worcester City. In 1938 she became an Inspector based at the Queen’s Institute Headquarters covering London, Midland and North Western areas. In 1944 Merry formed the education department of the Queen’s Institute. This led to the focus on continuing professional development with courses and refresher days organised for district nurses, tutors and health visitors. Merry received a Boots scholarship to study district nursing in Canada and the United States. In 1949 Merry was the technical advisor for the ‘Friends of the family’ film which depicted the work of Queen’s Nurses in a range of settings with three district nurses starring in the film doing their work.

She became General Superintendent of the Queen’s Institute in 1951 and retired from this position in June 1958.

In 1955 Merry and Dr A.J. Struthers wrote a minority report to the Minister of Health, the Rt Honorable Iain McLeod where they argued for the retention of the 6 month training of State Registered Nurses who wanted to become district nurses. The majority had wanted to reduce this length of training.

In 1956 Merry spent 3 months working as a WHO Nurse Consultant to the Government of Singapore. In retirement she also worked for the Government of British Honduras.

Merry served on many Boards including the Central Midwives Board; Central Health Services Council, Standing Maternity and Midwifery and Standing Nursing Advisory Committees, and National Consultative Committee on the Recruitment of Nurses and Midwives of the Ministry of Health; National Council of Social Service; Nuffield Provincial Hospitals Board; Royal College of Midwives; Health Visitor Representatives Standing Conference; UK Committee for the World Health Organisation; Women’s Voluntary Services and the Ministry of Health Working Party on the Training of District Nurses. She was the Director of the National Council of Nurses, representing them at the International Council of Nurses meeting in Stockholm in 1949.

== Death ==
Merry died on February 23 1982.

== Honours ==
Merry was a Fellow of the Royal Society of Health. Merry was awarded Queen’s Institute gold badge in 1952, and an OBE in 1958.

== Selected works ==
- "District nursing : a handbook for district nurses and for all concerned in the administration of a district nursing service / by Eleanor Jeanette Merry and Iris Dundas Irven". Wellcome Collection.
- Merry, E. J. (1951-09-01). "The Value of the Health Visitor's Work to the Community". Journal of the Royal Sanitary Institute. 71 (5): 559–568. doi:10.1177/175791395107100515. ISSN 0370-7334.
- Merry, E.J. (1955-09-01). "Presidential Address To the Conference of Domiciliary Nurses and Midwives". Journal (Royal Society of Health). 75 (9): 720–721. doi:10.1177/146642405507500918. ISSN 0370-7318. PMID 13273915.
