= Margaret Rayner =

British mathematician (1929–2019)

Margaret Eva Rayner CBE (21 August 1929 – 31 May 2019) was a British mathematician who became vice principal of St Hilda's College, Oxford and president of the Mathematical Association. She was known for her research on isoperimetric inequalities, her work in mathematics education, and her publications on the history of mathematics and of St Hilda's College.

== Early life and education ==
Rayner was born on 21 August 1929 in Tamworth, Staffordshire; her parents were dairy farmers and most of her relatives were also farmers, but an aunt who was a local school headmistress encouraged her in her studies. After study at The King's High School for Girls (graduating as prefect in 1947) she read mathematics at Westfield College with the plan of becoming a mathematics teacher, earned a first, and completed a master's degree there. On the advice of tutor Kathleen Chesney, she applied to be a tutor at St Hilda's College, and was appointed to St Hilda's in 1953, with a joint appointment to St Anne's College, Oxford.

In 1960, she completed a doctorate (D.Phil.) at Oxford; her dissertation was Some problems in unsteady heat flow. At this time she was named a Fellow of St Hilda's.

== Later life and career ==
In the late 1960s and early 1970s she worked on isoperimetric inequalities with American mathematician Lawrence E. Payne, beginning with a 1965 research visit to the University of Maryland and Cornell University, where Payne worked. Their work resulted in the Payne–Rayner inequality, a type of Reverse Hölder inequality for the eigenvalues of the Laplace operator.

In 1980 she was a speaker at the Fourth International Congress on Mathematical Education in Berkeley, California; her talk was entitled Is calculus essential?. Her work in mathematics education also included being chief examiner for the International Baccalaureate, participating in the Secondary Examinations Council and School Examinations and Assessment Council, and working through the Mathematical Association, which she served as president in 1987. She also chaired the board of governors of what is now Oxford Brookes University.

She became vice-principal of St Hilda's in 1981, stepping down in 1988. She retired in 1989. After her retirement, her interests shifted to history, and her publications in this period included a chapter on Oxford mathematics in a book on the history of mathematics, and the book Centenary History of St. Hilda's College (1993).

She died on 31 May 2019 in Oxford.

== Recognition ==
Rayner was named a Commander of the Order of the British Empire in the 1990 Birthday Honours.
