= Elaine Hills-Young =

British nurse

Elaine Hills-Young (1895 - 1983) MBE, DN (Lond), SRN, SCM, was a British nurse.

== Early life ==
Hills-Young was born on 3 February 1895 in Edinburgh to Yorkshire parents. Her father worked as a railway engineer with the London and North-Eastern Railway. She attended the Mary Erskine School for Girls. She was sent to a finishing school in 1912 in the mountains of Prussia. Immediately prior to the start of WW1 in 1914, she made an emergency return home through Petrograd. After the outbreak of WW1 and now back in Scotland, Hills-Young gained her St Andrews Ambulance Association Home Nursing and First Aid certificates and became the first V.A.D. to work at Edinburgh Royal Infirmary. Between 1915 and 1916 Hills-Young was a V.A.D. working with the Scottish Women's' Detachment at an Auxiliary Military Hospital in Cheshire.

== Education and early career ==
Hills-Young did her nurse training at the Nightingale Training School, St Thomas's, London, commencing her training in 1916. She was also a certified midwife. She completed the Mothercraft Training Society (Truby King) course.

In 1922 Hills-Young obtained a post at the Kasr-el-Aini Hospital, Cairo. After two years she returned to the UK to look after her sick father and in 1925 she took up the position of matron at the Victoria Nursing Institution, Ripon. In 1928 she was awarded a Red Cross Scholarship from the League of Red Cross Societies (LRCS) to undertake a course in Hospital Administration at Bedford College, University of London and the College of Nursing, passing all the examinations with distinction. This made her eligible to be part of The Old Internationals' Association (Nursing). The LRCS's Department of Nursing became known as the Nursing Division and then the Nursing Bureau. It was part of the General Medical Department and had a focus on disseminating information about child welfare, tuberculosis, communicable diseases, sanitation, and malaria. The LRCS programme evolved into an internationally recognised programme educating hundreds of nurses from around the world in the interwar years. Nurses who had completed this course called themselves 'Old Internationals'.

In December 1929 Hills-Young took up the position of matron at Wad Medani Hospital, a 200 bed hospital situated 100 miles south of Khartoum in Sudan. She went on to become Principal of the Midwifery Training School, taking over from Mabel Wolff in 1937. She became supervisor of the Sudan Nursing Service; she also organised the establishment of the Red Cross in the Sudan in 1931 and was vice president for 10 years. In 1941 Hills-Young, along with some of her staff, opened a Government Child Welfare Centre in Omdurman near the Midwives Training School.

In 1944 Hills-Young spent the year escorting prisoners of war to and from Sweden. She was among the first nurses to go into Belsen concentration camp while organising the six British Red Cross Mobile Teams sent there. She stayed at Bergen Camp from the time of its initial relief until a British Army Hospital Unit took over. During 1945/48 while matron-in-chief of the British Red Cross Society Civilian Relief Commission in NW Europe she established and staffed several hospitals with Red Cross nurses.

She took on the role of Hon Secretary of the Old Internationals' Association for 13 years, retiring in 1959. The Old Internationals' Association was later renamed the Florence Nightingale International Nurses' Association and was set up for nurses from any country who had successfully completed the Bedford College course.

== Death ==
Hills-Young died on 29 May 1983, aged 88 years in Harpenden. She left £50,820 in her estate.

== Honours ==
1942 - Member of the British Empire (MBE)

Hills-Young was awarded the Africa Star. This was awarded to those who served in North Africa during World War II. To qualify, recipients had to serve for at least one day in an operational area between June 10, 1940 and May 12, 1943.

1967 - Florence Nightingale Medal of the International Committee of the Red Cross in recognition of her work

== Publications ==
Hills-Young E (1940). Charms and customs associated with child-birth. Sudan Notes and Records , Vol. 23, No. 2 (1940), pp. 331-335
