= Jennie Golding =

British mathematician and academic

Jenefer Golding is a British mathematician. She is a professor of mathematics policy and practice at the University College London Institute of Education.

Golding graduated from St Hugh's College, Oxford in 1971 with a degree in mathematics. After spending several years teaching schoolchildren, she moved to UCL, where she focuses on development of mathematics education policy.

In 2016, she served as president of the Mathematical Association, a professional association which is involved in issues of mathematics education in the UK.

In January 2024, she submitted written testimony to the Education Select Committee of the UK Parliament which was published as part of the report called Delivering effective financial education in May of 2024.
