= Anita Straker =

British mathematics educator

Anita Straker CB OBE is a British mathematics educator who became president of the Mathematical Association for the 1986 term.

== Career ==
After teaching maths in schools, Straker became a maths advisor for the county of Wiltshire in the UK and then a school inspector. She went on to pioneer computers in schools from within the UK Department for Education and Employment.

In the 1980s the only primary school software available was American, so she started writing her own programs. She wrote the educational text adventure games Mallory Manor (1983), Merlin's Castle (1984), Zoo (1984), Martello Tower (1986) and Puff (1986) for the BBC Micro.

In the 1990s, she designed the National Numeracy Strategy for primary school children in the UK for which she was honoured with the CB and the OBE.

She has written several maths textbooks.
