= British Military Hospital, Singapore =

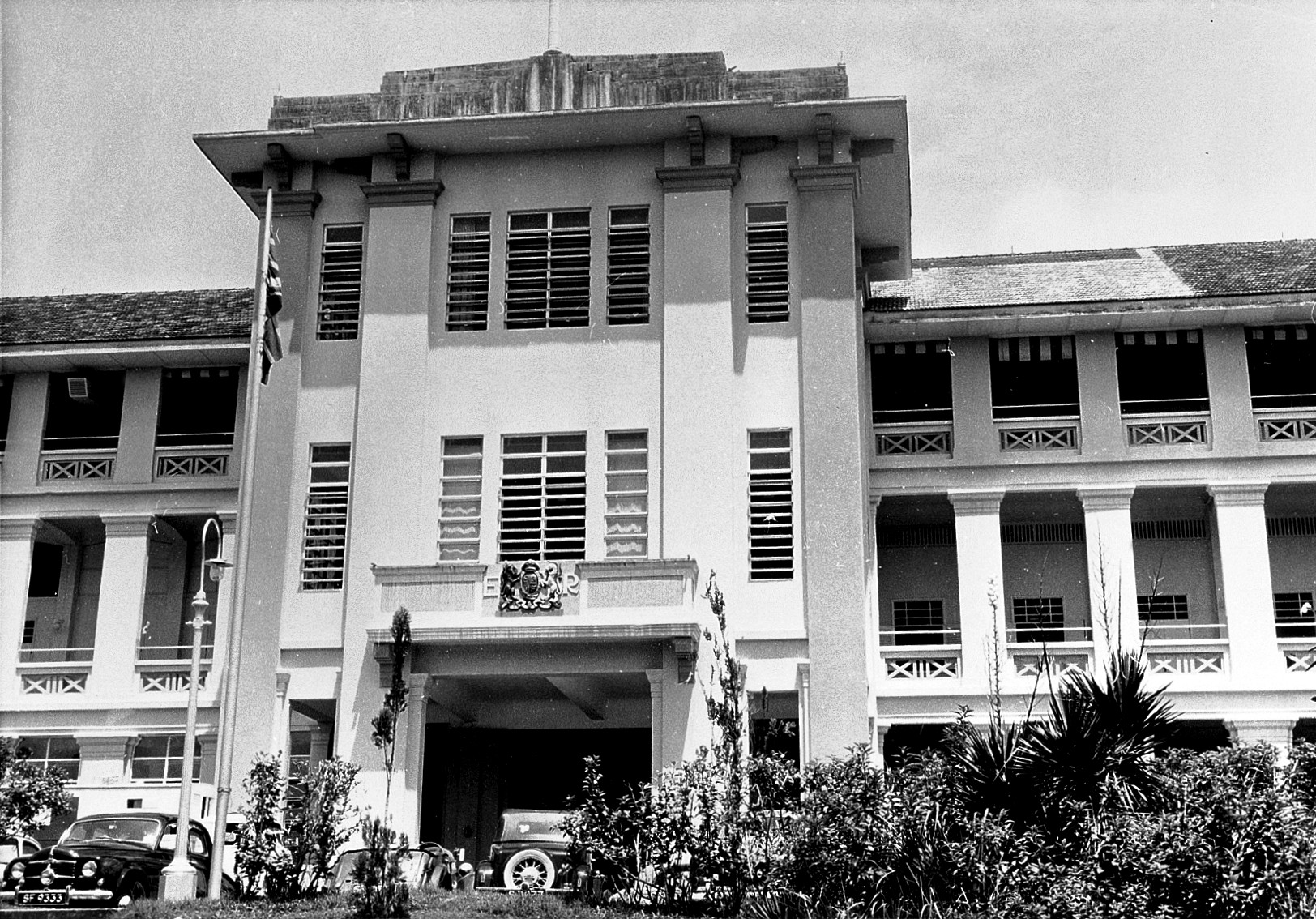
- The British Military Hospital, now Alexandra Hospital

Geography
- Location: 378 Alexandra Road, Singapore
- Coordinates: 1.286824°N 103.801232°E

Organisation
- Type: Military hospital

Services
- Beds: 356

History
- Constructed: 1938; 88 years ago
- Opened: July 1940; 86 years ago
- Closed: 11 September 1971; 55 years ago

Links
- Lists: Hospitals in Singapore

The British Military Hospital, Singapore was the primary military hospital for the British Far East Command in Singapore. It was the site of a massacre in February 1942 by the Imperial Japanese Army (IJA) during the Fall of Singapore.

Established in 1938 and officially opened in July 1940, the facility was located at 378 Alexandra Road, and known as Alexandra Hospital for the nearby park of the same name. After years of planning, the 356-bed hospital opened with some of the best medical facilities in Asia, including then-groundbreaking X-ray equipment.

Six years after Singapore's independence, with the British military withdrawing from the country, the hospital was handed over to the Ministry of Health (MOH) on 11 September 1971 and officially reopened four days later as Alexandra Road General Hospital. At its the height, the hospital adopted cutting-edge medical technology and in 1975 was the first in South East Asia to successfully reattach a patient's limb. Today, Alexandra Hospital is part of the National University of Singapore Medical School.

== Second World War ==
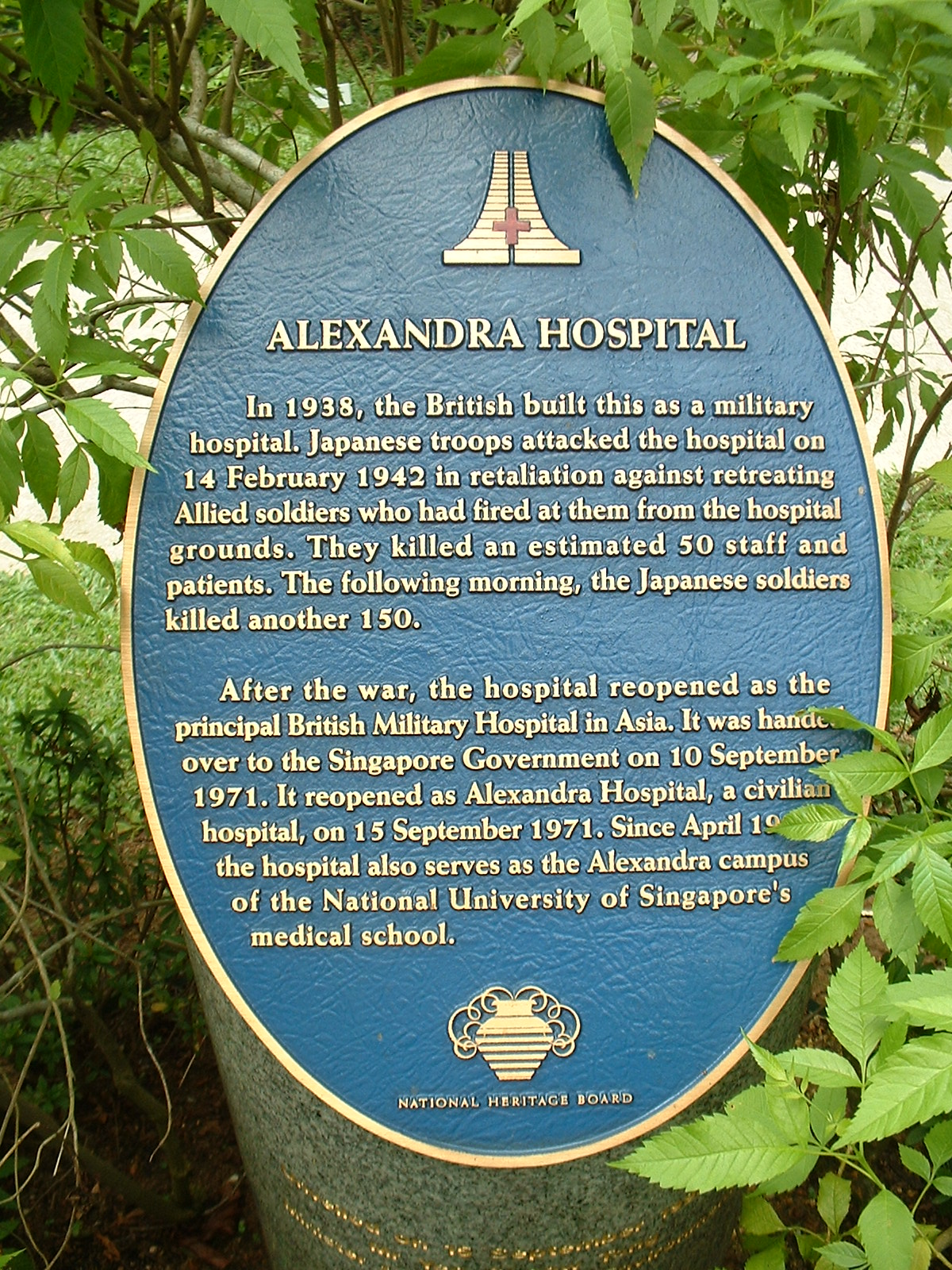
A plaque in the hospital gardens commemorates the massacre and expands on the hospital's history after the war.

On 14 February 1942, the Imperial Japanese Armed Forces advanced through Kent Ridge down Pasir Panjang Road to the Alexandra Military Hospital. The area was a key Japanese objective, containing the British army's biggest ammunition dump and Alexandra Barracks. The British 1st Malaya Infantry Brigade retreated west through the hospital, setting up machine guns on the first and second floors to cover its retreat. A lieutenant wearing a Red Cross brassard and carrying a white flag walked over to the Japanese troops to announce the surrender of non-combatants in the hospital, but was killed immediately. Among the hospital patients were surviving crew members from Force Z, comprising HMS Prince of Wales and HMS Repulse, sunk by Japanese torpedo bombers off the coast of Kuantan, Pahang on 10 December 1941.

Japanese troops of the 18th Division rushed into the hospital wards and operating theatres and bayoneted 250 patients and staff members. Before they could repeat their brutalities in other wards, an officer ordered them to assemble on the hospital grounds outside. The troops removed about 400 patients and staff and locked them up in a small fetid room nearby, where many died of suffocation. The next afternoon, a cell door burst open under the effects of mortar fire and some detainees staggered out and were killed by Japanese machine-gun fire. Those who escaped are thought to include Privates S.W.J. Hoskins and F.A.H. Gurd, Captain R. de Warrenne Waller, and Medical Corporal G.W. Johnson. Other survivors were taken from their cells in small groups and shot by the Japanese. The bodies were buried in a mass grave. The Japanese claimed that some Indian troops had fired on them from the hospital grounds.

Walter Salmon of the Royal Signals, wounded by mortar fire, had been taken to the top floor of Alexandra Hospital, then had gone to the canteen, where he witnessed part of the massacre. Several men, including Private George Britton of the East Surrey Regiment, had been moved from the upstairs ward to the dining room and were in makeshift beds under the dining table. Britton later described how the Japanese rushed in, taking all the bread piled on the table. But although an orderly was marched out and bayoneted, those on the floor were ignored. They were left in the hospital for three days without food or water before being moved to the Changi POW camp on wheelbarrows, carts, or anything with wheels, as no motorised vehicles were available.

Other surviving staff and patients of the hospital were eventually transferred to the Roberts Barracks, where their command was taken over by Colonel Glyn White of the Royal Australian Army Medical Corps. While a handful of people survived the Alexandra Hospital massacre, the number remains unclear. Survivors included George Britton, Walter Salmon, Fred Shenstone, Arthur Haines, Fergus Anckorn, and perhaps those who managed to escape their cell under mortar fire, S.W.J. Hoskins, F.A.H. Gurd, R. de Warrenne Waller and G.W. Johnson. In a Forces TV news interview, Fergus Anckorn mistakenly claimed to be the only survivor.

The Principal Matron of the Queen Alexandra’s Imperial Military Nursing Service (QAIMNS), Violet Maud Evelyn Jones, Royal Red Cross, SRN, SCM, was in charge of the nursing staff at the British Military Hospital Singapore from 1940 to 1942. She organised the evacuation of nursing staff the day before the massacre on board three ships. Jones, together with about 500 adults and children, was evacuated aboard the SS Kuala. On 14 February 1942 the Japanese air force bombed the ship and Jones and many others were killed including Sister Marjorie Aizlewood Hodgson, Sister Margaret Raven Finlay and Matron Helen Montgomery.

In 2008, a four-page account of the massacre, by Private Haines of the Wiltshire Regiment, was sold in a private auction. Reg Twigg, in his book Survivor on the River Kwai mentions a short video recording made by another survivor of the massacre, Fred Shenstone of the Royal Leicestershire Regiment, which forms part of a permanent exhibit of the Royal Leicestershire Regiment Museum housed in the Newarke Houses Museum in Leicester, United Kingdom.

== Post-war period ==
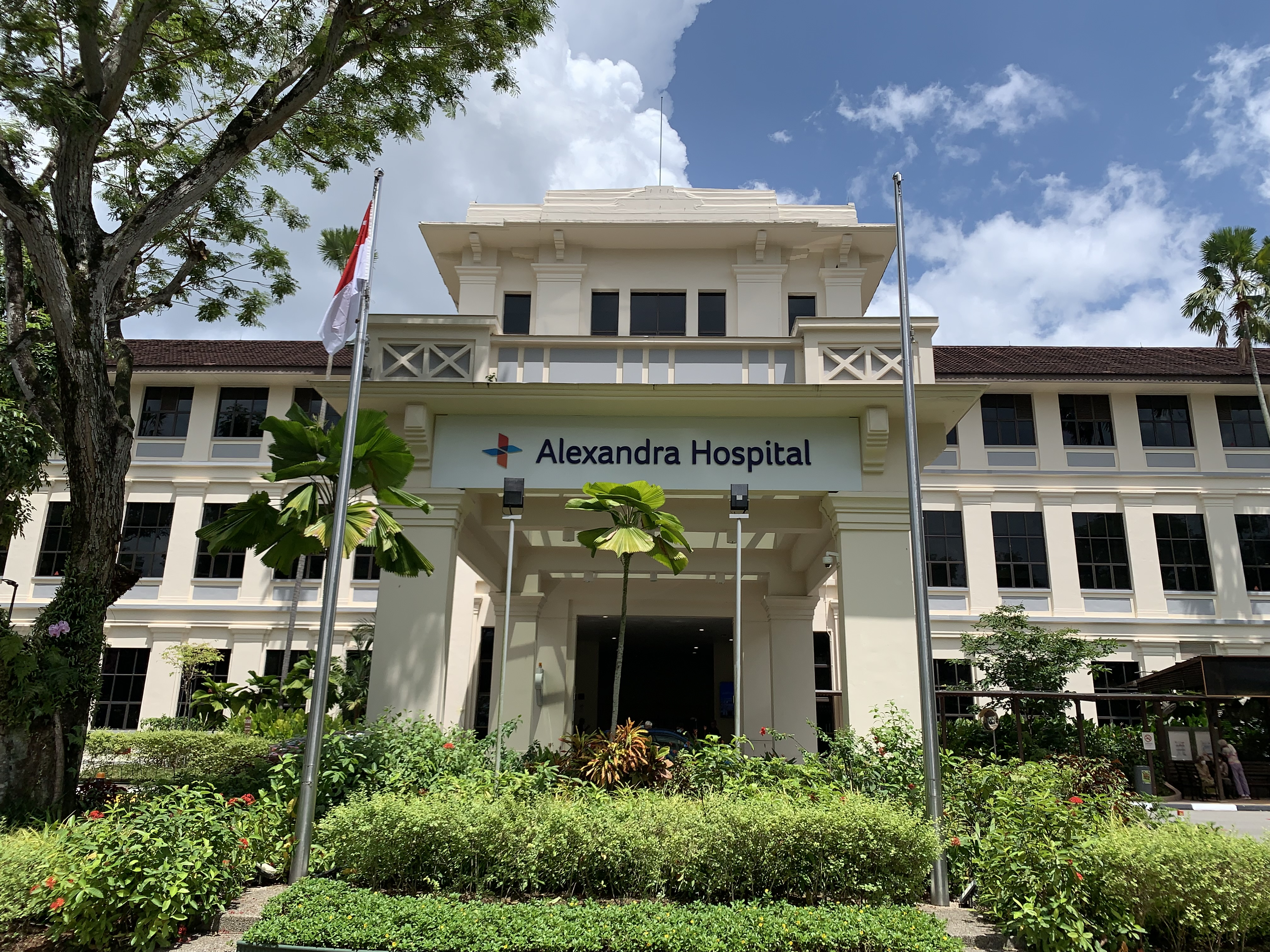
Alexandra Hospital in 2025.

After the Japanese surrender in 1945, a book containing the names of those massacred by the Japanese was kept in the hospital. Its current whereabouts are unknown.

After World War II and into the 1970s, the Alexandra Hospital remained one of the most modern in Singapore, and it is now a part of the National University of Singapore Medical School.

== Notable staff ==
The Alexandra Hospital is also known for some of the renowned medical experts it has employed, including:

- Sir Roy Calne, an international renowned transplant surgeon
- Sir David Weatherall, Regius professor of medicine and honorary director of the Weatherall Institute of Molecular Medicine at Oxford University

== Sources ==
- Partridge, Jeff, Alexandra Hospital: From British Military to Civilian Institution, 1938–1998, Alexandra Hospital and Singapore Polytechnic, 1998 ISBN 981-04-0430-1
- Lim, Patricia Pui Huen, Wong, Diana, War and Memory in Malaysia and Singapore, Institute of Southeast Asian Studies, 2000
- Faucher, Carole, As the wind blows and dew comes down: Ghost stories and collective memory in Singapore, in Beyond Description: Singapore Space Historicity, Ryan Bishop, John Phillips, Wei-Wei Yeo, Routledge, Singapore, 2004
- Sagar Coulter, Jack Leonard, The Royal Naval Medical Service, Her Majesty's Stationery Office, 1954
- Khoo, Fun Yong, X-rays in Singapore, 1896–1975, National University of Singapore Press, 1981
- Harrison, Mark, Medicine and Victory: British Military Medicine in the Second World War, Oxford University Press, 2004
- Owen, Frank, The Fall of Singapore, M. Joseph Publisher, 1960
- Middlebrook, Martin, Mahoney, Patrick, Battleship: The Loss of the Prince of Wales and the Repulse, Allen Lane, 1977
- Thompson, Chuck, The 25 Best World War II Sites: Pacific Theater, AS Davis Media Group, 2002
- Fernandez, George J., Successful Singapore: A Tiny Nation's Saga from Founder to Accomplisher, SSMB Pub. Division, 1992
- Barber, Noel, Sinister Twilight: The Fall and Rise Again of Singapore, Collins, 1968
