= Marshalls (house) =

Coordinates: 51.5843°N 0.1792°E

Marshalls was a house, located in Romford in the historic parish and Royal liberty of Havering, whose former area today forms the north eastern extremity of Greater London, England. The name Marshalls dates back to 1213 when Gilbert, son of Roger Marschal is recorded as leasing land in Havering to the house of Canons at St Bernard, and in 1321 Richard le Marescall owned land near the eventual site of the house. Marshalls was situated roughly where the playground of the current St Edwards' C of E Primary school is now, and at its greatest the surrounding estate was approximately bounded by the modern roads of Main Road, North Street, Pettits Lane, and Pettits Boulevard.

== Buildings ==
There is no record of any particularly grand or notable property associated with Marshalls. By about 1610 it was described as a messuage with 40 acres and was still described as “that messuage or tenement commonly called or known by the name Marshalls” in 1746. The house was considerably improved by Jackson Barwis, the High Sheriff of Essex, who lived there until his death in 1809. It is essentially this house that Pevsner in his book on Essex describes as having a "stuccoed Georgian five-bay front (Tuscan porch) and gabled back parts", while the sale catalogue from 1816 describes it as “A plain neat edifice, brick, extremely well erected...(with)...a portico entrance to the principal or ground storey....”. The house was demolished in 1959 as it was “not of historical or architectural value”.

== Owners and tenants ==
As described above, Gilbert Marschal leased land in Havering to the Augustinian Canons of the Hospice of St Bernard in Switzerland, of which nearby Hornchurch Priory was a dependency. The land continued in the family into the 14th Century and then passed to the Carew family. Edward Carew son of John Carew, the deputy Steward of the Royal Library of Havering, is recorded as a past owner in 1610; at this date the property belonged to a “gentleman named Thorowgood”, probably George Thorowgood who owned Hornchurch Hall. On 20 January 1694 Simon Thorowgood leased Marshalls to Thomas Scawen, but then sold the property to Russell Alsopp in 1704. When Alsopp died he owed much money to Sir William Scawen, Governor of the Bank of England from 1697 to 1699 and there followed a lengthy legal argument over ownership of the property.

In 1748 Marshalls passed from John Leigh to Mary Frost, and later passed to Jackson Barwis who was High Sheriff of Essex for 1796, the property remaining in the possession of his widow until her death on 24 December 1815. The house was then bought by local banker Rowland Stephenson of the bank Remington, Stephenson & Company in 1816. During his time Marshalls was described as ‘Princely’, but Stephenson, MP for Leominster had embezzled the bank of nearly half a million pounds and in 1828 he fled the country. Marshalls was then bought by Hugh McIntosh, who also owned the Manor of Havering and passed to his nephew David McIntosh who lived there until 1850 when he moved to the newly built mansion in Havering Park, although he had been letting Marshalls for some years.

In 1855 the young Octavia Hill visited the family of Daniel Harrison who were living there by then. She brought some of the poor children she had been teaching in London, to give them a taste of the countryside with which they were so unfamiliar. A number of Hill's published letters are addressed from 'Marshals'[sic].
