= James Macdonell (journalist) =

Scottish journalist (1841–1879)

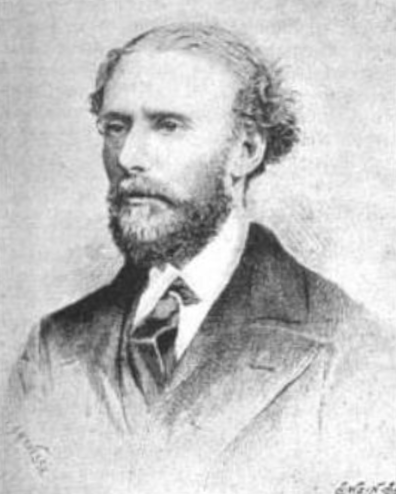
- Born: 1841; Dyce, Scotland
- Died: 2 March 1879 (aged 37–38); London, England
- Occupation: Journalist

James Macdonell (1841 – 2 March 1879) was a Scottish journalist.

== Life ==
Macdonell was born at Dyce near Aberdeen. In 1858, after his father's death, he became clerk in a merchant's office. He began writing in the Aberdeen Free Press; in 1862 he was appointed to the staff of the Daily Review in Edinburgh, and at 22 he became editor of the Northern Daily Express.

In 1865 Macdonell went to London with a staff position on the Daily Telegraph, which he held until 1875, as special correspondent in France in 1870 and 1871. In 1873 he became a leader-writer on The Times. He died in London on 2 March 1879. His posthumous France since the First Empire, though incomplete, gave insights into the French politics of his time.
