= Jane Martineau (college administrator) =

College administrator (1812–1882)

- Born: 1812
- Died: 2 January 1882 (aged 69–70)
- Occupation: College administrator
- Organization: Bedford College, London

Jane Martineau (1812 – 2 January 1882) was a British college administrator, and the founding administrator of Bedford College, London.

== Life ==
Jane Martineau was born in London, the first child of seven born to sugar refiner and mechanical engineer John Martineau (1789–1832), and Jane (née Taylor; 1792–1868). She was educated in Stratford upon Avon. In 1831, the family emigrated to America, but returned following John Martineau's death at sea. From a close family, Jane continued living with her other unmarried sisters long after the death of their mother.

Between 1849 and 1855, Martineau registered to study at Bedford College, taking classes in astronomy, drawing, English, geography, mathematics, moral philosophy, and political economy. The college had been founded by Elizabeth Jesser Reid, a friend and - like Jane - a Unitarian. Her skills in administration were sharpened by lessons in bookkeeping, helping her to manage her family's accounts.

Martineau was part of Bedford College from its establishment in 1849. She acted as one of the college's "Lady Visitors", chaperoning students and helping to run the college. Martineau represented the Lady Visitors on the council 1852–1855, and in 1855 she was appointed honorary secretary. She retained this post until her retirement in 1876. Like her other work for the college, this was always unpaid.

In 1860, Reid made Jane Martineau a trustee, increasing her power within the college, and giving her control over two trust funds established by Reid for the college's boarding house and to provide for women's education. After Reid's death, Martineau and her fellow trustees took control of Bedford College. With one of these, Eliza Bostock, Martineau brought about the closure of the college's attached school, so as to focus on higher education for women.

Jane Martineau was recognized as a capable and meticulous administrator, who also gave significant time to ensuring students' academic success. As Sophie Badham wrote in her entry for the Oxford Dictionary of National Biography, Martineau "devoted her life to the cause of women's education". She was a signatory on the 1866 suffrage petition.

She died at her home in Hyde Park, London, on 2 January 1882.
