= Elizabeth Jesser Reid =

British philanthropist

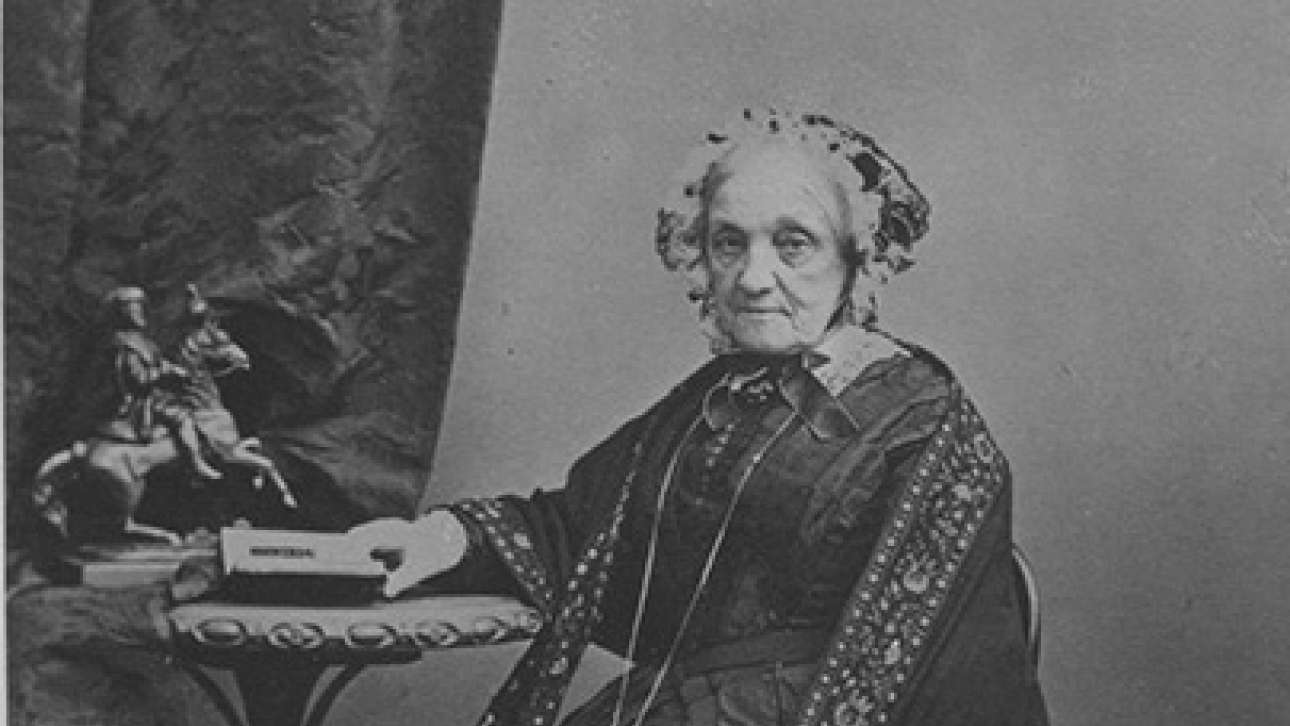
- Born: Elizabeth Jesser Sturch; 25 December 1789; London, England
- Died: 1 April 1866 (aged 76); London, England
- Other names: Elisabeth Jesser Sturch
- Occupation: Philanthropist
- Known for: founder of Bedford College
- Spouse: John Reid

Elizabeth Jesser Reid (/riːd/; née Sturch; 25 December 1789 – 1 April 1866), forename sometimes spelled Elisabeth, was an English social reformer, anti-slavery activist, and philanthropist. She is best remembered as the founder of Bedford College.

== Biography ==
=== Early life ===
Elisabeth Jesser Sturch was born on 25 December 1789 in London. Her father, William Sturch, was a wealthy Unitarian ironmonger.

In 1821, she married Dr John Reid. Dr Reid had inherited land in Northumbria and on the River Clyde at Glasgow that had become valuable as the port grew in size. His death in July 1822 gave her an independent income, which she used to help various philanthropic causes.

=== Activism ===
Active in liberal Unitarian circles, Reid was an anti-slavery activist, attending the World Anti-Slavery Convention in London in 1840. She met Lucretia Mott and the other American female delegates who had been denied the right to speak at the convention. and taking a close interest in the American Civil War. She was also in contact with leading figures in the revolutions in France and Germany in 1848, and the struggles for Italian independence.

=== Women's higher education ===
In 1849, Reid founded Bedford College at 47 Bedford Square in the Bloomsbury area of London. The college was a women-only higher education institution that aimed to provide a liberal and non-sectarian education for female students – something no other institution in the United Kingdom offered at the time. Bedford College played a leading role in the advancement of women in higher education, and in public life in general. The National Archives U.K. holds a number of letters written to Reid that reference noted Victorian advocates of female education, including Harriet Martineau and Frances Lupton. Reid also founded the Reid Trust, which continues to support women's education with small grants to this day.

Reid died in 1866, leaving her remaining wealth in a trust fund for the college. Reid had insisted on women being involved with the governance of the college and there were three women trustees including her friend Elizabeth Anne Bostock, educationalist Eleanor Smith and Jane Martineau.

== Legacy ==
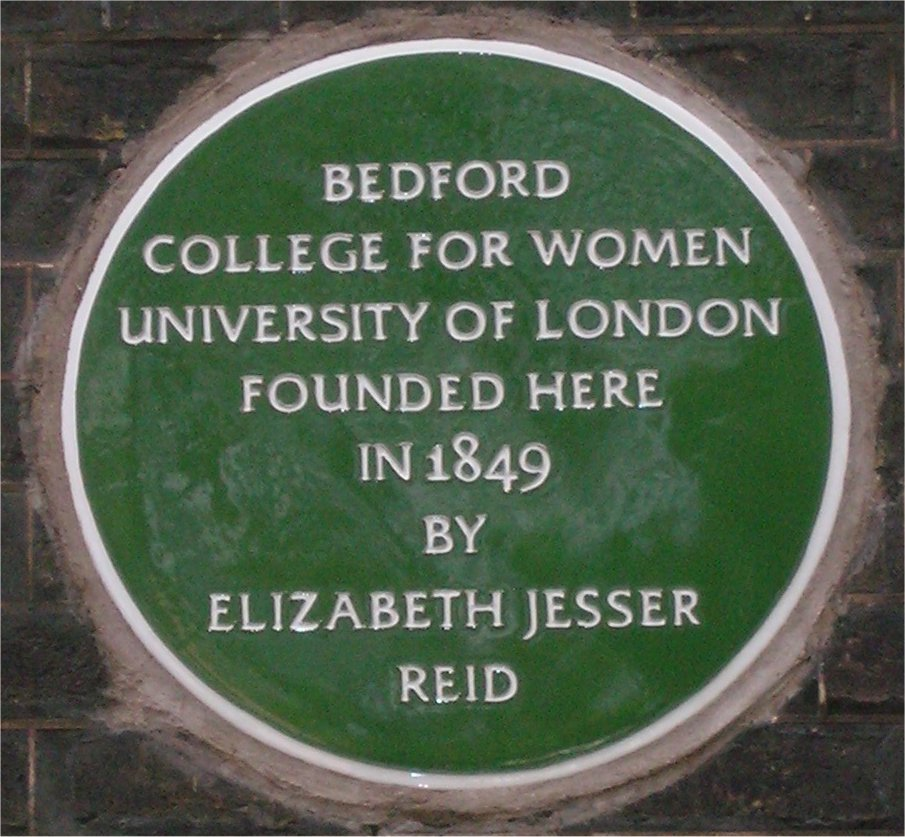
Green plaque at Bedford Square, London

There is a green plaque on Reid's house in Bedford Square.

Bedford College became a college of the University of London in 1900, and merged with Royal Holloway College in 1985 to become Royal Holloway and Bedford New College. One of the halls of residence on the current campus is named "Reid Hall" in memory of the Bedford College founder.

Her letters are held at The Royal Holloway Archives.

Academic offices
Preceded by None	Founder; Bedford College; University of London; 1849–64	Succeeded by Dame Emily Penrose
