= Edith Helen Paull =

Indian nurse

- Born: 14 January 1902; Chunar, British India
- Died: 1975 (aged 73)
- Occupation: Medical nurse
- Awards: Padma Shri; Florence Nightingale Medal

Edith Helen Paull (14 January 1902 – 1975) was an Indian medical nurse from Uttar Pradesh associated with the Indian Red Cross Society.

== Life ==
She did her nursing studies at Bedford College, London, with the assistance of a Florence Nightingale scholarship and started her career in 1928. She held the post of the nursing matron at many renowned medical institutions such as the Lady Hardinge Medical College Hospital, New Delhi, the Government Civil Hospital, Allahabad, Gokuldas Tejpal Hospital, Mumbai and Jehangir Hospital, Pune and presided The Trained Nurses' Association of India for six years. A winner of the Florence Nightingale Medal in 1964, she was honoured by the Government of India in 1967, with the award of Padma Shri, the fourth-highest Indian civilian award for her contributions to the society.
