= Alice Fitzgerald =

American nurse (1875–1962)

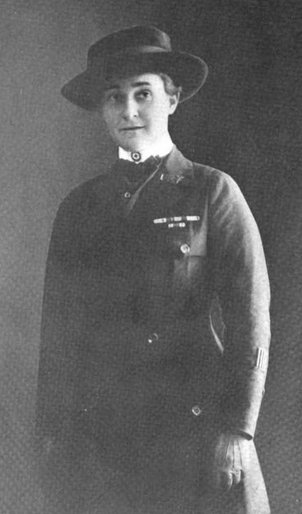
- Fitzgerald in uniform, from a 1920 publication
- Born: Alice Louise Florence Fitzgerald; March 13, 1875; Florence, Italy
- Died: November 10, 1962 (aged 87); New York City
- Education: Johns Hopkins Hospital School of Nursing
- Occupation: registered nurse
- Years active: 1908-1948
- Known for: Leadership in nursing, in Europe during and after World War I, and in Asia in the 1920s

Alice Louise Florence Fitzgerald ARRC (March 13, 1875 — November 10, 1962) was an American nurse who served in Europe during and after World War I. She earned a Florence Nightingale Medal from the International Committee of the Red Cross in 1927, for her achievements.

== Early life ==
On March 13, 1875, Fitzgerald was born as Alice Louise Florence Fitzgerald in Florence, Italy. Fitzgerald's American parents were Charles H. Fitzgerald and Alice Riggs Lawrdson, both from Baltimore.

== Education ==
Fitzgerald studied in Europe before attending Johns Hopkins School of Nursing, graduating in the class of 1906. The several languages she learned in a European childhood would prove useful in her adult work. Fitzgerald was fluent in English, French, German, and Italian.

== Career ==
Fitzgerald returned to Italy in 1908 to assist the Italian Red Cross in the aftermath of an earthquake in Messina, volunteer work for which she received the Italian Red Cross Disaster Relief Medal. She was head nurse at Johns Hopkins Hospital from 1909 to 1910, at Bellevue Hospital from 1910 to 1912, with further supervisory posts in Wilkes-Barre, Pennsylvania, Indianapolis, and Wellesley, Massachusetts.

During World War I, she was named the first "Edith Cavell Memorial nurse" from Massachusetts, funded to work with the British Queen Alexandra Imperial Military Nursing Service at Boulogne and Méaulte from 1916 to 1917, and then with the American Red Cross. Outside France, she served at a refugee hospital in Rimini. Her postwar work included organizing nursing schools, recruiting bilingual nurses, serving as Chief Nurse of the American Red Cross in Europe, and as Director of the Nursing Bureau of the League of Red Cross Societies in Geneva. She founded the International School for Public Health Nurses. For her efforts, Fitzgerald was awarded medals and honors by Great Britain (Royal Red Cross second class), France (Medaille d'honneur and other decorations), Italy, Poland, Serbia, Hungary, and Russia.

She worked in Asia in the 1920s, advising the Governor General of the Philippines on public health nursing, and founding a nursing program at Baguio. She did further earthquake relief in Japan after the 1923 Great Kantō earthquake. She started a nursing school in Bangkok in 1924, and studied nursing programs in Thailand, Hong Kong, Singapore, and China. In 1927, she was awarded the Florence Nightingale Medal by the International Committee of the Red Cross.

Back in the United States, she was director of nurses at Polyclinic Hospital in New York (from 1930 to 1936), and a housemother at Sheppard and Enoch Pratt Hospital in the 1940s.

Fitzgerald retired in 1948.

== Personal life ==
Fitzgerald died in 1962, at Peabody Nursing Home in New York City, New York. Fitzgerald was 87 years old.

=== Legacy ===
Fitzgerald's papers, including diaries, photographs, and medals, are archived at Johns Hopkins, with another collection of her papers, including an unpublished memoir, at the Maryland Historical Society. A biography for young readers, Nurse Around the World: Alice Fitzgerald by Iris Noble, was published in 1967.

== Awards and decorations ==
- Florence Nightingale Medal
- French Honour medal for courage and devotion
- Medal of French Gratitude
- Silver Medal of the Polish Red Cross
- Serbian Red Cross medal
- Italian Red Cross Disaster Relief medal
- Russian Red Cross medal
- British Royal Red Cross medal
- British Campaign medal
- British Victory medal
