= Bedford College, London =

Former college in London founded as a women's college

Coordinates: 51.518545°N 0.129481°W

Bedford College
- University of London
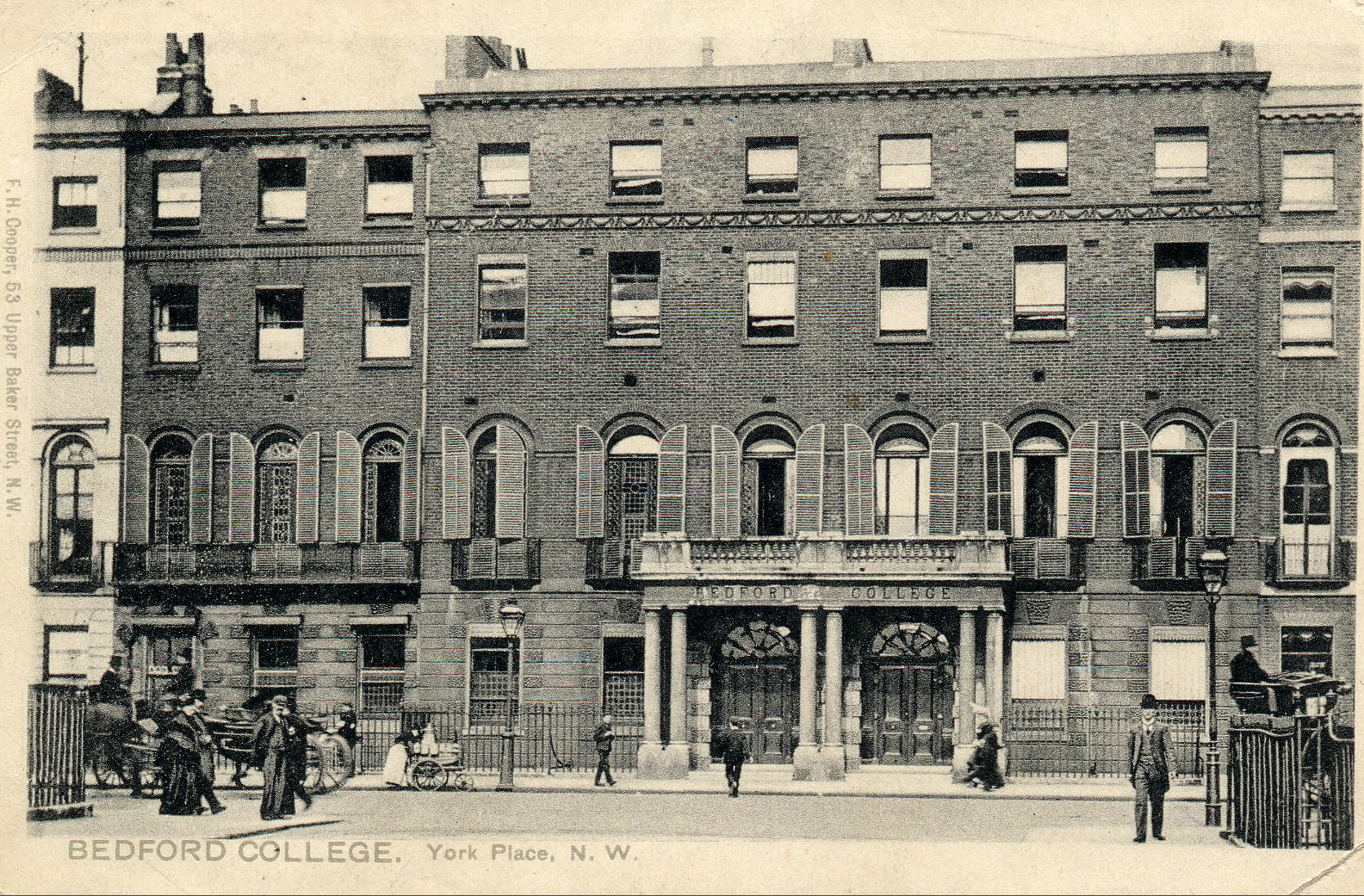
- Bedford College was in York Place after 1874.

- Coat of arms
- Latin name: Collegium Bedfordiense
- Founder: Elizabeth Jesser Reid
- Founded: 1849
- Closed: 1985

Bedford College was founded in London in 1849 as the first higher education college for women in the United Kingdom. In 1900, it became a constituent of the University of London. Having played a leading role in the advancement of women in higher education and public life in general, it became fully coeducational (i.e. open to men) in the 1960s. In 1985, Bedford College merged with Royal Holloway College, another constituent of the University of London, to form Royal Holloway and Bedford New College. This remains the official name, but it is commonly called Royal Holloway, University of London (RHUL).

== History ==
=== Foundation ===
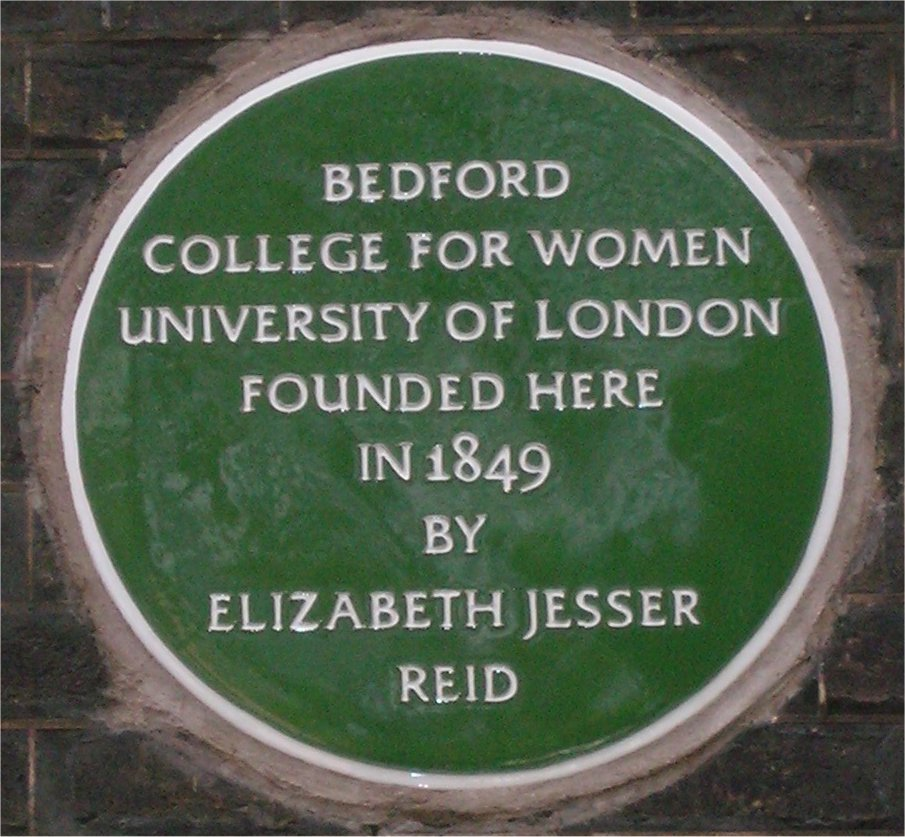
Green plaque at Bedford Square, London

The college was founded by Elizabeth Jesser Reid (née Sturch) in 1849, a social reformer and anti-slavery activist, who had been left a private income by her late husband, Dr John Reid, which she used to patronise various philanthropic causes. Mrs Reid and her circle of well-educated friends believed firmly in the need to improve education for women. She leased a house at 47 Bedford Square in the Bloomsbury area of London and opened the Ladies College in Bedford Square. The intention was to provide a liberal, non-sectarian education for women, something no other institution in the United Kingdom provided at the time. Reid placed £1,500 (GBP) with three male trustees and persuaded a number of her friends to serve on the management committees and act as teaching professors. In their first term they had 68 pupils.

Initially the governance of the college was in the hands of the Ladies Committee (comprising some influential women) and the General Committee made up of the Ladies, the professors of the college and three trustees. It was the first British institution partly directed by women. The General Committee (later the council) soon took over the running of the college, while the Ladies Committee directed the work of the Lady Visitors, who were responsible for the welfare and discipline of the students, and acted as their chaperones. Initially the professors were shocked by the generally low educational standards of the women entering the college, who in most cases had only home-based governess education. In response, Reid founded Bedford College School close to the college in 1853, in an attempt to provide a better standard of entrants. In 1860, the college expanded into 48 Bedford Square, which enabled it to become a residential establishment. "The Residence" was in the charge of a matron, who introduced the practice of students help to run the house and keep their own accounts.

=== Succession ===
Elizabeth Reid died in 1866 and left a trust fund and the leases of the college's buildings in the hands of three female trustees Eliza Bostock, Jane Martineau and Eleanor Smith. The three of them were concerned that Bedford College School was to become Anglican under the head, Francis Martin. They closed the school although the idea went on without the trustees support as the Gower Street School being led, in time, by Lucy Harrison in 1875.

The trustees insisted on a new constitution (as the college had no legal charter at the time). The council was replaced by a committee of management and the college reconstituted as an association under the Board of Trade and officially became known as Bedford College.

In 1874, the Bedford Square lease expired and the college moved to 8 and 9 York Place, off Baker Street. Eliza Bostock was still a trustee but many looked to her as honorary principal and with her knowledge of building and architecture she organised the college's move to York place. The two houses, 8 and 9, acted as one, with the college using the downstairs rooms and the upstairs being the Residence. As numbers began to rise, the college expanded by adding extensions to house science laboratories. In the late 1870s, an entrance examination was introduced and a preparatory department set up for those who did not meet the standards required for college-level entry.

=== Women with degrees ===
In 1878, degree examinations of the University of London were opened to women. Bedford College students began gaining University of London Bachelor of Arts, Bachelor of Science and Master's degrees from the early 1880s. In 1891 the college began training women graduates to teach secondary students. In 1910 Sara Melhuish was appointed as the head of training and within five years there were sixty students and four specialist staff.

In 1900, the University of London became a teaching university (before, it had only awarded university degrees); Bedford College became one of its constituent colleges. It applied to the Privy Council for a royal charter to take the place of its deed of incorporation. Royal assent for the university charter was received in 1909, and the college became officially recognised as Bedford College for Women.

Continued growth led to a search for new premises, leading to the purchase of the lease on a site at Regent's Park in 1908. A major fund-raising effort was undertaken to provide it with modern amenities. The purpose-built buildings were designed by the architect Basil Champneys and officially opened by Queen Mary in 1913. The buildings continued to be extended and rebuilt throughout the 70 years that the college spent at Regent's Park, especially after extensive damage from wartime bombing.

Bedford College partnered with the League of Red Cross Societies and the College of Nursing in 1921 to develop one of the first courses in postgraduate education for nurses. This followed a one year programme at King’s College. The first course offered to a group of 20 international nursing students was public health. The courses continued until the outbreak of World War II in 1939. Those who completed the course formed The Old Internationals' Association.

The college colours were green and grey, said to be those of Minerva. Purple was added in 1938 to represent the university; the resulting colours were, by chance or design, similar to those of women's suffrage in the United Kingdom.

A permanent record of the pictorial history of the college was made following the final reunion of former students and the collection and cataloguing of the archives in 1985.

Bedford firsts include:

- First women to run a British institution.
- First Social Sciences department in the UK, established 1918
- First woman to hold a chair in philosophy in the UK, Susan Stebbing.
- One of the first two women fellows of the Royal Society
- Fourth woman chairman of the Trades Union Congress (TUC), Marie Patterson
- The first art school in England where women could draw from life

After a brief period of admitting a small number of male postgraduate students, the college became fully coeducational when 47 men passed through clearing in 1965, and the name reverted to Bedford College.

In the early 1980s, Bedford College had approximately 1,700 students and 200 academic staff based in 20 departments.

=== Merger with Royal Holloway ===
In 1985, Bedford College merged with Royal Holloway College, another college of the University of London which, like Bedford College, had been a college only for women when first founded. The merged institution took Royal Holloway College's premises in Egham, Surrey, just outside London, as its main campus and took on the name of Royal Holloway and Bedford New College (RHBNC). The decision to drop the Bedford name from day-to-day use caused some discontent among graduates of Bedford College, who felt that their old college had now essentially been taken over by Royal Holloway, and that Bedford College's name and history as a pioneering institution in the field of women's education were being forgotten. To give more prominence to the Bedford name, the merged college named a large, newly built library in the centre of its campus the "Bedford Library". Relations between RHUL and some of the Bedford College alumni remain somewhat strained, but many other Bedford College alumni maintain links with RHUL, supporting alumni events and other college work.

Bedford College's old premises in Regent's Park is now the home of Regent's University London.

== Notable alumni ==
- Louise Doris Adams (died 1965), president of the Mathematical Association
- Mary Bridges-Adams (1854–1939), English educationalist
- Shahidul Alam (born 1955), Bangladeshi photographer, writer and curator
- Chris Aldridge, English BBC Radio 4 newsreader
- Ajahn Amaro (born 1956), Theravadin Buddhist monk, and abbot of the Amaravati Buddhist Monastery
- Catherine Ashton (born 1956), High Representative of the Union for Foreign Affairs and Security Policy (European Union)
- Janet Backhouse (1938–2004), English expert on illuminated manuscripts
- David Bellamy (1933–2019), English botanist and television presenter
- Helen Caroline Bentwich (1892–1972), English social activist and politician
- Elizabeth Blackwell (1821–1910), pioneer Anglo-American female physician
- Daphne Blundell (1916–2004), British naval officer
- Mary Brazier (1904–1995), neuroscientist
- Sophie Bryant (1850–1922), Anglo-Irish mathematician and feminist
- Anne Buck (1910–2005), cultural historian and curator of dress
- Ada Buisson (1839–1866), English author and novelist
- Margaret Busby, Gold Coast-born publisher and writer
- Waveney Bushell, Guyanese-born educational psychologist
- Dinah Craik (1826–1887), novelist and poet
- Ilse Crawford, English interior designer
- Florence Nightingale David (1909–1993), statistician
- Evelyn Denington, Baroness Denington (1907–1998), English politician
- Peggy Duff (1910–1981), British political activist, organiser of the Campaign for Nuclear Disarmament
- Edith Durham (1863–1944), English traveller, artist and writer
- George Eliot (1819–1880), English novelist
- Christopher Elrington (1930–2009), English historian
- Susan E. Evans, palaeontologist and herpetologist
- Penelope Farmer (born 1939), children's novelist
- Mary Fels (1863–1953), philanthropist, suffragist, Georgist
- Dame Janet Finch (born 1946), English Vice-Chancellor and Professor of Social Relations at Keele University 1995–2010
- Norvela Forster (1931–1993), English businesswoman and politician
- Jane Gardam (born 1928), novelist and children's writer
- Miriam Violet Griffith (1911–1989) electrical engineer, technical author, expert in early heat pumps
- Jean Hanson (1919–1973), English biophysicist and zoologist
- Jean Henderson (1899–1997), English barrister and Liberal Party politician
- Jean Hillier, town and country planning professor
- Elaine Hills-Young (1895–1983), British lead nurse and midwife in Sudan
- Edith Humphrey (1875–1978), English inorganic chemist
- Eva Ibbotson (née Wiesner, 1925–2010), Austro-English children's author
- Alison Jaggar (born 1942), Anglo-American philosopher and feminist professor
- Violet Maud Evelyn Jones RRC (1890 - 1942), Nurse Matron
- Nick Kent (born 1951), English rock critic
- Marjorie Mayson Killby (1889 - 1981), British nurse
- Dudley Knowles (1947–2014), political philosopher and professor
- Jean Langhorne, biologist
- Judith Ledeboer (1901–1990), Dutch-English architect
- Alice Lee (1858–1939), English mathematician
- Kathleen Lonsdale (1903–1971), Anglo-Irish crystallographer
- Adelaide Manning (1828–1905), writer and editor
- Angela Mason (born 1944), English civil servant and gay activist
- Gerda Mayer (1927–2021), English poet born in Czechoslovakia
- John Moloney, English comedian and writer
- Delyth Morgan, Baroness Morgan of Drefelin (born 1961), English crossbench peer in the House of Lords
- Jeremy Northam (born 1961), actor
- Nicholas O'Shaughnessy, English communications professor
- Ursula Owen (born 1937), English publisher and campaigner for free expression
- Margaret Partridge (1891–1967), electrical engineer, contractor, founder member of the Women's Engineering Society and the Electrical Association for Women
- Delphine Parrott (1928–2016), endocrinologist and immunologist
- Marie Patterson (born 1934), trade unionist
- Dame Nancy Broadfield Parkinson (1904–1974), controller of the British Council (Home Division) during the Second World War.
- Edith Helen Paull (1902–1975), nursing matron
- Kate Perugini (1839–1929), English painter and daughter of Charles Dickens
- Rosalind Pitt-Rivers FRS (1907–1990), English biochemist
- Jenny Randerson, Baroness Randerson (born 1948), Welsh Liberal Democrat member of the House of Lords
- Winifred Raphael (1898–1978), English occupational psychologist
- Hazel Alden Reason (1901–1976), English chemist and science writer
- Sarah Remond (1826–1894), African-American abolitionist, one of the few African-American women to speak publicly about abolishing slavery in America during the 1800s.
- Jean Rook (1931–1991), English journalist
- Andrew Cunningham Scott (born 1952), English geologist and professor
- Joe Saward (born 1961), English motor-sports journalist
- Athene Seyler (1889–1990), actress and president of RADA
- Miranda Seymour (born 1948), critic, novelist and biographer
- Jacqueline Simpson (born 1930), researcher and writer on folklore
- Audrey Smith (1915–1981), English cryobiologist
- Mavis Tiller (1901–1989), New Zealand women's advocate, scientist and president of the National Council of Women of New Zealand from 1966 to 1970
- Mary Treadgold (1910–2005), English novelist and children's writer
- Fred Trethewey (born 1949), priest and Archdeacon of Dudley
- Margaret Tuke (1862–1847), English academic and educator
- Sarah Tyacke (born 1945), historian of cartography
- Valerie Vaz (born 1954), Labour MP for Walsall South (UK Parliament constituency)
- Amanda Vickery (born 1962), historian and broadcaster
- Diana Warwick, Baroness Warwick of Undercliffe (born 1945), Labour member of the House of Lords
- Evelyn Whitaker (1844–1929), English children's writer
- Alex Wilkie (born 1948), mathematician
- Elizabeth Williams (1895–1986), mathematician and educationist
- Katharine Worth (1922–2015), drama professor
- Margaret Wright (1940–2012), British Green Party politician
- Florence Yeldham (1877–1945), school teacher and historian of arithmetic
- Alice Zimmern (1855–1939), translator and suffragist

== Principals ==
- Elizabeth Jesser Reid, Founder (1849–1864) then run by trustees until first principal appointed
- Dame Emily Penrose, First principal (1893–1898) also Royal Holloway (1898–1907)
- Ethel Hurlbatt (1898–1906)
- Dame Margaret Jansen Tuke (1907–1929)
- Geraldine Emma May Jebb CBE (1930–1951)
- Norah Lillian Penston (1951–1964)
- Elizabeth Millicent Chilver (1964–1971), later Principal of Lady Margaret Hall, Oxford
- John Nicholson Black (1971–1981)
- Dorothy Wedderburn, last Principal of Bedford College (1981–1985)

== Sources ==
Tuke, Margaret Janson (1939). A History of Bedford College for Women, 1849-1937. London: Oxford University Press.
