= Mathematical Association =

Professional society concerned with mathematics education

The Mathematical Association
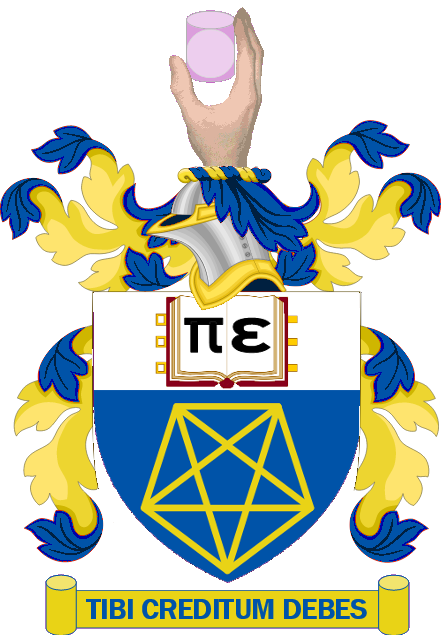
- Abbreviation: MA
- Formation: 1871
- Legal status: Non-profit organisation and registered charity
- Purpose: Professional organisation for mathematics educators
- Location(s): The Mathematical Association, Charnwood Building, Holywell Park, Loughborough University Science and Enterprise Park, Leicestershire, LE11 3AQ
- Region served: UK
- Main organ: MA Council President – Professor Nira Chamberlain (2023-2024)
- Website: https://www.m-a.org.uk

The Mathematical Association is a professional society concerned with mathematics education in the United Kingdom.

== History ==
It was founded in 1871 as the Association for the Improvement of Geometrical Teaching and renamed to the Mathematical Association in 1897. It was the first teachers' subject organisation formed in England. In March 1927, it held a three-day meeting in Grantham to commemorate the bicentenary of the death of Sir Isaac Newton, attended by Sir J. J. Thomson (discoverer of the electron), Sir Frank Watson Dyson – the Astronomer Royal, Sir Horace Lamb, and G. H. Hardy.

In 1951, Mary Cartwright became the first female president of the Mathematical Association.

In the 1960s, when comprehensive education was being introduced, the Association was in favour of the 11-plus system. For maths teachers training at university, a teaching award that was examined was the Diploma of the Mathematical Association, later known as the Diploma in Mathematical Education of the Mathematical Association.

== Function ==
It exists to "bring about improvements in the teaching of mathematics and its applications, and to provide a means of communication among students and teachers of mathematics". Since 1894 it has published The Mathematical Gazette. It is one of the participating bodies in the quadrennial British Congress of Mathematics Education, organised by the Joint Mathematical Council, and it holds its annual general meeting as part of the Congress.

== Structure ==
It is based in the south-east of Leicester on London Road (A6), just south of the Charles Frears campus of De Montfort University.

Aside from the council, it has seven other specialist committees.

=== Regions ===
Its branches are sometimes shared with the Association of Teachers of Mathematics (ATM):

- Birmingham
- Cambridge
- East Midlands
- Exeter
- Gloucester
- Liverpool
- London
- Greater Manchester
- Meridian
- Stoke and Staffordshire
- Sheffield
- Sussex
- Yorkshire

== Past presidents ==
Past presidents of The Association for the Improvement of Geometrical Teaching included:

- 1871 Thomas Archer Hirst
- 1878 Robert Baldwin Hayward MA, FRS
- 1889 G M Minchin MA, FRS
- 1891 James Joseph Sylvester
- 1892 The Reverend C Taylor DD
- 1893 R Wormell MA, DSc
- 1895 Joseph Larmor

Past presidents of The Mathematical Association have included:

- 1897 Alfred Lodge
- 1899–1900 Robert Stawell Ball
- 1901 John Fletcher Moulton, Baron Moulton
- 1903 Andrew Forsyth
- 1905 George Ballard Mathews
- 1907 George H. Bryan
- 1909–1910 Herbert Hall Turner
- 1911–1912 E. W. Hobson
- 1913–1914 Alfred George Greenhill
- 1915–1916 Alfred North Whitehead
- 1918–1919 Percy Nunn
- 1920 E. T. Whittaker
- 1921 James Wilson
- 1922–1923 Thomas Little Heath
- 1924–1925 G. H. Hardy
- 1926–1927 Micaiah John Muller Hill
- 1928–1929 William Fleetwood Sheppard
- 1930–1931 Arthur Eddington
- 1932–1933 G. N. Watson
- 1934 Eric Harold Neville
- 1935 A W Siddons
- 1936 Andrew Forsyth
- 1937 Louis Napoleon George Filon
- 1938 W Hope-Jones
- 1939 W C Fletcher
- 1944 C O Tuckey MA
- 1945 Sydney Chapman
- 1946 Warin Foster Bushell
- 1947 George Barker Jeffery
- 1948 Harold Spencer Jones
- 1949 A Robson MA
- 1950 Professor H R Hasse MA, DSc
- 1951 Mary Cartwright
- 1952 K S Snell MA
- 1953 Professor T A A Broadbent MA
- 1954 W. V. D. Hodge
- 1955 G L Parsons MA
- 1956 George Frederick James Temple
- 1957 W J Langford JP, MSc
- 1958 Max Newman
- 1959 Louise Doris Adams
- 1960 Edwin A. Maxwell
- 1961 J T Combridge MA, MSc
- 1962 Professor V C A Ferraro PhD, DIC
- 1963 J B Morgan MA
- 1964 Ida Busbridge
- 1965 Elizabeth Williams
- 1966 F W Kellaway BSc
- 1967 A.P. Rollett
- 1968 Charles Coulson
- 1969 Bertha Swirles
- 1970 James Lighthill
- 1971 B T Bellis MA, FRSE, FIMA
- 1972 C T Daltry BSc, FIMA
- 1973 William McCrea
- 1974 Margaret Hayman
- 1975 Reuben Goodstein
- 1976 E Kerr BSc, PhD, FIMA, FBCS
- 1977 Professor G Matthews MA, PhD, FIMA
- 1978 Alan Tammadge
- 1979 Clive W. Kilmister
- 1980 D A Quadling MA, FIMA, later OBE
- 1981 Michael Atiyah
- 1982 F J Budden BSc
- 1983 Rolph Ludwig Edward Schwarzenberger
- 1984 P B Coaker BSc, ARCS, DIC, FIMA, FBCS
- 1985 Hilary Shuard
- 1986 Anita Straker
- 1987 Margaret Rayner
- 1988 Albert G. Howson
- 1989 Mr Peter Reynolds MA
- 1990 Margaret Brown
- 1991 Alan J. Bishop
- 1992 Mr John Hersee MA
- 1993 Dr William Wynne-Wilson BA, PhD
- 1994 Mary Bradburn
- 1995 E. Roy Ashley
- 1996 W. P. Richardson MBE
- 1997 Tony Gardiner
- 1998 Professor J Chris Robson
- 1999 John S Berry
- 2000 Mr Stephen Abbott BSc, MSc
- 2001 Dr Sue Sanders Cert.Ed, BA, MEd, PhD
- 2002 Mr Barry Lewis BSc, BA, FIMA
- 2003 Christopher Zeeman
- 2004 Professor Adam McBride OBE
- 2005 Sue Singer
- 2006 Mr Doug French
- 2007 Rob Eastaway
- 2008 Mr Robert Barbour
- 2009 Mrs Jane Imrie
- 2010 David Acheson
- 2011 Dr Paul Andrews
- 2012 Professor Marcus Du Sautoy OBE FRS
- 2013 Mr Peter Ransom MBE
- 2014 Lynne McClure OBE
- 2015 Dr Peter M. Neumann OBE
- 2016 Dr Jennie Golding
- 2017 Mr Tom Roper
- 2018 Professor Mike Askew
- 2019 Dr Ems Lord
- 2020 Professor Hannah Fry
- 2021 Dr Chris Pritchard
- 2022 Dr Colin Foster
- 2023 Professor Nira Chamberlain OBE
- 2024 Charlie Stripp
- 2025 Professor Paul Glaister CBE (President)

== Arms ==
Coat of arms of Mathematical Association

Adopted
Granted 1 June 1965
Crest
On a wreath of the colours a dexter hand couped at the wrist holding a crystal cylinder enclosing a like sphere all Proper.
Escutcheon
Azure a representation of a pentagon with diagonals Or on a chief Argent an open book Proper inscribed with the Greek letters Pi and Epsilon Sable and edged and clasped Or.

== See also ==
- London Mathematical Society
- Institute of Mathematics and its Applications
