= Climate change art =

Art inspired by climate change

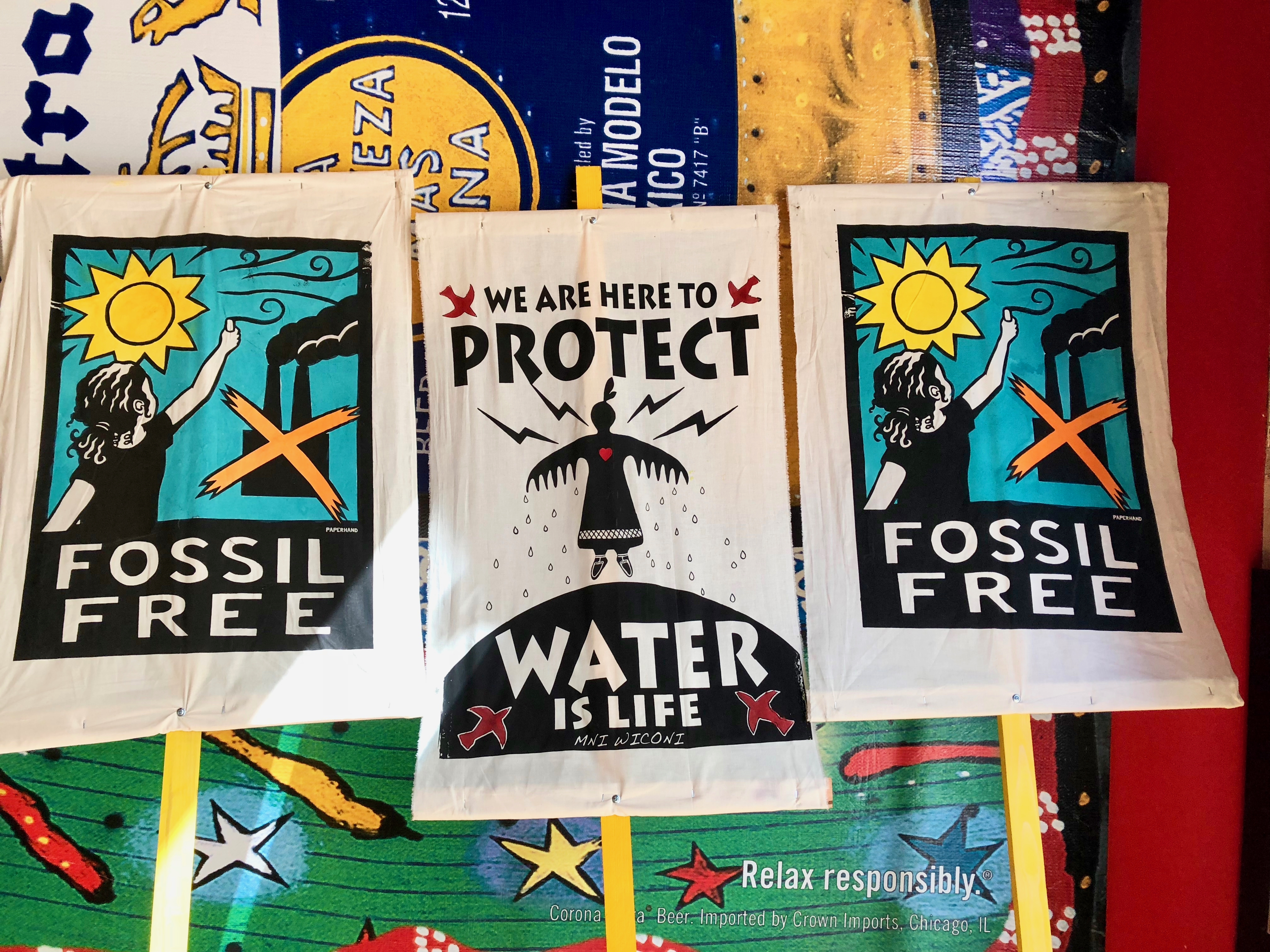
Climate change placards.

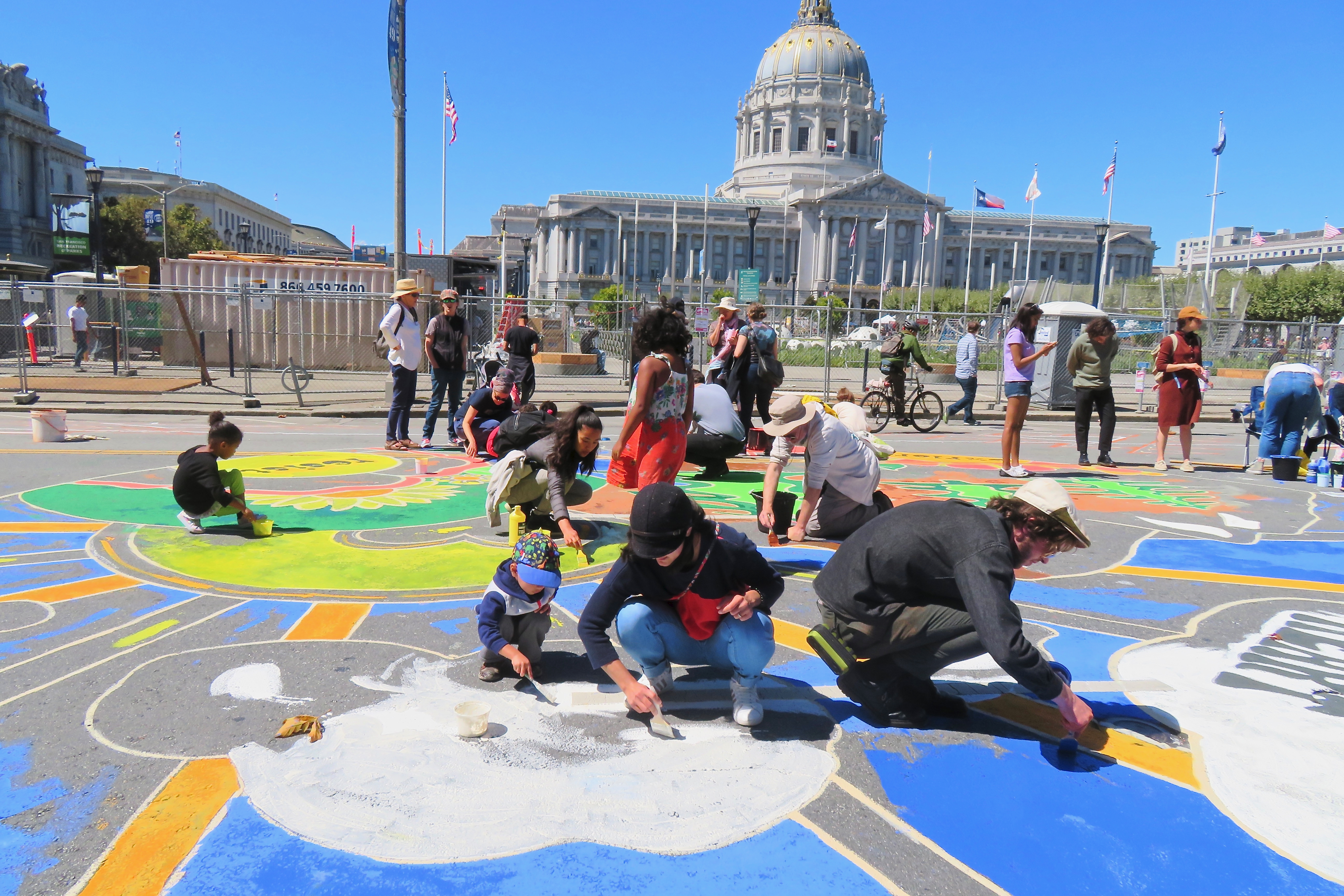
Mural created at the Climate Action March in San Francisco on 18 September 2018.

Climate change art is art inspired by climate change and global warming, generally intended to overcome humans' hardwired tendency to value personal experience over data and to disengage from data-based representations by making the data "vivid and accessible". One goal of climate change art is to "raise awareness of the crisis", as well as engage viewers politically and environmentally.

Some climate change art involves community involvement with the environment. Other approaches involve revealing socio-political concerns through their various artistic forms, such as painting, video, photography, sound and films. These works are intended to encourage viewers to reflect on their daily actions "in a socially responsible manner to preserve and protect the planet".

Climate change art is created both by scientists and by non-scientist artists. The field overlaps with data art.

== History ==
Omnipresent and relevant, yet abstract and statistical by nature, as well as invisible for the naked eye – climate change is a subject matter in need for perception and cognition support par excellence.

The Guardian reported that in response to a backlash in the 1990s against fossil fuels and nuclear plants, major energy companies stepped up their philanthropic giving, including to arts organizations, "to a point where many major national institutions were on the payroll of the fossil fuel giants," effectively silencing many environmentally-focused artists.

In 2005 Bill McKibben wrote an article, What the Warming World Needs Now Is Art, Sweet Art that argued that "An intellectual understanding of the scientific facts was not enough – if we wanted to move forward and effect meaningful change, we needed to engage the other side of our brains. We needed to approach the problem with our imagination. And the people best suited to help us do that, he believed, were the artists." According to climate change in the arts organization The Arctic Cycle, "It took some time for artists to heed the call."

In 2009 The Guardian reported that the art world was "waking up to climate-change art." Reporting on the 2020 We Make Tomorrow conference on climate change and the arts in London, Artnet News commented that "instead of being seduced by sponsorships from deep-pocketed organizations invested in the fossil-fuel industry, institutions should look for new funding models."

== Effects and influence ==
=== Representation and interpretation ===
According to Artnet News, climate change can be represented meaningfully through art because "Art has a way of getting ahead of the general discourse because it can convey information in novel ways." Climate change artworks differ in how they are interpreted by and how they impact the viewer. Laura Kim Sommer and Christian Andreas Klöckner (both from the Norwegian University of Science and Technology) conducted a survey of attendees of the Parisian art festival ArtCOP21 in 2015 (that was held at the same time as the 2015 United Nations Climate Change Conference) regarding 37 artworks within the festival. The responses led Sommer and Klöckner's research to develop four characterizations of the works of art in terms of their content and the responses of the viewers to the artworks. The first categorization was labeled "the comforting utopia", which meant that the artwork had given off positive emotions but did not inspire people to enact positive climate action. The second categorization was labeled "the challenging dystopia", which meant that the artwork had given off negative emotions and greatly inspired climate nonaction. The third categorization was labeled "the mediocre mythology", which meant that the artwork had given off neutral emotions and did not inspire people to enact positive climate action.

The final categorization was labeled "the awesome solution", which meant that the work of art had given off both positive and negative emotions but inspired people to enact positive climate action. The data collected by Sommer and Klöckner was categorized by them in 2019 into different psychological characteristics and connected these to functions of the brain to see where various emotions were triggered from observing the art and concluded that works of art that were not in "the challenging dystopia" category were generally more likely to leave audiences open to positive climate action, with "the awesome solution" works of art being the most likely of all the categories to inspire positive climate action.

Journalist Betsy Mason wrote in Knowable that humans are visual creatures by nature, absorbing information in graphic form that would elude them in words, adding that bad visuals can impair public understanding of science. Similarly, Bang Wong, creative director of MIT's Broad Institute, stated that visualizations can reveal patterns, trends, and connections in data that are difficult or impossible to find any other way.

In particular, climate change art has been used both to make scientific data more accessible to non-scientists and to express people's fears. Some research indicates that climate change art is not particularly effective in changing peoples views, though art with a "hopeful" message gives people ideas for change. Projecting a positive message, climate scientist Ed Hawkins said that "infiltrating popular culture is a means of triggering a change of attitude that will lead to mass action".

Students who are taught means to illustrate the concepts of global warming expressed through art can show greater learning gains than by learning the scientific basis alone. This was illustrated by a study conducted at a public high school in Portugal by Julia Bentz (a postgraduate researcher for the Centre for Ecology, Evolution, and Environmental Changes at the University of Lisbon in Portugal) in 2018 and 2019. In this study, 70 high school students between the ages of 16 and 18 undertook two separate projects relating to arts and global warming. The first art project involved the students finding a small but impactful change in their lives that leads to positive global warming change and sticking to it for 30 days, where the data they collected was reflected in various group discussions and individual writing and art projects. The second art project involved the students reading global warming-focused short stories then discussing their takeaways in group discussions and producing art projects focused on specific topics concerning what they discussed. Bentz took first-hand observations of all of the various group and individual discussions & assignments and transmuted them into analytic memos that suggested that the above projects be used by teachers to more positively engage their students more effectively about global warming than a more fear-based approach.

Eva Amsen, writing in Forbes Magazine in 2019, argued that people who engage with climate change art feel a sense of belonging, a feeling of connection to a cause, and a sense of empowerment. Participatory climate change art, such as downloading warming stripes graphics for one's own locality or using a climate-related logo, provides an interactive element that gets people involved.

Lucia Pietroiusti, the curator of "general ecology" at the Serpentine Galleries, suggested "a radical redefinition of what constitutes an artwork...to include environmental campaigns," saying that "By calling something an artwork, you are allowing an institution to support it."

=== Expansion of formats ===
In recent years, the expansion of climate change art beyond purely visual representations has allowed for an expansion of audiences able to appreciate and experience this art, specifically those who experience Visual impairment. These musical forms of climate change art include pieces performed using environmental media to represent climate change and popular music whose lyrical aspects address climate change topics. Climate change composer Daniel Crawford said that "climate scientists have a standard toolbox to communicate their data, and what we [climate change artists] are trying to do is to add to that another tool to that toolbox to people who might get more out of this than maps graphs and numbers". In the performing arts, there has been an increasing number of stage productions related to climate change, such as those performed by the global movement, Climate Change Theatre Action.

A 2022 survey article published in Music and Science noted that music was already being written and performed to address the climate crisis, but said that music psychology research had not addressed that question directly. The article said that there is "strong evidence" for the power of music "to change listeners' and performers' emotions, moods, thoughts, levels of empathy, and beliefs", and urged further research.

=== Use of climate change art by non-governmental organizations ===
Various non-governmental organizations (or NGOs) work to emphasize the effects climate change-inspired art can have to inspire positive climate action worldwide. In Australia, the NGO CLIMARTE aims for people to not just get the right information out through works of art made from the joint effort of artists and from climate change-focused scientists alike, but to enact positive climate action, opening a gallery based on such works of art in the Richmond neighborhood of Melbourne. In the Netherlands, the NGO Fossil Free Culture works to sever the linkage between fine arts organizations and global petroleum corporations, and to see that works of art that are critical of climate change get the proper forum to enact positive climate action. Based out of Yangon, Myanmar, but operating all over Southeast Asia, the NGO Kinnari Ecological Theatre Project (or KETEP) stages folk performative arts from the regional area with the intention of confronting an issue related to climate change decided by the performers to spread to its audience in hopes of enacting positive climate action. In the United Kingdom, the NGO Platform works to incorporate education into the mixture of science and fine arts by providing curriculums to schools that teach climate change science through various arts and literature-based projects.

=== Emphasis on solutions ===
The 2015 exhibition 'Art Works For Change' aims to demonstrate the options available to reduce emissions and other climate change impacts, such as reducing carbon footprints, conserving energy, and making sustainable transportation choices among others.

== Reception ==
Journalist Betsy Mason wrote in Knowable that humans are visual creatures by nature, absorbing information in graphic form that would elude them in words, adding that bad visuals can impair public understanding of science. Similarly, Bang Wong, creative director of MIT's Broad Institute, stated that visualizations can reveal patterns, trends, and connections in data that are difficult or impossible to find any other way.

Malcolm Miles (professor of Cultural Theory at the University of Plymouth, U.K.) is among those who believe that art that is centered on global warming can potentially normalize climate inaction. Miles cites the Natural Reality art exhibition that was held in Aachen, Germany in 1999 as an example, which had a credo of needing to find original ideas for how to depict nature "'because the images of the visible nature it processed before have lost their validity'". Miles similarly mentions the 2006 art exhibition Climate Change and Cultural Change that was held in both Newcastle and Gateshead, in northern England, which tried to be more direct in their climate advocacy by commissioning works of art such as "a montage by [artist] Peter Kennard depicting the Earth attached to a petrol pump, choking on black oil" and Water Mist Wall (2005), a video installation by David Buckland that detailed his efforts to provide a carbon-free schooner ride to the arctic to see first-hand the melting glaciers and icebergs caused by global warming. These intense visual displays led to a numbing effect among audience members, which led not to positive climate action but to climate inaction.

Miles also argues that art that is centered on global warming might be more truly centered on singularly moving forward the artist's feeling of self-representation and not propagating concrete positive change about global warming, that these works of art can only potentially spread awareness and nothing more. The history of 'found objects' as art that started in the Dadaist movement of modern art in the early 20th Century has transitioned in more recent years into "the art [sculptures] of natural conservation of Andy Goldsworthy", which comments on how modern landscapes are less focused on the natural aspects of an environment but more so on human interaction within an environment such as "war memorials" and "country walking". Miles mentions that the majority of people who see Goldsworthy's work do not see them in-person – and outdoors – but through photos found in books, websites, and gallery shows. Similarly, Miles cites the Groundworks art exhibition held in Pittsburgh, Pennsylvania in 2005 that was curated by "art historian Grant Kester", whom Miles quoted in saying that when talking about an artist's relationship to nature that "'the artist's brush can as easily resemble a dissecting scalpel as it can a lover's caress'"; which Kester says is due to an artist's need to be a part of the global market economy to sustain themselves.

Finally, Miles argues that art that is centered on global warming that is also seen to be aesthetically boring or awful is more likely to lead to inaction than works of art that are seen to be aesthetically exciting or awe-inspiring. The reviews of Goldworth's sculptures by David Matless – a professor of Cultural Geography at the University of Nottingham, U.K. – and George Revill – a professor of Cultural Historical Geography at The Open University, U.K. – were done so not so much for their aesthetic quality – which they go out of their way to not comment on – but for their environmental advocacy are used by Miles as an example of this.

Writing about Ed Hawkins’s warming stripes, which featured in Pirouette: Turning Points in Design at the Museum of Modern Art, Mark Feeney remarked that "seen in strictly visual terms, the graphic is quite pleasing to look at. It could be a Morris Louis painting. Understood conceptually, it’s alarming to contemplate."

== Examples ==
Olafur Eliasson's "Ice Watch" piece is an example of climate change art.

Researchers analyzing artwork created between 2000 and 2016 found that climate change art production increased over the period.

In 1998, Matthew Brutner composed Sikuigvik (The Time of Ice Melting), which began as an ode to the "beauty of the Arctic", but over time has evolved into a frightening representation of the loss of the Arctic environment.

In 2002, Alan Sonfist created a series of wood sculptures sourced from the Roybal Fire in Santa Fe, New Mexico. The work included 22 pieces of salvaged wood standing vertically on concrete pedestals with tree seeds scattered on the surrounding floorspace, using natural elements to make ecological processes and concepts tangible. Along with the sculptures, he created a collection of paintings. Dian Parker writes in ArtNet, "In Burning Forest, a more recent series of paintings, Sonfist depicts trees selected from the majestic 19th-century landscapes of his “heroes,” the Hudson River School artists. Sonfist disrupts their visions of America’s pristine natural beauty, however, by setting the trees on fire to visually represent the climate crisis. He continues to work on this series to this day."

A group started in 2005 to create crochet versions of coral reefs grew by 2022 to over 20,000 contributors in what became the Crochet Coral Reef Project. Organized by Margaret and Christine Wertheim, the project promotes awareness of the effects of global warming. Project creations have been displayed in galleries and museums by an estimated 2 million people. Many creations apply hyperbolic (curved) geometric shapes—distinguished from Euclidean (flat) geometry—to emulate natural structures.

In 2007, artist Eve Mosher used a sports-field chalk marker to draw a blue "high-water" line around Manhattan and Brooklyn, showing the areas that would be underwater if climate change predictions are realized. Her HighWaterLine Project has since drawn high-water lines around Bristol, Philadelphia, and two coastal cities in Florida.

In 2008, Greenpeace collaborated with street artist Mark Jenkins on a series of sculptures installed around Washington, D.C. The human figures were given polar bear heads and ragged clothing to convey displacement and homelessness caused by global warming. Police treated one figure near the Columbia Heights station as a suspicious package, and the station was closed while the bomb squad examined it.

In 2012, filmmaker Jeff Orlowski made Chasing Ice, documenting photographer James Balog's Extreme Ice Survey, which uses time-lapse photography to show the disappearance of glaciers over time.

In 2015, an online exhibition called 'Footing The Bill: Art and Our Ecological Footprint', was created by Art Works For Change to show a range of artist expressions (such as Sebastian Copeland and Fred Tomaselli) of climate change through their work.

Starting in 2017 The Tempestry Project encouraged fiber artists to create "tempestries", scarf-size banners showing temperature change over time. Each tempestry is knitted or crocheted, one row per day in a color representing that day's high temperature, for a year. Two or more tempestries for the same location, each representing different years, are displayed together to show daily-high temperature change over time.

In 2018 artist Xavier Cortada's project Underwater Home Owner's Association placed signs in front yards throughout Miami, Florida indicating each property's height above sea level to illustrate what the sea level rise would flood that property. British artist Marcus Coates's project Extinct Animals consisted of a sculpture of sixteen hands clasped together in poses that created a shadow of a figure of an animal that is close to extinction. The meaning of human hands casting a shadow of a near-extinct animal intends to relay a message that humans are the culprits of this extinction.

In 2019, the Grantham Institute - Climate Change and the Environment, Imperial College London, launched its inaugural Grantham Art Prize, commissioning original works by six artists who collaborated with climate researchers.

The lobby of the MIT Museum has a sculpture made from thousands of feet of plastic twine, with each strand representing Earth's temperature going back to the ice age. Blue and green strands reflect cooler climates than the reds and oranges. The current temperature is represented by a single yellow piece of twine, and the sculpture then spreads out into a broad web representing possible futures with reds and blues.

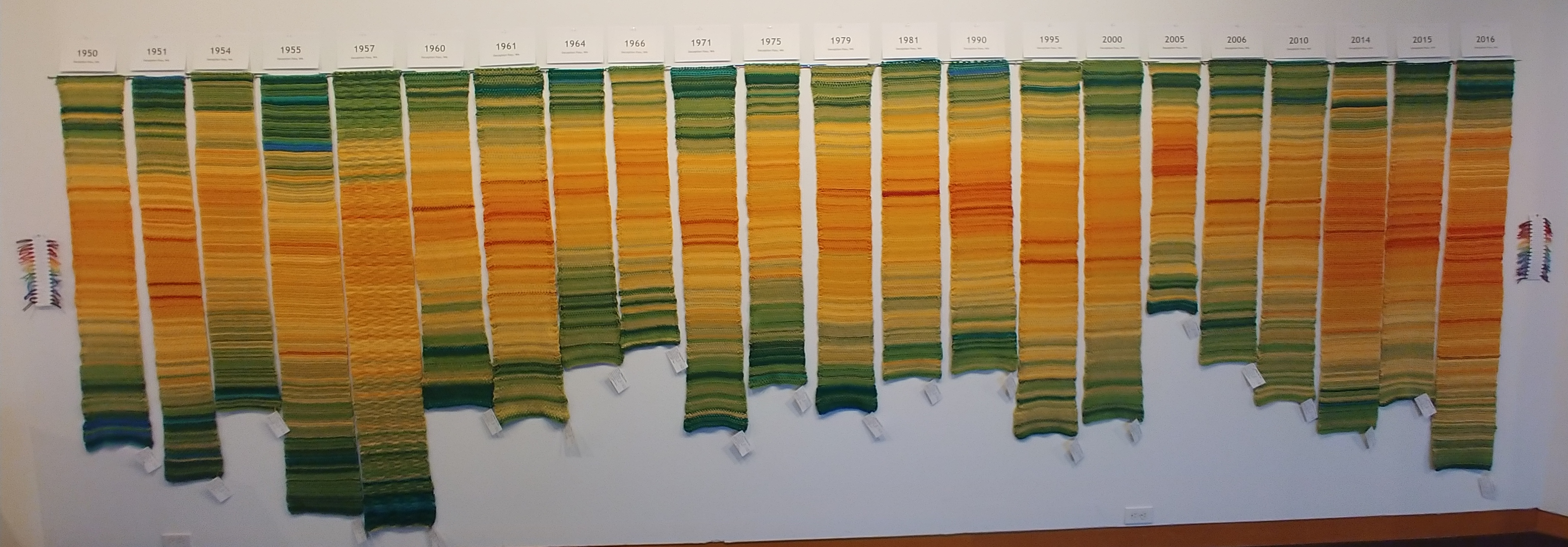
Tempestries, an example of climate change art, representing change in temperature in a given location over time

Animated GIF: This Ed Hawkins climate spiral portrays changing temperatures as a spiral with expanding radius.

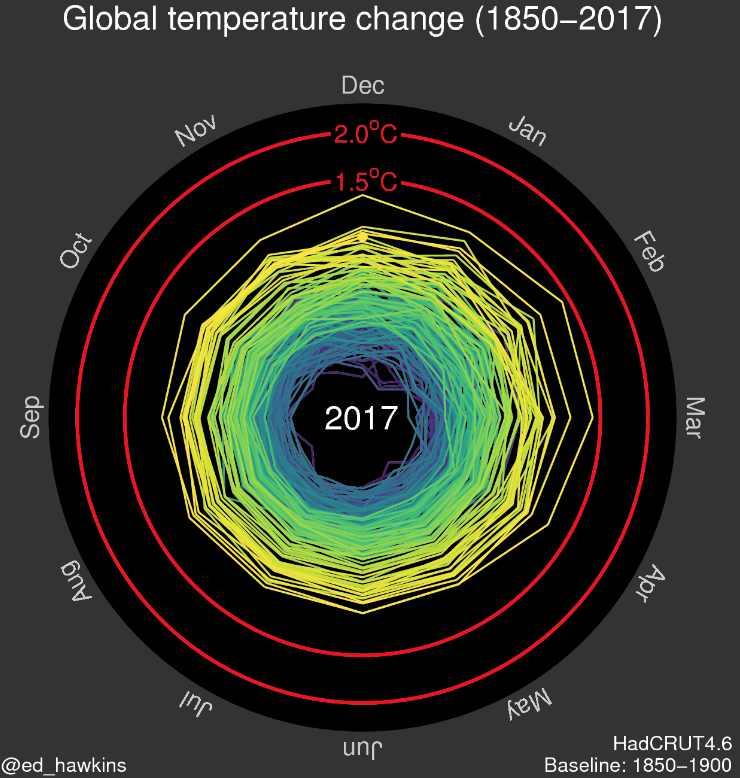
Final frame of a climate spiral portrays recent warmer temperatures with brighter colors further from the center.

Ed Hawkins' warming stripes graphics portray global warming as a series of color-coded stripes, purposely devoid of scientific notation to be quickly understandable by non-scientists. A version of this graphic was in a 2025 exhibit in the Museum of Modern Art.

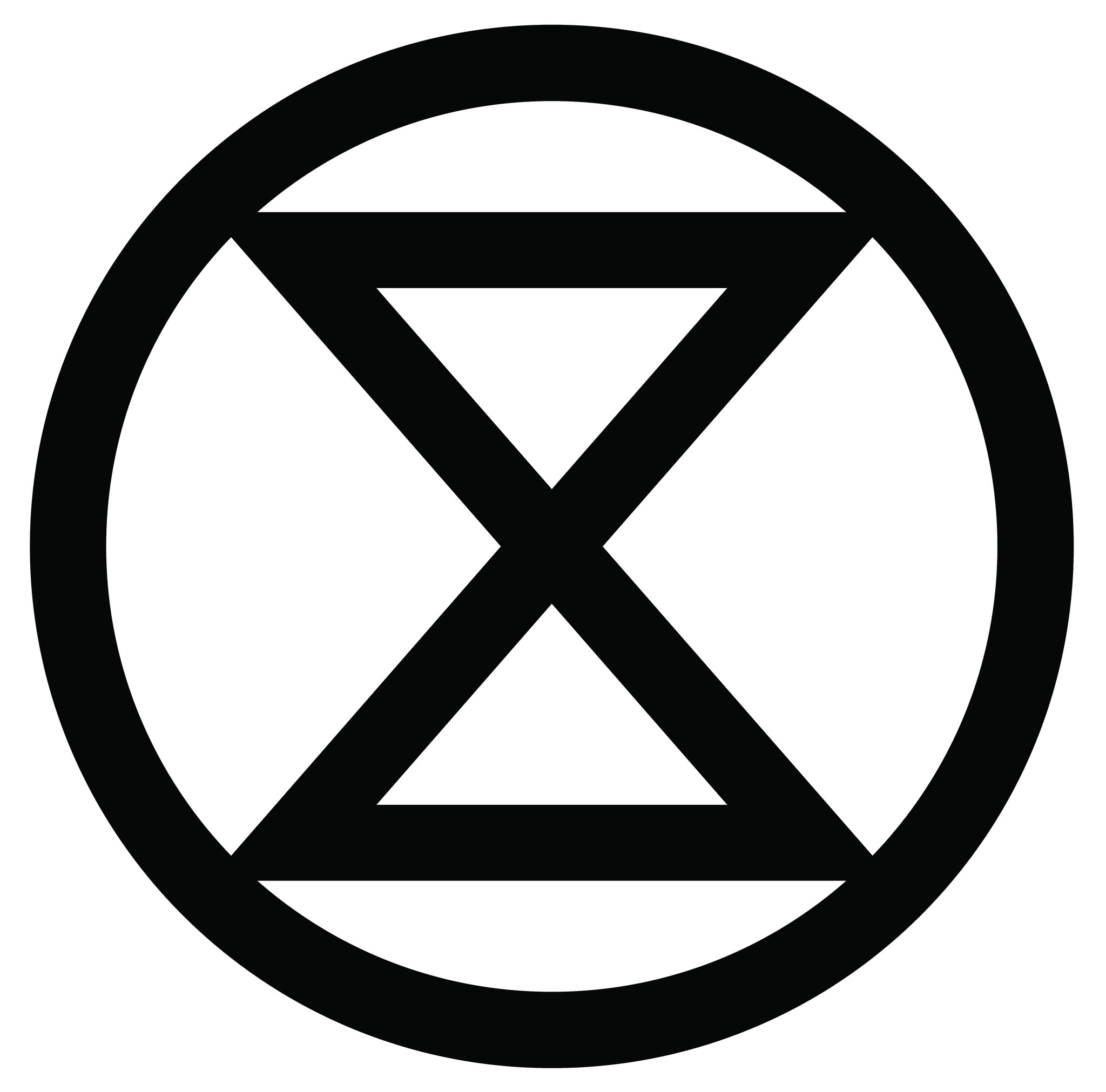
Extinction Rebellion's logo, symbolizing the Earth enclosing an hourglass.

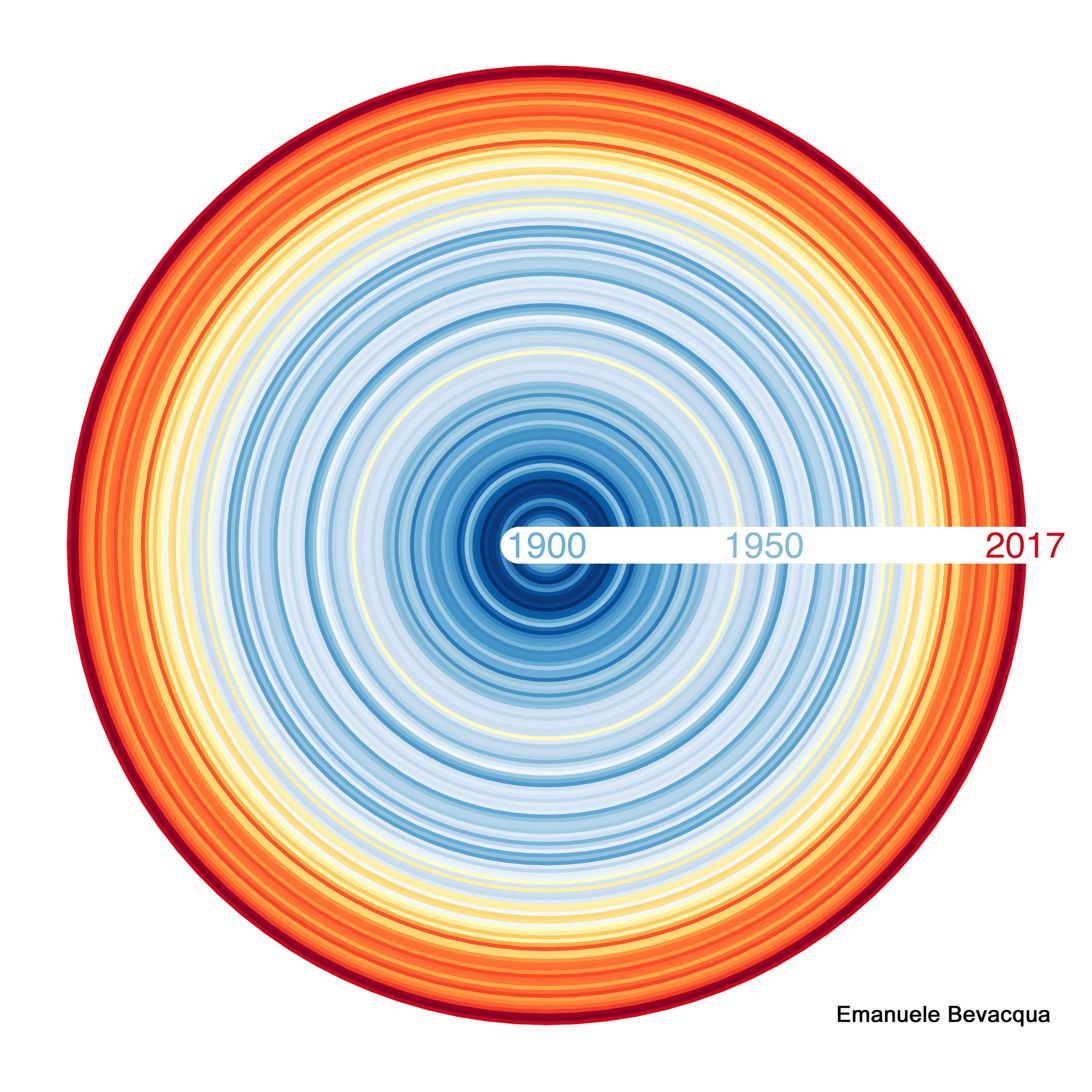
Emanuele Bevacqua's circular warming stripes graphic portrays global warming as color-coded rings that evolve from blues to reds with increasing temperatures.

An alternative adaptation of warming stripes, rendered in concentric octagons to suggest a stop sign.

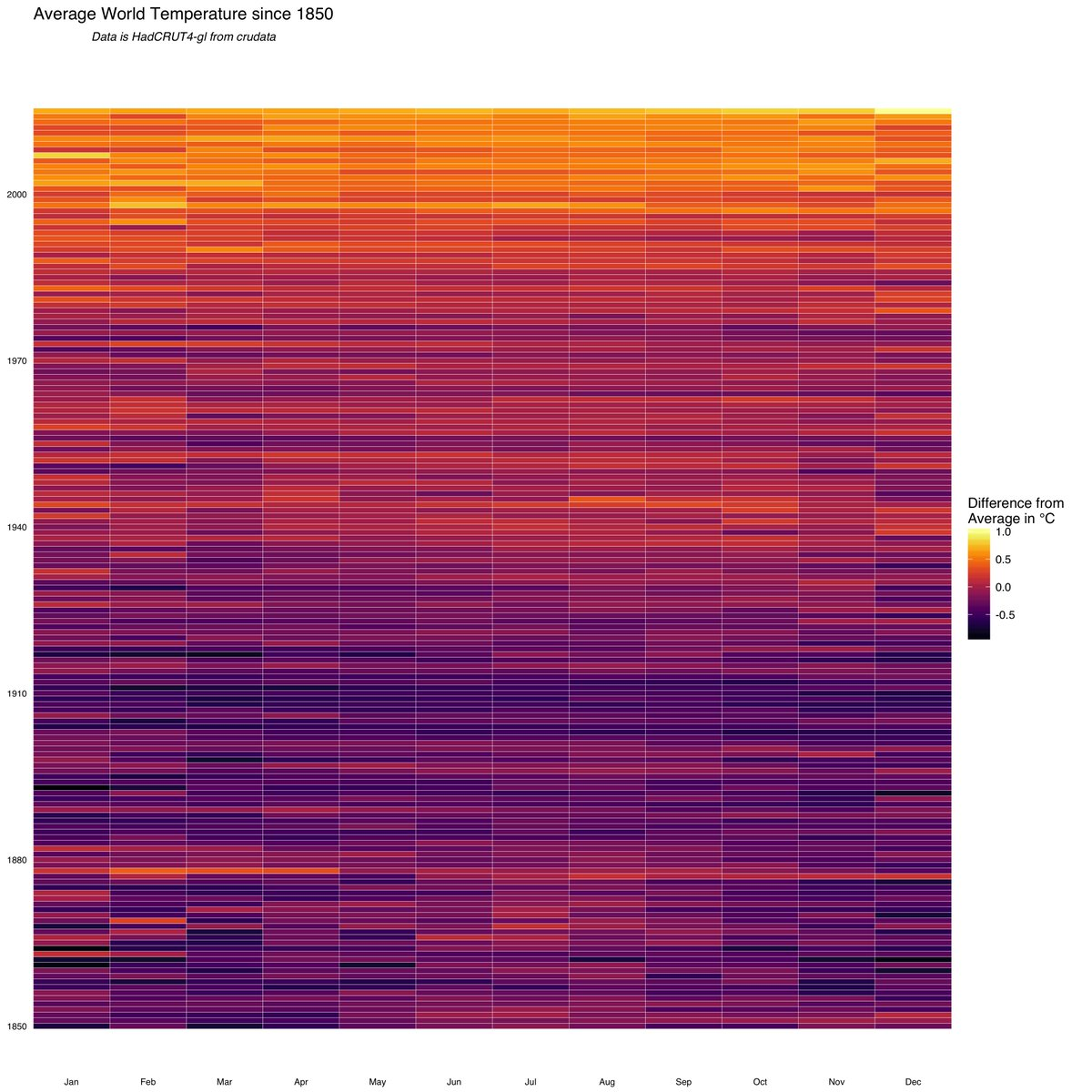
This stacked warming stripes graphic—technically a two-dimensional heat map—organizes global temperatures in two dimensions (month and year).

Video: Antti Lipponen portrays global warming by changing lengths of colored radial spikes arranged by country.

Video: Antti Lipponen portrays global warming as ring with colors that evolve over time.

Sequence of piano notes portraying respective annual global average temperature readings since 1850, similar to Daniel Crawford's cello composition, "Song of Our Warming Planet". The sequence portrays global warming with notes of progressively higher pitches.

== See also ==
- Craftivism
- Environmentalism
- Climate change
- Environmental Art
- Ecological Art
