= Groundskeeping =

Activity of tending an area of land

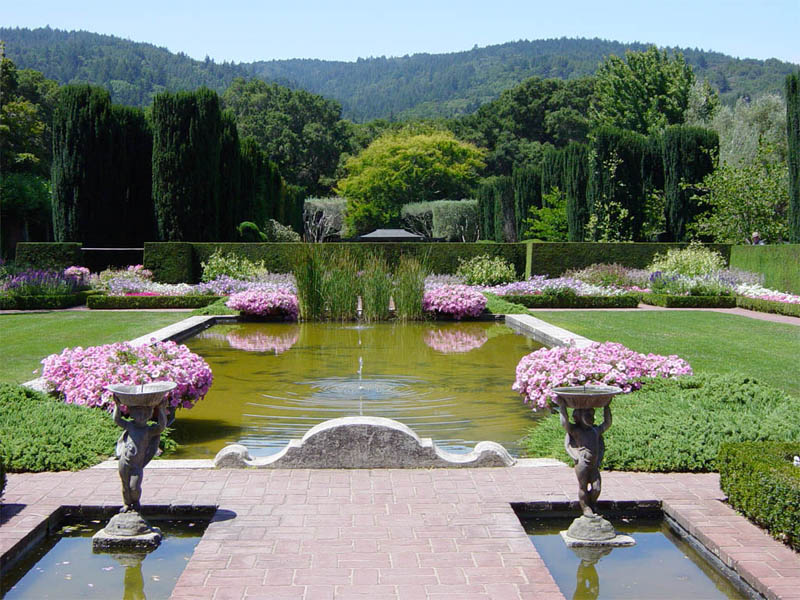
A manicured landscape at a private residence

Groundskeeping is the activity of tending an area of land for aesthetic or functional purposes, typically in an institutional setting. It includes mowing grass, trimming hedges, pulling weeds, planting flowers, etc. The U.S. Department of Labor estimated that more than 900,000 workers are employed in the landscape maintenance and groundskeeping services industry in the United States in 2006. Of these over 300,000 workers were greenskeepers for golf courses, schools, resorts, and public parks.

== Occupation ==
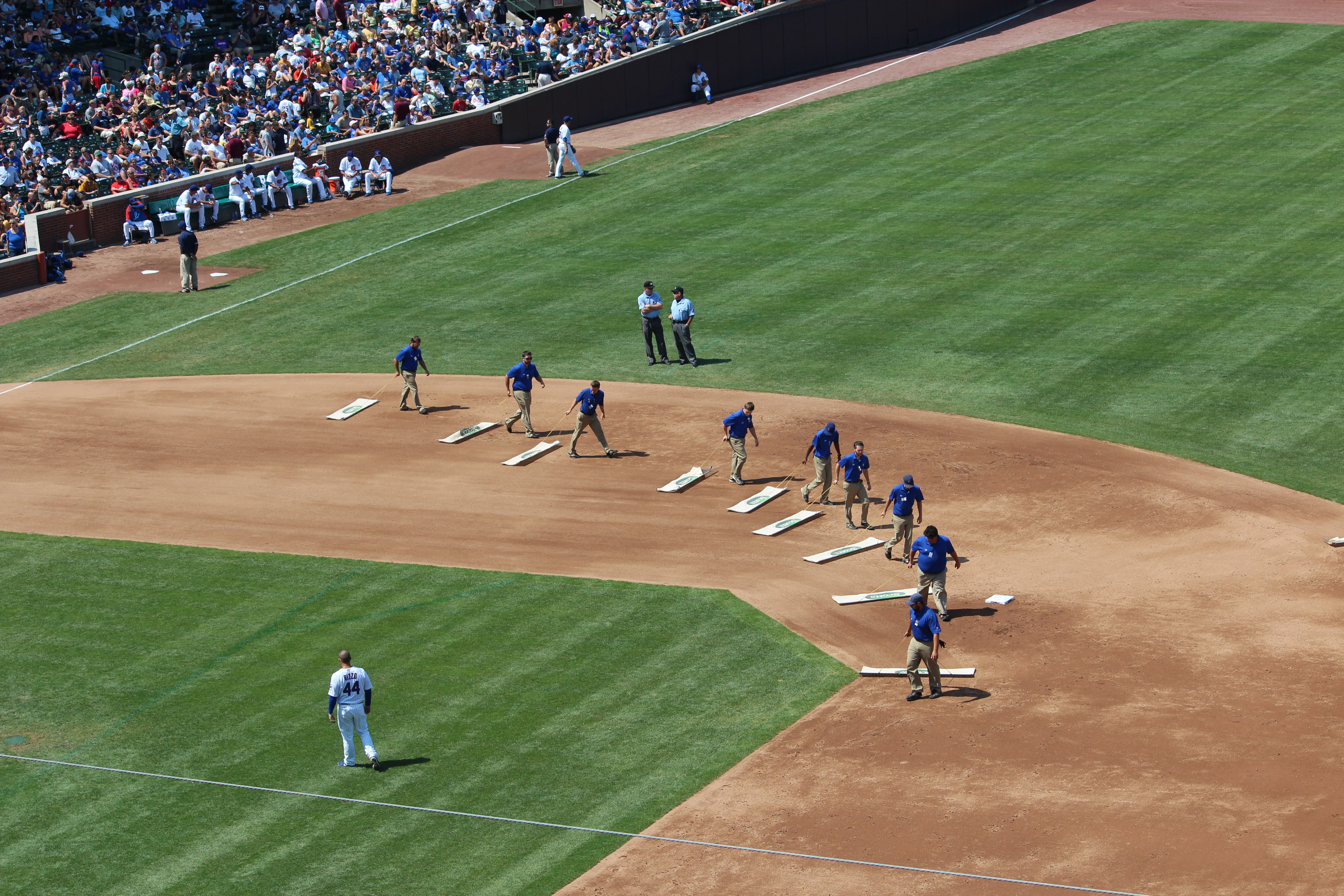
Grounds crew at Wrigley Field smoothing the infield dirt of a baseball diamond

A groundskeeper is a person who maintains landscaping, gardens or sporting venues (and their vegetation where appropriate) for appearance and functionality. In Britain the word groundsman (occasionally groundswoman if appropriate) or park-keeper is used much more commonly. The Football Association confers a Groundsman of the Year award. In Australia, the word curator is often used for a person undertaking this job, especially those involving cricket pitches. At university campuses, groundskeepers are often called horticulturists. The equivalent on a golf course is a greenskeeper.

The U.S. Bureau of Labor Statistics (BLS) estimated in May 2015 that statistical group 37-3011 "Landscaping and Groundskeeping Workers" numbered 895,600 with a median annual wage of $25,030. The BLS describes the functions of this group as "Workers typically perform a variety of tasks, which may include any combination of the following: sod laying, mowing, trimming, planting, watering, fertilizing, digging, raking, sprinkler installation, and installation of mortarless segmental concrete masonry wall units".

== Equipment ==
Groundskeeping equipment comprise tools and vehicles used in groundskeeping, including:

- Mowers
- Lawn mowers
- Tractors
- String trimmers
- Snow blowers
- Snow plows
- Edgers
- Rotary brushes
- Rakes
- Leaf blowers
- Shovels
- Trowels
- Sprinklers
- Garden tools
- Watering cans or truck mounted watering system
- Line markers

== See also ==
- Turf management
- Professional Grounds Management Society
