= Julia Slingo =

British meteorologist (born 1950)

Dame Julia Slingo DBE FRS HonFInstP
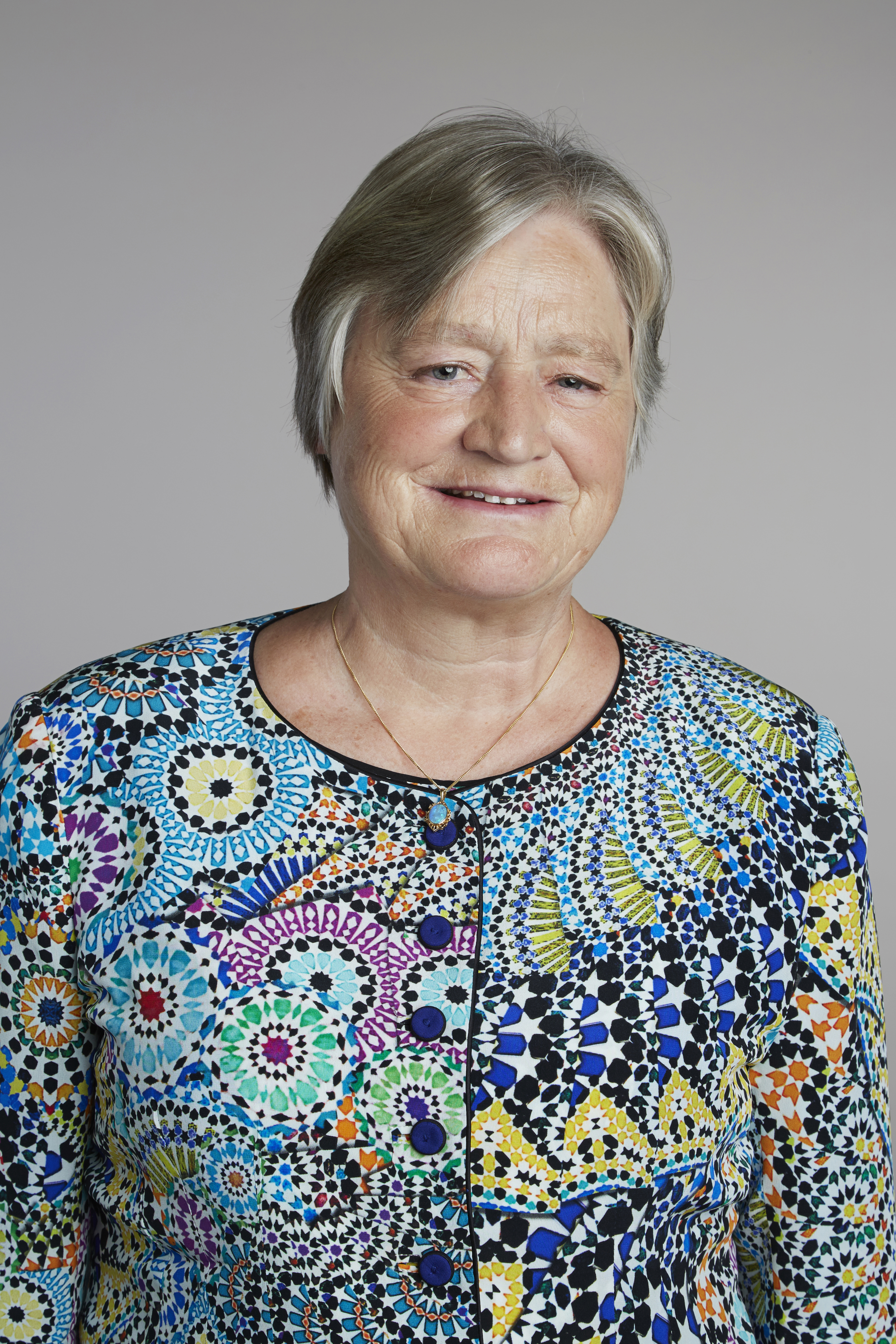
- Slingo at the Royal Society admissions day in London, July 2015
- Born: Julia Mary Walker; 13 December 1950 (age 75); Kenilworth, Warwickshire, England, UK
- Education: University of Bristol (BSc, PhD)
- Spouse: Anthony Slingo (m. 1978; died 2008)
- Children: Two daughters
- Awards: OBE (2008); DBE (2014); FRS (2015)
- Scientific career
- Fields: Meteorology; Climatology
- Workplaces: Met Office; University of Reading; ECMWF; National Center for Atmospheric Research (NCAR); National Centre for Atmospheric Science (NCAS); IPCC
- Thesis: Published work (1988)
- Website: met.reading.ac.uk/userpages/swssling.php

Julia Mary Slingo DBE, FRS, HonFInstP (née Walker; born 13 December 1950) is a British meteorologist and climate scientist. She was Chief Scientist at the Met Office from 2009 until 2016, becoming the first woman to hold the post. She is also a visiting professor in the Department of Meteorology at the University of Reading, where she held, prior to appointment to the Met Office, the positions of Director of Climate Research in the Natural Environment Research Council (NERC) National Centre for Atmospheric Science and founding director of the Walker Institute for Climate System Research.

From 2015 to 2016, she was one of the members of the High Level Group of Scientific Advisers of the European Commission Scientific Advice Mechanism, part of its Directorate-General for Research and Innovation.

== Early life and education ==
Julia Mary Walker was born on 13 December 1950 in Kenilworth, Warwickshire. She was educated at the King's High School for Girls, an all-girls private school in Warwick. She studied physics at the University of Bristol and graduated with a Bachelor of Science degree in 1973.

In 1988, she was awarded a Doctor of Philosophy (PhD) degree at the same university.

== Career and research ==
Following her degree, she joined the Met Office, where she became a Senior Scientist in the dynamical meteorology section. Her research focussed on clouds and their interactions with the rest of the atmosphere, and she pioneered new ways to represent clouds in weather forecast and climate models. In 1985, she left the Met Office and, after a year at the European Centre for Medium-Range Weather Forecasts (ECMWF) in Reading, UK, Dame Julia moved in 1986 to the National Center for Atmospheric Research (NCAR) in the USA. While at NCAR, she was awarded in 1989 a PhD in atmospheric physics from the University of Bristol, for a thesis completed through a series of published papers.

In 1990, Slingo returned to the UK, to join the Department of Meteorology at the University of Reading, where she founded a group researching into tropical climate. She became an established researcher in tropical climate variability and cumulus convection, its influence on the global climate, and its role in seasonal and decadal climate prediction, and led the development of a new generation of high resolution climate models. She developed a particular interest in the monsoons of India and China, working closely with scientists in both countries. More recently, she has also been investigating the impacts of changes on water resources and crop production, and the need to better represent the hydrological cycle in climate models. While at Reading, Dame Julia became the first female Professor of Meteorology in the UK, and was appointed to the leading role in the UK climate science community of Director of Climate Research in NERC's National Centre for Atmospheric Science (NCAS). In 2006, she founded the Walker Institute for Climate System Research at Reading, aimed at addressing the cross disciplinary challenges of climate change and its impacts.

As Chief Scientist at the Met Office, Slingo was responsible for providing scientific and technical strategy, ensuring that the organisation adheres to good scientific and technical standards, and for directing and managing research and development within the Met Office. She also represents the Office on science and technology across government.

In March 2012, Slingo said that a reduction in Arctic sea ice caused by climate change was possibly linked to colder and drier winter weather in the UK. In February 2014, she said that climate change is likely to be a factor in the storms and floods Britain had been experiencing for several months.

Her research has been funded by the Natural Environment Research Council (NERC).

=== Honours and awards ===
Slingo was appointed an Officer of the Order of the British Empire (OBE) in 2008 for services to environmental and climate science. She was promoted to Dame Commander of the Order of the British Empire (DBE) in the 2014 New Year Honours for services to weather and climate science.

Slingo was awarded the Buchan Prize of the Royal Meteorological Society in 1998. She was awarded honorary degrees of doctor of science by the University of Bristol in 2010, and the University of Reading in 2011. In 2022, she was honoured again by Bristol University, winning their Alumni Award for Lifetime Achievement.

In 2014, Slingo was named one of the 100 leading UK practising scientists by the Science Council. She was also elected a Fellow of the Royal Society (FRS) in 2015. The same year, she was awarded the International Meteorological Organization Prize from the World Meteorological Organization. Slingo was elected a member of the US National Academy of Engineering in 2016 "For contributions to modelling of the Earth's climate system and for leadership in the weather and climate community".

Slingo was the first female Professor of Meteorology in the UK. In 2008, she became the first woman President of the Royal Meteorological Society. She was interviewed on The Life Scientific by Jim Al-Khalili in 2014.

She was awarded the Carl-Gustaf Rossby Research Medal by the American Meteorological Society in 2020.

== Personal life ==
Slingo married Anthony Slingo in 1978. He was an environmental scientist who died in 2008. They had two daughters. She lives in Sidmouth in Devon.
