= Information art =

Art incorporating data or information

Information art, also known as data art and sometimes as informatism, is a genre of art that incorporates data or information as part of the work. It may draw on fields including mathematics, science, telecommunications, and digital technology, and may use found data or archived and manipulated information.

== Background ==
Kynaston McShine's Information

Information art developed alongside conceptual art and art-and-technology practices in the 1960s and 1970s. Art historian Edward A. Shanken has discussed the relationship between conceptual art and art and technology, noting that the two have often been treated separately in art history.

In 1970, Kynaston McShine curated Information at the Museum of Modern Art in New York. The exhibition included more than 150 artists from 15 countries and dealt with the dissemination, accessibility, and perception of information. MoMA describes it as the first survey of conceptual art in the United States and as one of its early exhibitions dealing with the impact of technology on art.

Experiments in Art and Technology (E.A.T.) was founded in New York in 1966 by engineers Billy Klüver and Fred Waldhauer and artists Robert Rauschenberg and Robert Whitman. The organization encouraged collaboration between artists and engineers and followed the 1966 performance series 9 Evenings: Theatre and Engineering.

== Contemporary practices ==
Information art uses data and information as artistic material. Sources may include photographs, census data, video clips, search engine results, and network signals. The Art & Architecture Thesaurus also includes the use of found, archived, or manipulated information, as well as methods associated with mathematics, science, telecommunications, and digital systems.

== See also ==
=== Examples ===
- The Tempestry Project
- Warming stripes
- Climate spiral

=== Related subjects ===
- Algorithmic art
- Climate change art
- Computer art
- Conceptual art
- Data visualization
- Digital art
- Experiments in Art and Technology
- Generative art
- Knowledge visualization
- Post-conceptual art
- Software art
- Systems art
- Systems thinking
