= Magdalena Titirici =

Romanian chemist

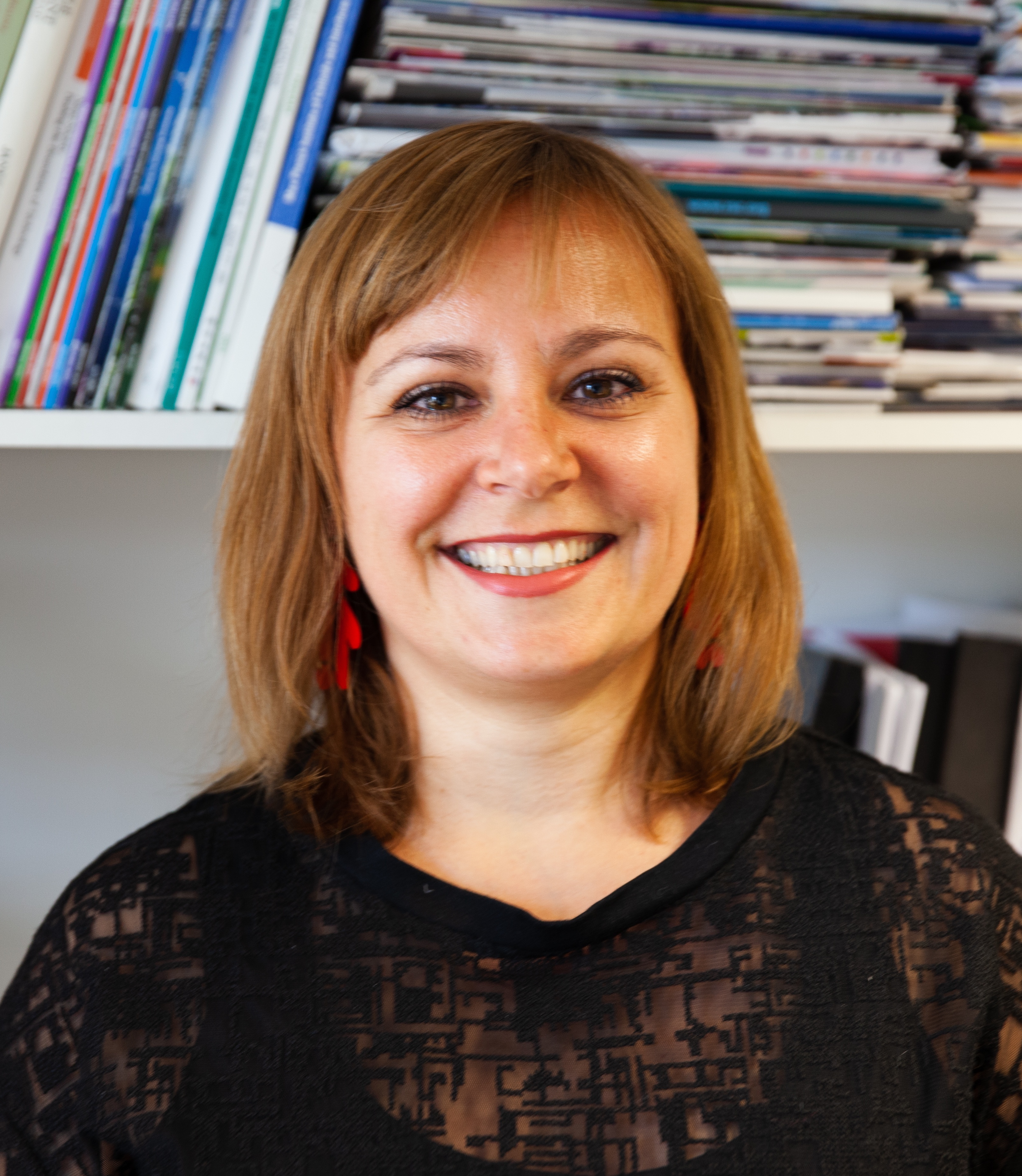
- Education: Johannes Gutenberg-Universität Mainz; University of Dortmund; University of Bucharest
- Awards: Corday-Morgan Prize; IOM3 Rosenhain Medal
- Scientific career
- Fields: Sustainable Chemistry
- Workplaces: Queen Mary University of London; Imperial College London
- Website: https://www.titiricigroup.com/

Magdalena (Magda) Titirici is a Professor of Sustainable Energy Materials at Imperial College London.

== Early life and education ==
Titirici studied chemistry at the University of Bucharest. She earned her PhD at the Technical University of Dortmund in 2005, working on molecularly imprinted polymers for her undergraduate studies. Titirici also worked at the Johannes Gutenberg University Mainz during her postgraduate studies. She then completed her postdoctoral studies at the Max Planck Institute of Colloids and Interfaces, where she then took on the job of group leader. She also received her habilitation in 2013 at the same university. Titirici joined Queen Mary University of London in 2013 as a Reader, before being promoted to Professor in 2014. In 2019 she moved to the Chemical Engineering Department of Imperial College London, leading a multidisciplinary and diverse research group in the field of Sustainable Energy Materials. She has been named Royal Academy of Engineering's Chair of Sustainable Energy Materials for Emerging Technologies, and will be funded over 10 years to develop renewable energy technologies.

== Research ==
Her group uses biomass and hydrothermal processes to create carbon products. She is interested in how these carbon nanomaterials produced by hydrothermal carbonisation (HTC) can be used in electrocatalytical reactions, including oxygen reduction and oxygen evolution. They also work on electrodes for energy storage in lithium and sodium ion batteries. She leads a large research group who work on several projects focused on sustainable materials. They have published over 130 publications in peer-reviewed scientific journals. She contributed to the book Global Sustainability: A Nobel Cause.

== Awards ==
- 2023- Imperial College President Award and Medal for Excellent Research Team
- 2021 - Royal Society Kavli Medal and Lecture
- 2021 – Institute of Materials, Minerals and Mining A. A. Griffith Medal and Prize
- 2018 – Royal Society of Chemistry Corday-Morgan Prize
- 2018 – Chinese Academy of Science President Fellowship
- 2017 – Universal Scientific Education and Research Network Laureate
- 2017 – Honorary Doctorate from Stockholm University
- 2016 – Institute of Materials, Minerals and Mining Rosenhain Medal
