= Landscape maintenance =

Maintaining health and looks of outdoor spaces

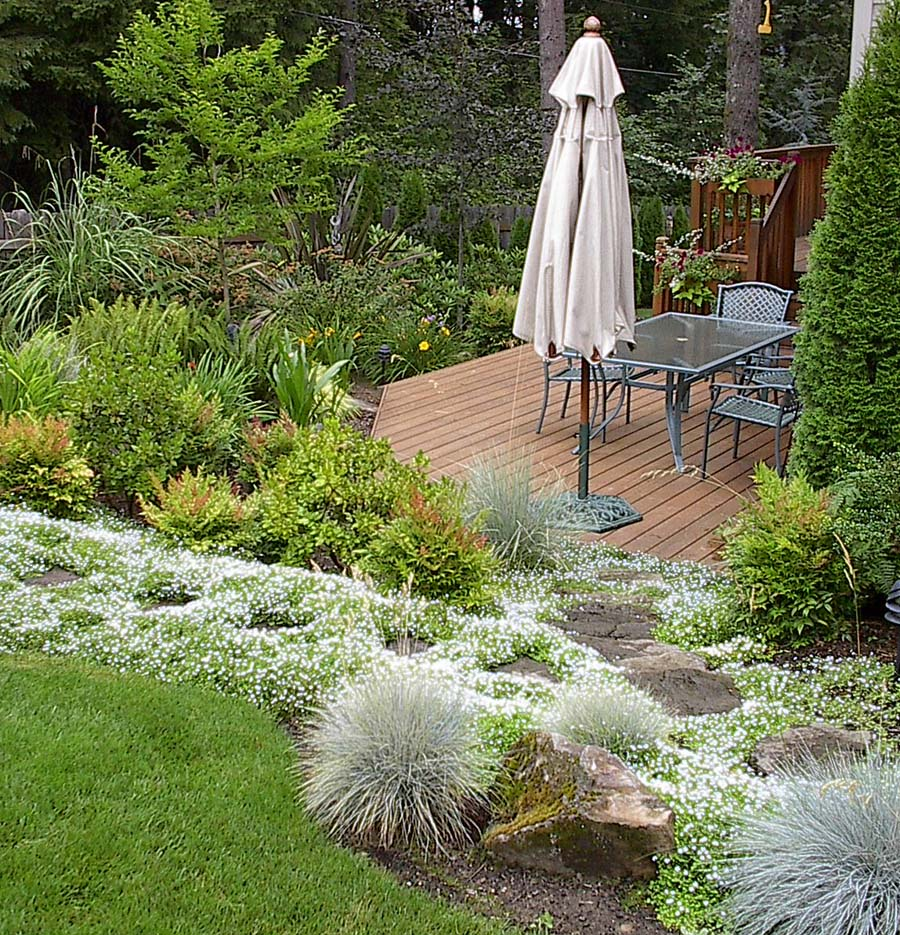
One example of a maintained landscape from Beaverton, Oregon

Landscape maintenance (or groundskeeping) is the art and vocation of keeping a landscape healthy, clean, safe and attractive, typically in a garden, yard, park, institutional setting or estate. Using tools, supplies, knowledge, physical exertion and skills, a groundskeeper may plan or carry out annual plantings and harvestings, periodic weeding and fertilizing, other gardening, lawn care, snow removal, driveway and path maintenance, shrub pruning, topiary, lighting, fencing, swimming pool care, runoff drainage, and irrigation, and other jobs for protecting and improving the topsoil, plants, and garden accessories.

Groundskeepers may also deal with local animals (including birds, rodents, reptiles, insects, and domestic animals or pets), and create means to attract or repel them, as desired or necessary. A garden may also be designed to include exotic animals, such as a koi pond. In larger estates, groundskeepers may be responsible for providing and maintaining habitat for wild animals.

== Landscape maintenance industry ==
According to IBISWorld, who published an article in September 2019 on the Landscape Industry in the US, the Landscaping Industry is worth $98.8 billion. From 2014-2019, the industry had an annual growth of 4.4%, but it is estimated that from 2019- 2024 the industry will decrease to only a 1.5% annual growth. The Industry is suspected to have a 1.2% growth in the number or businesses and low entry barriers for new companies. Due to the continuous and stead growth of this industry, competition for new businesses is high.

In May 2017, the U.S Bureau of Labor Statistics ( BLS ), estimated that 912,360 "Landscape and Groundskeeping Workers" maintained jobs under this job title. These workers have an average annual pay of $29,700 paired with a mean hourly wage of about $14.28. These jobs hold a variety of hourly rates ranging from $9.59, which equals an annual pay of $19,960 a year, to $20.61, which holds an annual pay of $42,870. The exact description of this job can change solely based on the company that has posted the job description, but according to the BLS, " Landscape or maintain grounds of property using hand or power tools or equipment. Workers typically perform a variety of tasks, which may include any combination of the following: sod laying, mowing, trimming, planting, watering, fertilizing, digging, raking, sprinkler installation, and installation of mortarless segmental concrete masonry wall units." The BLS also claims that this job title excludes "Farmworkers and Laborers, Crop, Nursery, and Greenhouse (45-2092)."

Demand for landscaping and pool installation work increased during the COVID-19 pandemic due to the increased number of remote workers spending time in their homes.

Landscape maintenance encompasses not only the routine upkeep of outdoor areas but also integrated property care solutions that enhance both aesthetics and functionality. For example, companies like KD Landscaping in Syracuse, New York, illustrate this broader approach by offering comprehensive property maintenance services. These services include landscape design and installation, drainage management, deck and fence construction, and other specialized repairs aimed at protecting property value and preventing damage. This integrated model ensures that landscapes are not only well-maintained but also resilient against environmental challenges, thereby contributing to long-term sustainability and enhanced curb appeal.

== See also ==
- Landscape architecture
- List of domesticated animals
- List of domesticated plants
- Property manager
