= Matthew Cappucci =

American meteorologist, reporter, storm chaser, and author

Matthew E. Cappucci (born 1997) is an American meteorologist, reporter, storm chaser, and author. He is a member of The Washington Post’s Capital Weather Gang and a frequent contributor to WAMU radio, NPR, and the BBC, among other media outlets.

== Early life and education ==
Cappucci was born and raised in Plymouth, Massachusetts, where he attended Indian Brook Elementary School and Plymouth South Middle School, both in Plymouth, Massachusetts. He became fascinated with weather after noticing—at a very young age—how anemometers would spin atop the roofs of buildings, seemingly without anything touching them, which led to an interest in wind and how it is measured. At age five, his father showed him a documentary on PBS about tornadoes, which further intensified his interest in weather.

Growing up outside Boston, he watched Harvey Leonard, the chief meteorologist at the time at WCVB-TV, the local ABC affiliate, and credits Leonard with providing an outlet for his enthusiasm related to weather, as well as inspiring him to pursue a career path incorporating both meteorology and communication.

Cappucci attended Sturgis Charter School in Hyannis, Massachusetts, where he graduated in 2015 with the highest grade point average of his class. While there, he delivered weather forecasts several times a week on local public access channels.

In 2013, at the age of 15, he presented a paper titled “Gust-Front Related Waterspouts” at the American Meteorological Society’s (AMS) 41st Conference on Broadcast Meteorology in Nashville, Tennessee. He is considered to have been the youngest presenter at an AMS conference.

Cappucci attended Harvard College, where he took part in the school’s special concentration program, which allows students, known as “concentrators,” to design their own degree program under the supervision of a faculty advisor. Cappucci worked with Professor Eric J. Heller of the Department of Physics in developing a special concentration in atmospheric sciences. The curriculum required Cappucci to take classes three days a week at M.I.T., where he estimates he took 25 to 30 percent of his meteorology classes. He graduated in 2019 as Harvard's first atmospheric science concentrator.

== Career ==
Cappucci began his career in July 2019, shortly after graduation, as a meteorologist and reporter for The Washington Post’s Capital Weather Gang, working under The Post’s weather editor, Jason Samenow. At the time he was announced as a full-time member of the team, Cappucci had already written more than 200 stories for the Capital Weather Gang.

In July 2021, Cappucci joined the weather team at WTTG-TV, the Fox affiliate in Washington, D.C., as a weekend meteorologist. In 2023, the Federal Alliance for Safe Homes named him as the recipient of its annual Weather Person of the Year award. Cappucci left the station in November 2023.

In August 2021, Cappucci began working for weather app MyRadar, where he currently serves as senior meteorologist.

== Storm chasing ==
Cappucci is an avid storm chaser and traveler and logged more than 100,000 miles traveling during his senior year at Harvard. In 2021, he wrote a detailed timeline of what a “typical” chase scenario looks like, noting that “in the world of storm chasing, there’s no such thing as typical."

== Books ==
Cappucci has written two books. Looking Up: The True Adventures of a Storm-Chasing Weather Nerd was published in 2023 by Pegasus Books and distributed by Simon & Schuster. It is a memoir that follows Cappucci's journey from a self-proclaimed “weather nerd” growing up to his time at Harvard to embarking on a career in meteorology. The book has been translated into Chinese and published by CITIC Press.

In 2024, Cappucci wrote Extreme Weather for Kids: Lessons and Activities All About Hurricanes, Tornadoes, Blizzards, and More! The book, illustrated by Stephanie Hathaway, was published by Quarry Books, an imprint of The Quarto Group.

== Personal life ==
Cappucci lives in Alexandria, Virginia. He has spoken at length about his love for the Waffle House chain of restaurants, including the fact that they tend to always be open, which is consistent with the chain's reputation and popularity among storm chasers, as exemplified in the Waffle House Index concept. In 2024, Cappucci started his Private Pilot flight training at Potomac Airfield (ICAO code KVKX).
