= Ed Hawkins (climatologist) =

British climate scientist known for data visualization graphics

Ed Hawkins MBE FRMetS
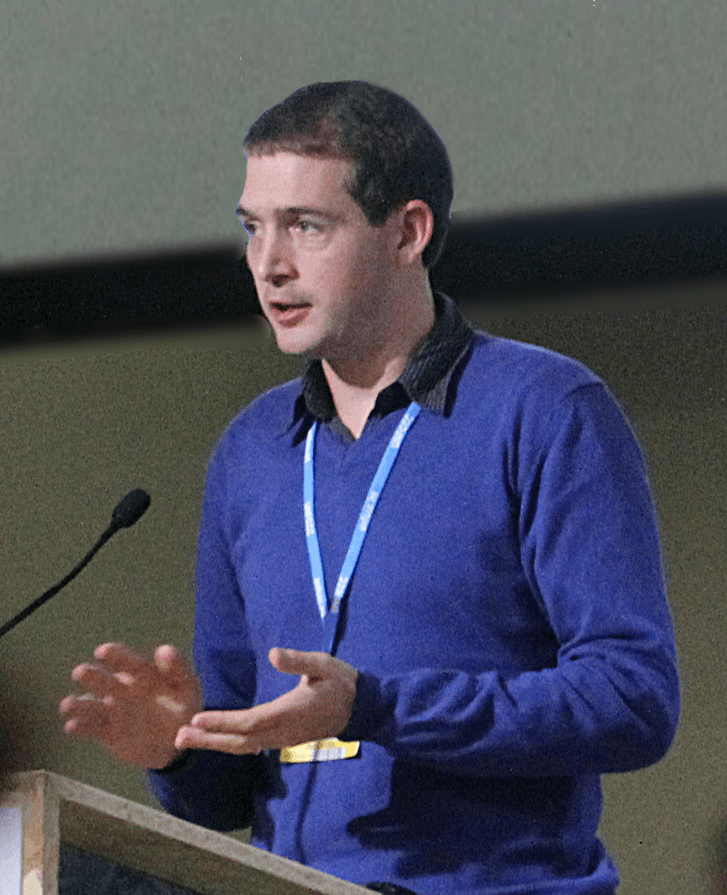
- Hawkins in 2015
- Born: Edward Hawkins; February 1977 (age 49)
- Education: University of Nottingham (PhD)
- Known for: Warming stripes Climate spirals
- Awards: Kavli Medal (2018); MBE (2019)
- Scientific career
- Fields: Climate variability Climate predictability Climate change Arctic; Astrophysics; Data and information visualization
- Workplaces: University of Reading; National Centre for Atmospheric Science
- Thesis: Galaxy clustering in large redshift surveys (2003)
- Doctoral advisor: Steve Maddox
- Website: edhawkins.org

Edward Hawkins (born 1977) is a British climate scientist who is Professor of climate science at the University of Reading, principal research scientist at the National Centre for Atmospheric Science (NCAS), editor of Climate Lab Book blog and lead scientist for the Weather Rescue citizen science project. He is known for his data visualizations of climate change for the general public such as warming stripes and climate spirals.

== Education ==
Hawkins was educated at the University of Nottingham where he was awarded a PhD in astrophysics in 2003 for research supervised by Steve Maddox that investigated galaxy clustering in large redshift surveys.

== Career and research ==
After his PhD, Hawkins served as a Natural Environment Research Council (NERC) advanced research fellow in the department of meteorology at the University of Reading from 2005 to 2013.

One of Hawkins' early warming stripes graphics shows global warming from 1850 (left side of graphic) to 2018 (right side of graphic). Being a "minimalist graphic stripped (of) unnecessary clutter", warming stripes portray observed global warming with blue stripes (cooler years) progressing to predominantly red stripes (warmer years).

Climate spiral shows global warming since 1850 as an ever-widening coloured spiral

As of 2025 Hawkins is a professor of climate science at the University of Reading, where he serves as academic lead for public engagement and is affiliated with the National Centre for Atmospheric Science (NCAS). He is a lead for Weather Rescue and Rainfall Rescue, citizen science projects in which volunteers transcribe data from historical meteorological and rainfall records for digital analysis.

Hawkins was a contributing author for the IPCC Fifth Assessment Report (2014) and was a lead author for the IPCC Sixth Assessment Report in 2021.

On 9 May 2016, Hawkins published his climate spiral data visualization graphic, which was widely reported as having gone viral. The climate spiral was widely praised, Jason Samenow writing in The Washington Post that the spiral graph was "the most compelling global warming visualization ever made".

On 22 May 2018, Hawkins published his warming stripes data visualization graphic, which has been used by meteorologists in Climate Central's annual #MetsUnite campaign to raise public awareness of global warming during broadcasts on the summer solstice. Similarly, on 17 June 2019, Hawkins launched the #ShowYourStripes initiative—in which the public could freely download and share graphics customized to specific countries or localities—which was supported by the World Meteorological Organization, Climate Central, and Climate Without Borders. The graphic became displayed in numerous public spaces such as Times Square and White Cliffs of Dover, in a US House committee logo, and in a MoMA art museum exhibit.

== Honours and awards ==
Hawkins' climate spiral design was on the shortlist for the Kantar Information is Beautiful Awards 2016, the design having been featured in the opening ceremony of the August 2016 Summer Olympics in Rio de Janeiro.

Hawkins was awarded the Royal Meteorological Society's Climate Science Communication Prize in 2017.

In 2018, Hawkins was awarded the Kavli Medal by the Royal Society "for significant contributions to understanding and quantifying natural climate variability and long-term climate change, and for actively communicating climate science and its various implications with broad audiences".

In July 2019, Hawkins was included in the Climate Home News list of ten climate influencers.

Hawkins was appointed Member of the Order of the British Empire (MBE) in the 2020 New Year Honours "For services to Climate Science and to Science Communication".

In June 2021, Hawkins was named in The Sunday Times "Green Power List" which profiled twenty environmentalists in the UK who are "minds engaging with the world's biggest problem".

In May 2024, Hawkins received the Royal Geographical Society's Geographical Engagement Award for his work in developing warming stripes.

In 2025, he was made an honorary fellow of Trinity College Dublin.

=== Selected publications ===
According to Google Scholar his most highly cited publications include:

- The Potential to Narrow Uncertainty in Regional Climate Predictions
- The 2dF Galaxy Redshift Survey: correlation functions, peculiar velocities and the matter density of the Universe
- Decadal Prediction: Can It Be Skillful?
- Global risk of deadly heat
