= Margaret Brown (mathematics educator) =

British mathematics educator

Margaret Louise Brown OBE is a British mathematics educator known for her research on numeracy and the learning stages of mathematics. She is an emeritus professor of mathematics education at King's College London, the former head of the School of Education at King's College London, the former president of the British Educational Research Association, , the former director of Graded Assessment in Mathematics (GAIM), the former chair of the trustees of the School Mathematics Project, and the former president of the Mathematical Association.

== Education and career ==
Brown was a secondary school teacher of mathematics in the 1960s before becoming a lecturer at Chelsea College, now part of King's College London. After the 1985 merge of Chelsea and King's College London, she headed the School of Education from 1992 to 1996. She was president of the Mathematical Association in 1990, and president of the British Educational Research Association for 1997–1998.

== Recognition ==
Brown won the 2013 Kavli Medal "for her significant impact on mathematics education within the UK". She was made an Officer of the Order of the British Empire in the 2015 New Year Honours.
