= Kavli Medal =

Award of the Royal Society

- Hosted by: Royal Society

The Kavli Medal is the name of two medals awarded biennially by the Royal Society. The medal and lectureship are supported by the Kavli Foundation (United States).

== Royal Society Kavli Medal ==
The Royal Society Kavli Medal is awarded biennially, in odd years, for outstanding achievement in science and engineering in the fields of environment or energy. It is aimed at career stage scientists who have undertaken no more than 15 years of research work since gaining their PhD.

The recipient should be a citizen of a Commonwealth country or of the Irish Republic or who have lived and worked there for a minimum of three years immediately prior to their nomination. The winner of the award receives a medal of gilt bronze and a personal gift of £500. The winner is invited to deliver a public lecture on their research at the Society.

The recipient is chosen by the Council of the Royal Society on the recommendation of the Joint Physical and Biological Sciences Awards Committee. Nominations are valid for five years after which the candidate cannot be re-nominated until a year after the nomination has expired.

=== Winners ===
- 2011: Clare Grey, Solid state NMR uses in the field of lithium-ion batteries
- 2013: Neil Greenham, In recognition of his exceptional work on hybrid materials combining polymer semiconductors with inorganic nanoparticles, and their use in printable solar cells
- 2015: Matt King, for his research in field glaciology leading to the first reconciled estimate of ice sheet contribution to sea level
- 2017: Henry Snaith, for his discovery and development of highly efficient perovskite solar cells
- 2019: Ed Hawkins, for his significant contributions to understanding and quantifying natural climate variability and long-term climate change, and for actively communicating climate science and its various implications with broad audiences.
- 2020 Ian Chapman, for his scientific insight that has illuminated the complex physics of confined plasmas and prepared the way for fusion burn
- 2021: Magdalena Titirici, for her outstanding contributions to advancing the sustainability of energy storage and conversion technologies by performing interdisciplinary research at the interface between electrochemistry, materials science and chemical engineering

== Kavli Education Medal ==
The Kavli Education Medal is awarded biennially, in even years, to 'an individual who has made a significant impact on science or mathematics education within the UK'.

=== Laureates ===
- 2010: Celia Hoyles DBE FAcSS FIMAin recognition of her outstanding contribution to research in mathematics education
- 2012: Margaret Brown OBE in recognition of her significant impact on mathematics education within the UK
- 2014: Sir John Holman FRSC CChem in recognition of his significant impact on science education within the UK
- 2016: Becky Parker, MBE for founding the Langton Star Centre for school children
- 2018: Alice Rogers, OBE for her outstanding contributions to mathematics education
- 2020: Simon Humphreys, for his transformative contribution to computing education, influencing both national policy and the lives of thousands of practicing school teachers
