= Celia Hoyles =

British mathematician

Dame Celia Hoyles DBE FAcSS FIMA
- Celia Hoyles at St Pancras railway station, London in 2016
- Born: Celia Mary French; 18 May 1946 (age 80)
- Education: University of Manchester (BSc); University of London (PGCE, MEd, PhD)
- Spouses: Martin Hoyles (divorced); Richard Noss (m. 1996)
- Awards: Kavli Medal (2010); IMA Gold Medal (2026)
- Scientific career
- Fields: Mathematics education; Mathematics policy; Applied mathematics
- Workplaces: University College London
- Thesis: Factors in school learning - the pupils' view : a study with particular reference to mathematics (1980)
- Website: iris.ucl.ac.uk/iris/browse/profile?upi=CMHOY46

Professor Dame Celia Mary Hoyles DBE FAcSS FIMA (née French; born 18 May 1946) is a British mathematician, educationalist and Professor of Mathematics Education at University College London (UCL), in the Institute of Education (IoE).

== Early life and education ==
Celia Mary French was born on 18 May 1946. She was educated at the University of Manchester where she graduated with a first class degree in mathematics from the Department of Mathematics in 1967. She subsequently completed a Postgraduate Certificate in Education (PGCE) in 1971, and a Master of Education degree (MEd) in 1973. She completed a Doctor of Philosophy (PhD) degree in 1980, with a thesis on factors in learning mathematics. All her degrees are from the University of London.

== Career and research ==
Hoyles began her career as a secondary school teacher, later becoming an academic. In the late 1980s she was co-presenter of Fun and Games, a prime time television quiz show about mathematics. With Arthur Bakker, Phillip Kent, and Richard B. Noss she is the co-author of Improving Mathematics at Work: The Need for Techno-Mathematical Literacies.

Hoyles served as president of the Institute of Mathematics and its Applications (IMA) from 2014 to 2015. She served as chief adviser for mathematics to the government of the United Kingdom from 2004 to 2007 and as director of the National Centre for Excellence in the Teaching of Mathematics (NCETM) from 2007 to 2013.

=== Awards and honours ===
In the 2004 New Year Honours, Hoyles was appointed Officer of the Order of the British Empire (OBE) 'for services to education'. In the 2014 New Year Honours, she was appointed Dame Commander of the Order of the British Empire (DBE) in recognition of her service as director of the National Centre for Excellence in the Teaching of Mathematics. She is a Fellow of the Academy of Social Sciences (FAcSS).

In 2003, she was awarded the first Hans Freudenthal medal by the International Commission on Mathematical Instruction (ICMI) in recognition of 'the outstanding contribution that [she] has made to research in the domain of technology and mathematics education'. In 2010, she was awarded the first Kavli Education Medal by the Royal Society 'in recognition of her outstanding contribution to research in mathematics education'.

Hoyles has honorary degrees from the Open University (2006), Loughborough University (2008), Sheffield Hallam University (2011) and University of Bath (2019).

== Personal life ==
Her first marriage was to Martin Hoyles: their marriage ended in divorce. In 1996, she married Richard Noss, Professor of Mathematics Education at University College London. Her second marriage brought two step children.
