= Weather and Society Integrated Studies =

WAS*IS Logo

Weather and Society Integrated Studies (WAS*IS) is an international movement that is changing the weather enterprise by integrating social science into meteorological research and practice. WAS*IS was formed to build an interdisciplinary community of practitioners, researchers and decision makers collaborating to effectively understand how to improve weather warnings, incorporate societal impacts into weather forecasts, and use social science tools and methods. WAS*IS is changing the culture from what WAS to what IS the future of integrated studies.

WAS*IS has 276 representatives from the United States, Canada, China, France, Germany, Australia, New Zealand, Finland, the Netherlands, and numerous Caribbean countries. WAS*ISers come from many parts of the weather enterprise, including meteorology, emergency management, hydrology, geography, climatology, psychology, sociology, economics, ecology, education and anthropology. Workshops were held in Boulder, Colorado on August 8–15, 2008, August 6–14, 2009, August 5–13, 2010, and August 4–12, 2011. An advanced workshop was held in Norman, Oklahoma September 15–17, 2008. The first WAS*IS Caribbean was held June 6–10, 2010 in San Juan, Puerto Rico.

== History ==
WAS*IS was established in 2005 at the National Center for Atmospheric Research (NCAR) located in Boulder, Colorado. WAS*IS was founded by Dr. Eve Gruntfest, a geographer at the University of Colorado at Colorado Springs, and Julie Demuth, an atmospheric scientist at NCAR, as part of NCAR's Societal Impacts Program. Dr. Gruntfest was inspired by the comments of physical scientists she met during her career who were interested in integrating meteorology and social science but were unsure how to do the work, and did not know anyone else involved in societal impacts research or practice.

WAS*IS has received support from the US Weather Research Program, the National Oceanic and Atmospheric Administration NOAA, NCAR's Societal Impacts Program, the University of Colorado at Colorado Springs, and NCAR's Institute for the Study of Society and Environment. Additional workshop support has come from the University of Oklahoma, Monash University Sustainability Institute, ARC Network for Earth System Science, Australian Bureau of Meteorology, and Emergency Management Australia.
