= Alice Rogers =

Emeritus professor of mathematics at King's College London

Alice Rogers OBE

Academic background
- Education: Murray Edwards College, Cambridge, Imperial College London

Academic work
- Discipline: Mathematics
- Institutions: King's College London

Frances Alice Rogers OBE is a British mathematician and mathematical physicist. She is an emeritus professor of mathematics at King's College London.

== Research ==
Rogers' research concerns mathematical physics and more particularly supermanifolds, generalizations of the manifold concept based on ideas coming from supersymmetry. She is the author of the book Supermanifolds: Theory and Applications (World Scientific, 2007).

== Service ==
Rogers has been a member of the British government's Advisory Committee on Mathematics Education, is the education secretary of the London Mathematical Society (LMS), and represents the LMS on the Joint Mathematical Council of the UK.

== Education ==
Rogers studied mathematics in New Hall, Cambridge, in the 1960s. Her mother had also studied mathematics at Cambridge in the 1930s and later became a wartime code-breaker at Bletchley Park. Rogers earned her Ph.D. in 1981 from Imperial College London.

== Recognition ==
In 2016, she was appointed as an Officer of the Order of the British Empire "for services to Mathematics Education and Higher Education".

In 2018, Rogers was awarded the Kavli Education Medal for "her outstanding contributions to mathematics education" from The Royal Society.
