= Jason Samenow =

American journalist

- Education: University of Virginia; University of Wisconsin–Madison College of Letters and Science
- Occupations: meteorologist, journalist

Jason Samenow is an American meteorologist and weather journalist. He is the weather editor for The Washington Post.

== Early life and education ==
Samenow is a native of Washington, D.C. area, growing up in the Lake Barcroft community of Falls Church, Virginia.

He attended Fairfax County public schools and then the Potomac School, from which he graduated in 1994. As a high school student, Samenow was an intern for Bob Ryan, the chief meteorologist of WRC-TV (NBC4), who became an important mentor to him.

Samenow graduated from the University of Virginia in 1998 with a degree in environmental science with a focus in atmospheric science. He earned his M.S. in atmospheric science from the University of Wisconsin–Madison in 2000.

== Career ==
Samenow worked as a climate change analyst at the U.S. Environmental Protection Agency's Climate Change Division from 2000 to September 2010. Samenow launched and oversaw the EPA's public website on climate change.

In early 2004, Samenow established CapitalWeather.com, the Internet's first professional weather blog. Samenow began as the blog's only contributor, but it grew to feature over a dozen contributors by 2009.

The Washington Post absorbed the blog in 2008; the blog's writers became the "Capital Weather Gang" (of which Samenow serves as leader) and Samenow became weather editor and chief meteorologist for the Post. The Capital Weather Gang experienced a surge in public interest during the so-called "Snowmageddon" (the February 5–6, 2010 North American blizzard).

At The Washington Post, Samenow and the Capital Weather Gang frequently write not only about everyday weather patterns, but also about climate science. Samenow states that the groups tries to "do our best to accurately and fairly convey the latest, peer-reviewed scientific findings and the range of credible viewpoints."

In addition to his work on the Post, Samenow (and other Capital Weather Gang reporters) appear on WAMU (88.5 FM) for weather radio broadcasts.

== Memberships and honors ==
Samenow was named 2010 "Climate Change Communicator of the Year" by the George Mason University's Center for Climate Change Communication (4C), sharing the honor with BBC World Service Trust. The Center cited Samenow's work at the EPA.

Samenow served as a chairman of the D.C. Chapter of the American Meteorological Society. He has the "Digital Seal of Approval" from the National Weather Association. He is fellow of the Weather and Society Integrated Studies project.

== See also ==
- Matthew Cappucci
