= Professional Grounds Management Society =

The Professional Grounds Management Society (PGMS) is an individual membership society of grounds professionals advancing the grounds management profession through education and professional development in the United States.

PGMS was officially created in 1911 but the nucleus of the organization began as the National Association of Gardeners in suburban New York and New Jersey in 1905.

== Background ==
In 1911 all institutional grounds managers were invited to join the organization. Since then, broadening of the Society has continued. The unique core of the Society would be the institutional grounds professional generalist the organization would remain a professional society for the individual (rather than a trade association). The majority of PGMS members are institutional grounds managers who work for organizations such as colleges and universities, municipalities, park and recreation facilities, office parks, apartment complexes, hotels/motels, cemeteries, theme parks, etc. In addition, many independent landscape contractors are also in membership. All have joined for the purpose of education and economic advancement.

The society defines a grounds manager as a member of a management team responsible for the operation and maintenance of a site or sites. The grounds manager is responsible for the management of staff, money, materials and equipment utilized in maintaining and enhancing a landscaped site including turf, trees, woody ornamentals and flowers, outdoor structure and related facilities. This can include areas such as roads, sidewalks, parking lots maintenance and repair (including snow removal).

The ultimate goals are to assist the individual manager in developing techniques and management skills to assure an outstanding grounds management program for his or her organization, clients or employers and upgrade the level of the profession.

== Benefits ==
Key membership benefits include: Annual conference and Green Industry Expo, bi-monthly newsletter, membership certificate, certification programs (Certified Grounds Manager and Groundskeeper Certification), free educational manuals, local branch meetings, online membership directory, site awards, free industry magazine subscriptions, etc.

In keeping with its education orientation, PGMS also has student memberships, and sponsors annual scholarships for high school and college students studying in fields pertinent to horticulture and other grounds related fields.

== Requirements ==
- Being a member of the appropriate membership organization or organizations.
- Attending educational conferences in the field.
- Reading industry publications.
- Becoming certified at the level a member wishes to operate.

== PGMS published guides ==
- Grounds Maintenance Estimating Guideline
- Grounds Maintenance Management Guideline
- Grounds Management Forms & Job Description Guide

== Other Key facts About PGMS ==
- It is the only membership organization for institutional grounds managers.
- It is the only membership organization serving the breadth of the service arm of the Green Industry which professionals can join as individuals.
- It is the oldest individual membership organization for grounds professionals.

== See also ==
- Category:Sustainable technologies
