= Line marker (sports) =

Sports equipment

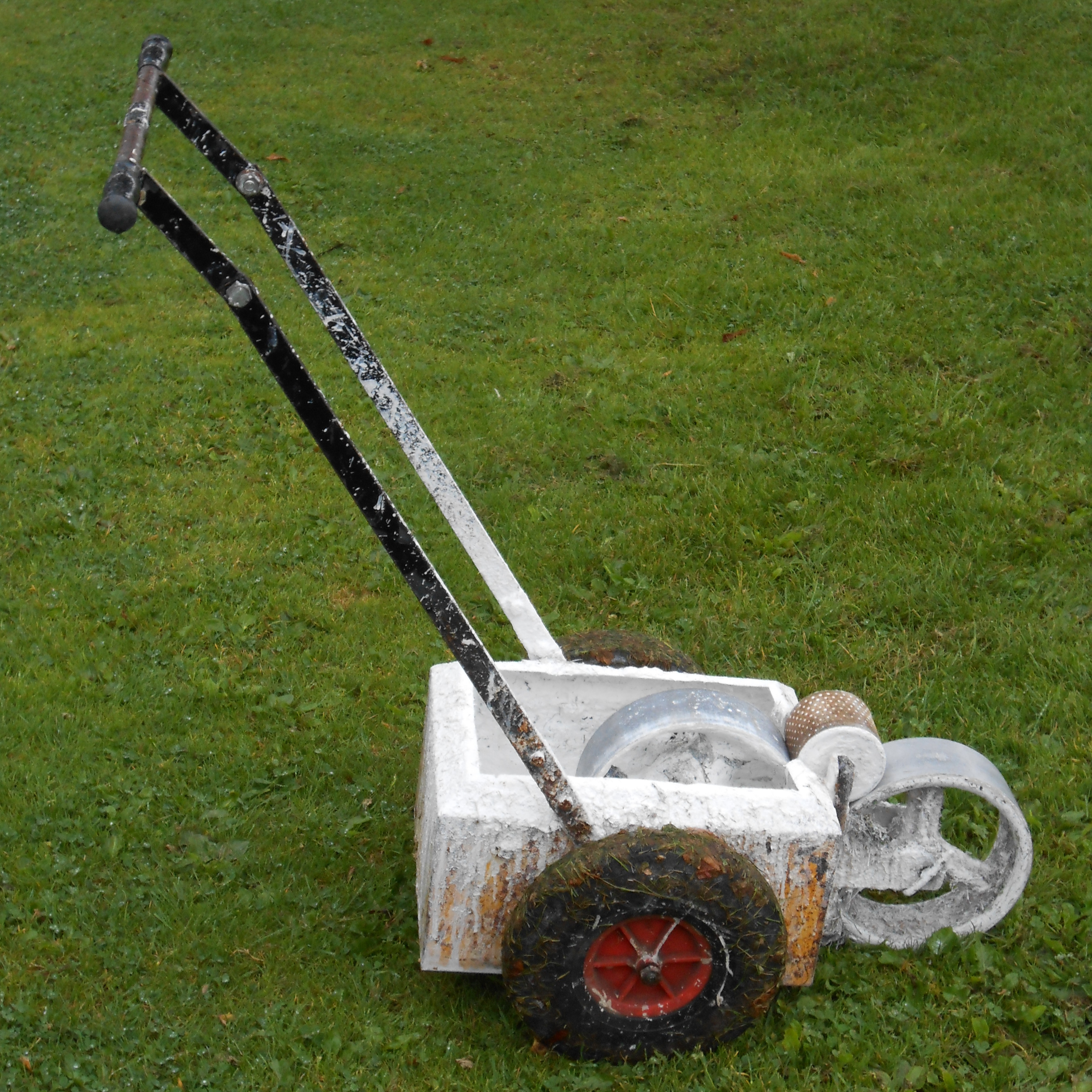
Transfer wheel line marker

A line marker is a device or machine with which lines or markings are drawn on a sports field or pitch. They were originally developed to mark out lawn tennis courts on grass, but later also became used in many other sports with outdoor pitches. The marked lines are often white, but may be any color. A variety of devices have been used, some of them now being robotically controlled.

== History ==
Basic line marking machines for turf were available by the late 1800s. They were originally developed for use on lawn tennis courts. One of the first such machines, a wheel-to-wheel paint transfer device, was developed by F.H. Ayres and "would be instantly recognizable by users of many of today's machines, which work on the same principle".

Some of the earliest line marking machines were built on a small scale so they could be used by a child, as the "gardener's boy" who was in charge of marking tennis courts on estates in the late 19th century might have been nine or ten years old.

=== In baseball ===
When baseball was first invented there were no marks on the field; foul lines were marked by using a plough to dig along the line. As the game progressed, the ploughed lines would become indistinct from repeated foot traffic, making calls difficult and causing disputes.

The use of whitewashed or chalked lines was developed by William Wing, a Cincinnati Red Stockings groundskeeper. In 1860 the foul lines, from home plate to first and third bases but not extending beyond, were the first lines marked with whitewash or chalk so as to be clearly seen by the umpire.

== Devices ==
Devices for marking lines include types using wheel-to-wheel transfer, wheel-and-gravity feed, belt feed, and gravity feed. Later developments used professionally include pressure pump systems. Major League Baseball recommends a line marker as essential equipment for maintaining baseball and softball fields.

In the 2010s, companies began developing completely robotic line markers which use GPS input to navigate, intended to eliminate the need for a human to operate the machine or direct the location of the lines being laid.

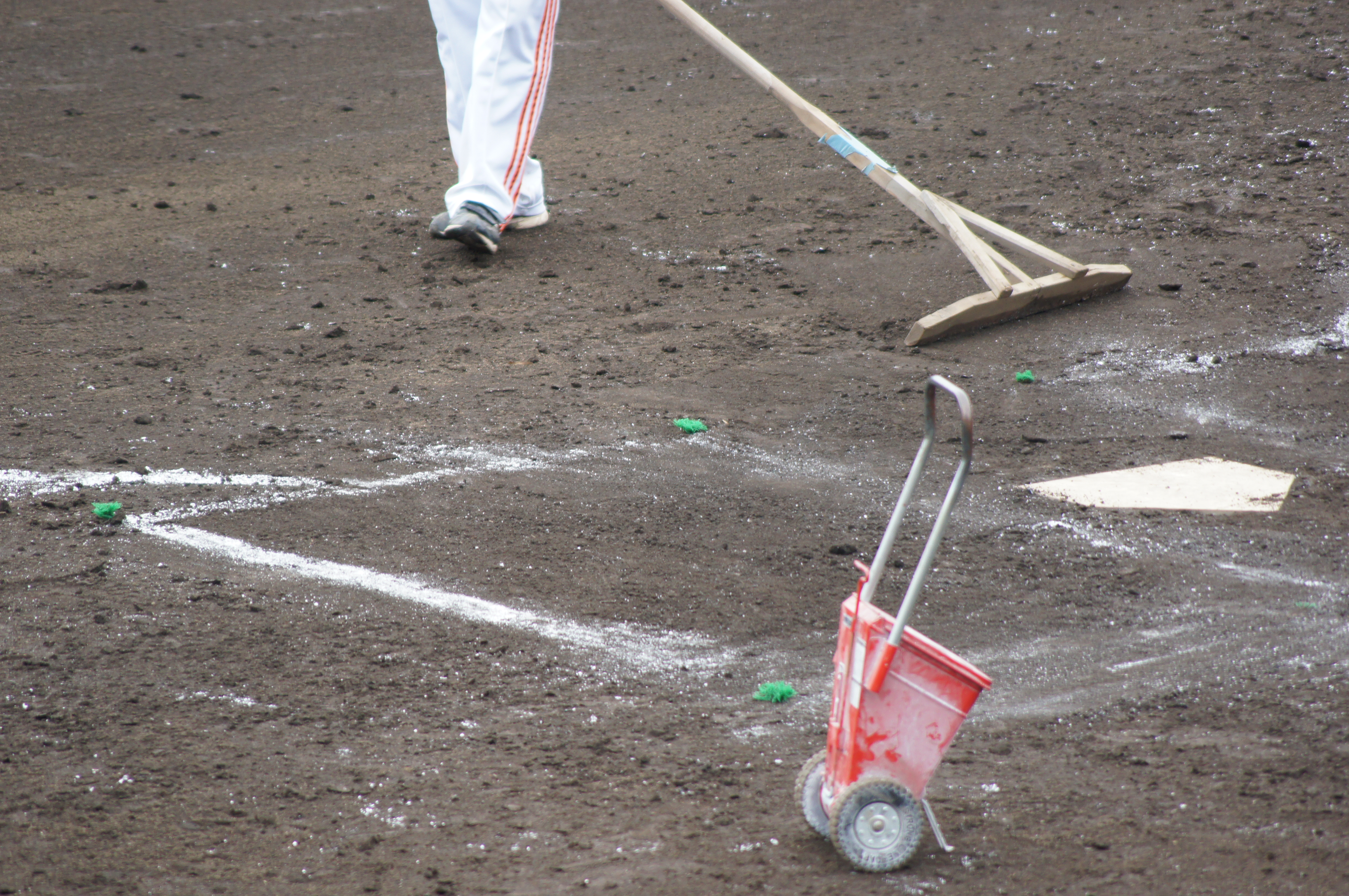
Line marker with lines needing repair

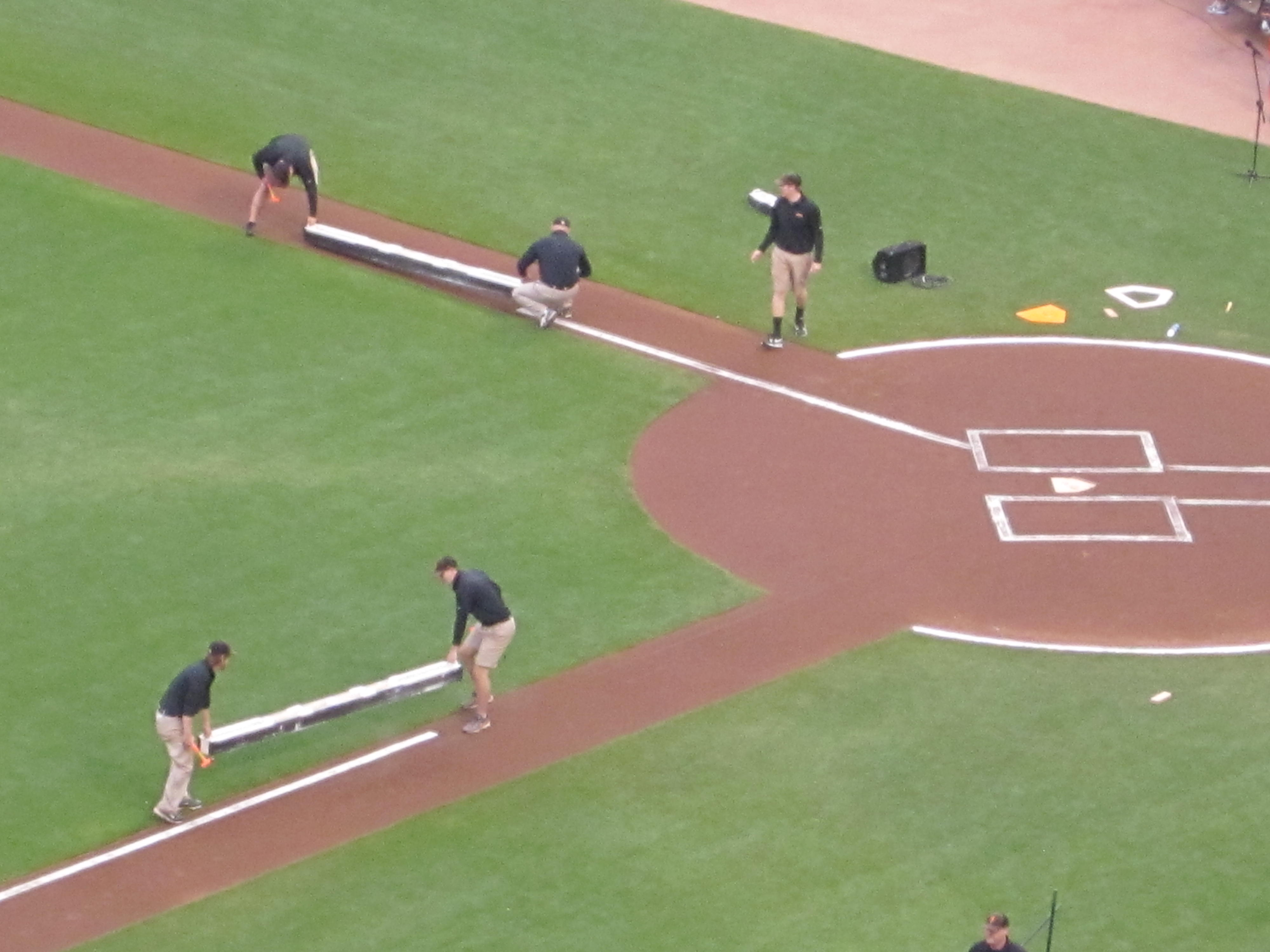
Marking lines

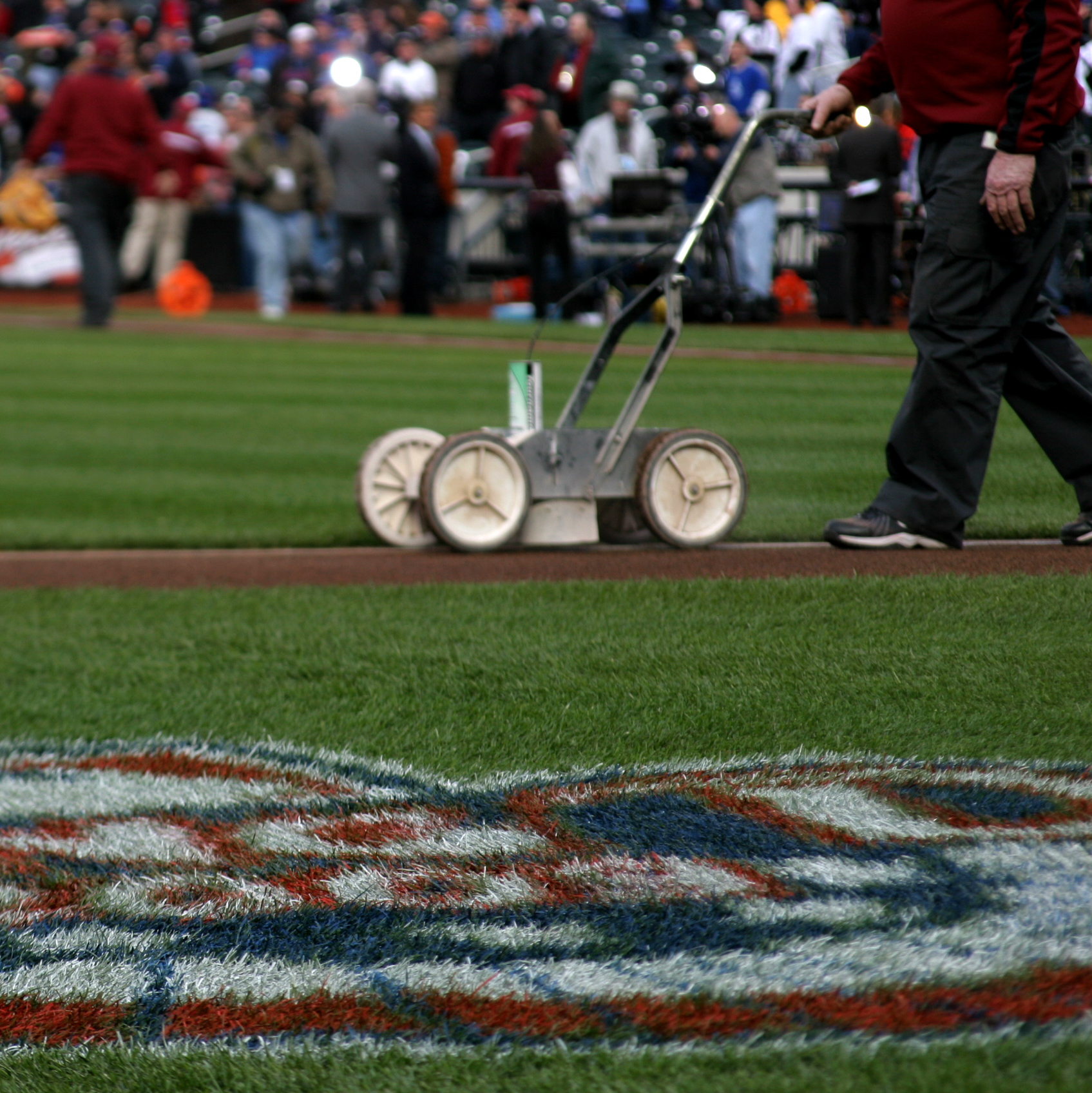
Line marker in use

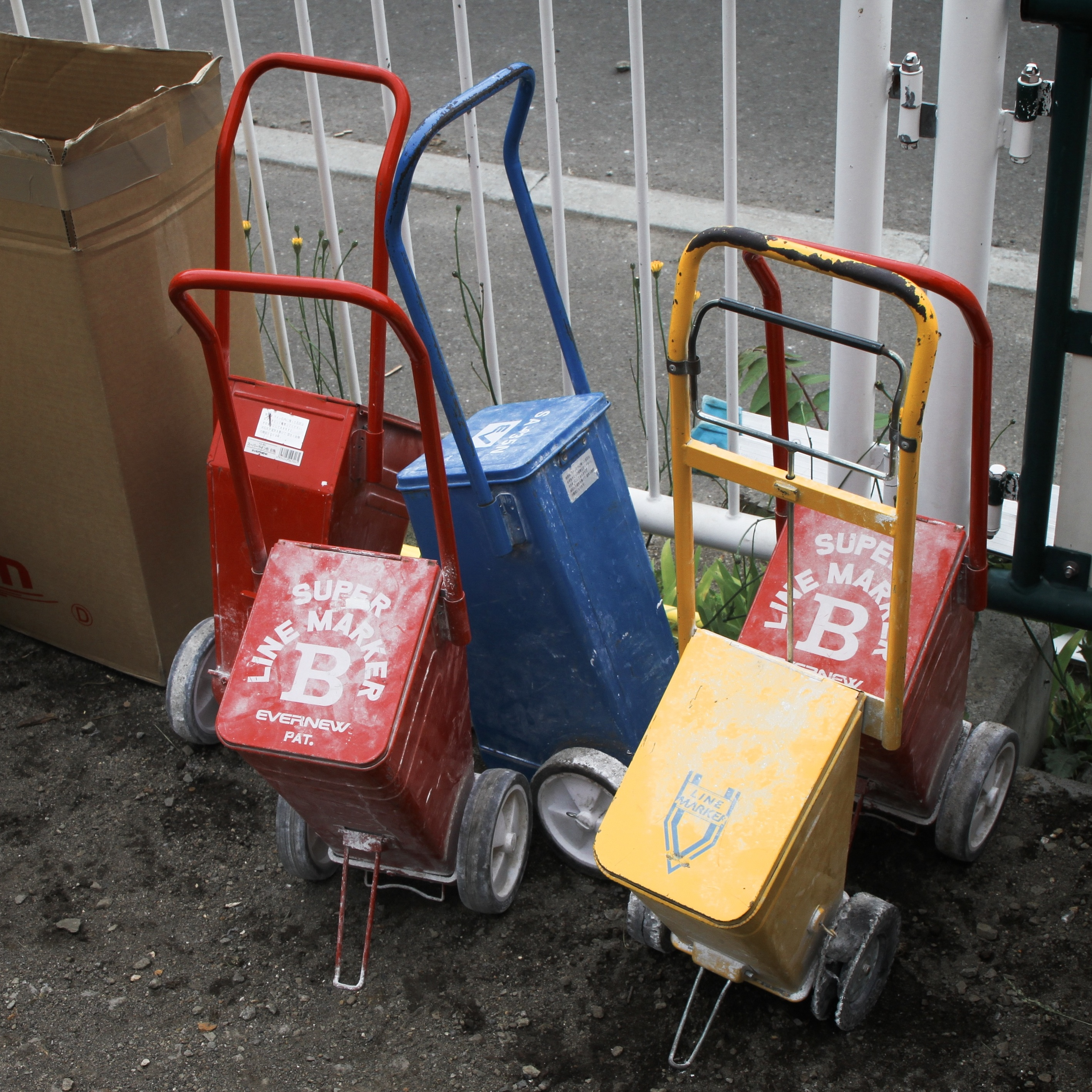
Dry line markers

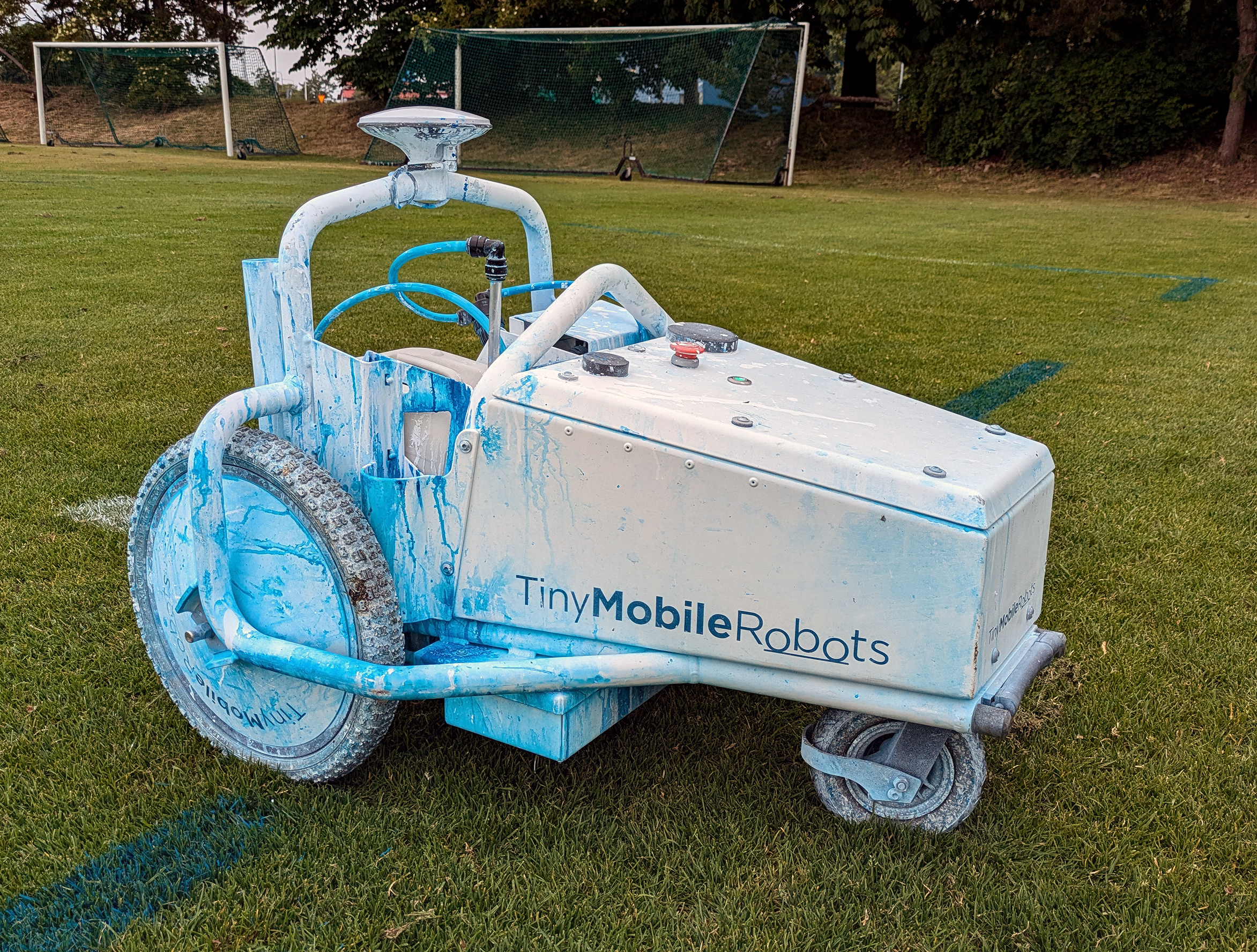
Robotic line marker

== Materials ==
Lines are marked by applying a very light or very dark material which will stand out against green turf, dirt, clay, or flooring. Materials used to mark lines include or have in the past included sawdust, hydrated lime, creosote, chalk (sometimes referred to as whiting), tape, paint, and various proprietary materials.

=== On turf ===
By 1994, both hydrated lime and creosote were no longer recommended due to safety concerns. Sawdust was being used only occasionally by 1994. Chalk or whiting was also losing popularity by 1994, as it did not last well and encouraged weed growth.

Proprietary marking solutions, sometimes mixed with chalk or whiting, are considered semi-permanent on turf. Proprietary dry line materials consist of a binder compound combined with a dry aggregate, can be applied to wet or dry surfaces, and are semi-permanent.

=== On hard surfaces ===
Tape and paints are primarily used on hard surfaces. Proprietary marking solutions can also be used on hard surfaces.

== See also ==
- Professional Grounds Management Society
- Sports Turf Research Institute
