= National Centre for Atmospheric Science =

Research institute at the University of Leeds

- Abbreviation: NCAS
- Formation: 2002
- Legal status: Government Organisation
- Headquarters: Leeds
- Region served: United Kingdom
- Executive Director: Professor Stephen Mobbs
- Parent organization: Natural Environment Research Council
- Budget: £30 million
- Website: ncas.ac.uk

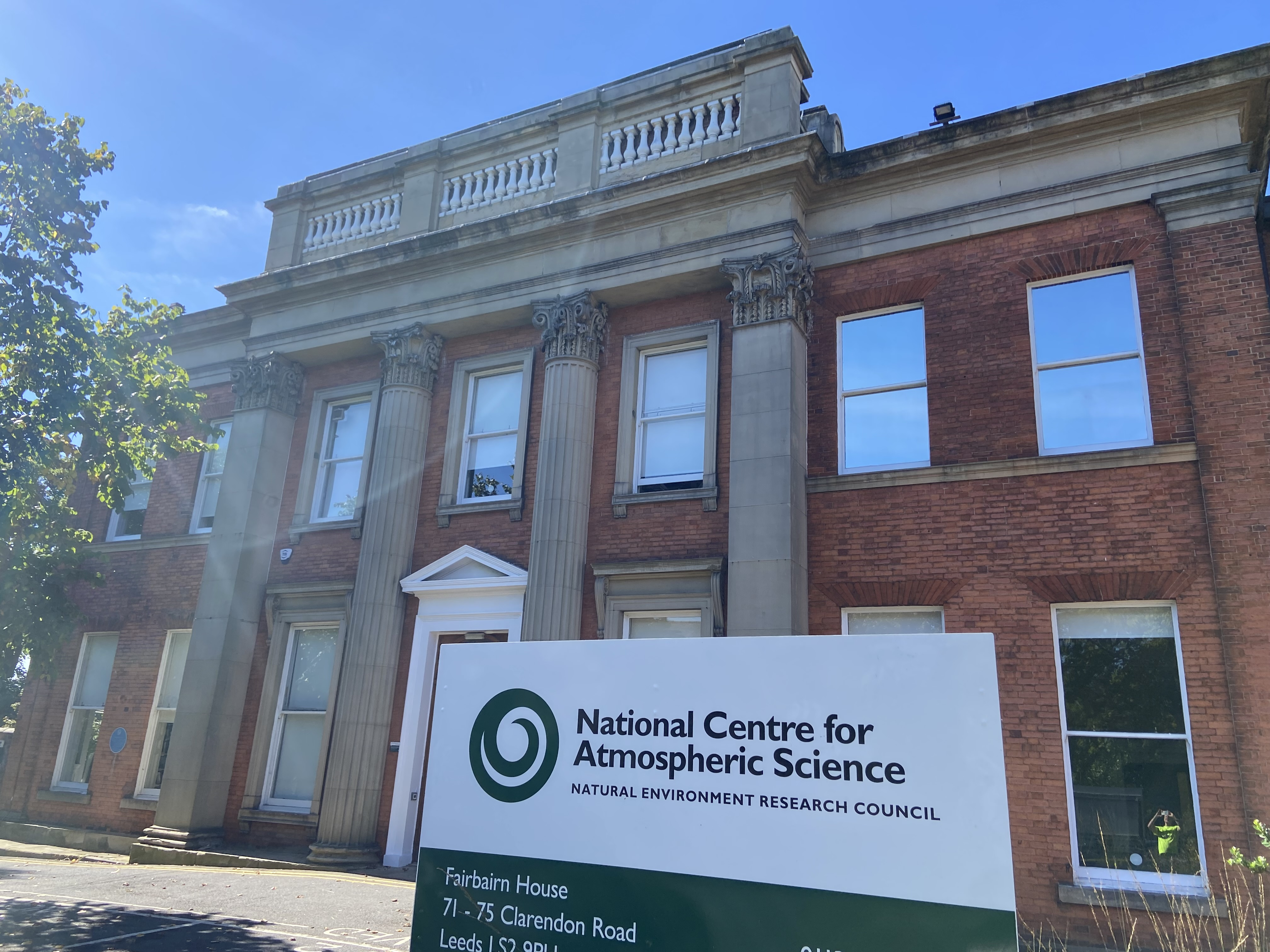
Fairbairn House (National Centre for Atmospheric Science)

The National Centre for Atmospheric Science (NCAS) is a world leading research centre, formed in 2002 and funded annually by the Natural Environment Research Council.

NCAS research falls into three key areas. These are air pollution, climate and high-impact weather and long-term global changes in our atmosphere. They also provide the UK with state-of-the-art services for observing and modelling the atmosphere. These include advanced ground-based observational facilities, computer modelling and support, and facilities for storing and analysing data. Until 2026 this also included the FAAM Airborne Laboratory research aircraft.

NCAS has over two hundred members of staff, embedded at twelve universities and research institutes across the UK. The headquarters is based in Leeds, UK: National Centre For Atmospheric Science Fairbairn House 71-75 Clarendon Road Leeds LS2 9PH
