= Baseball field =

Field on which baseball is played

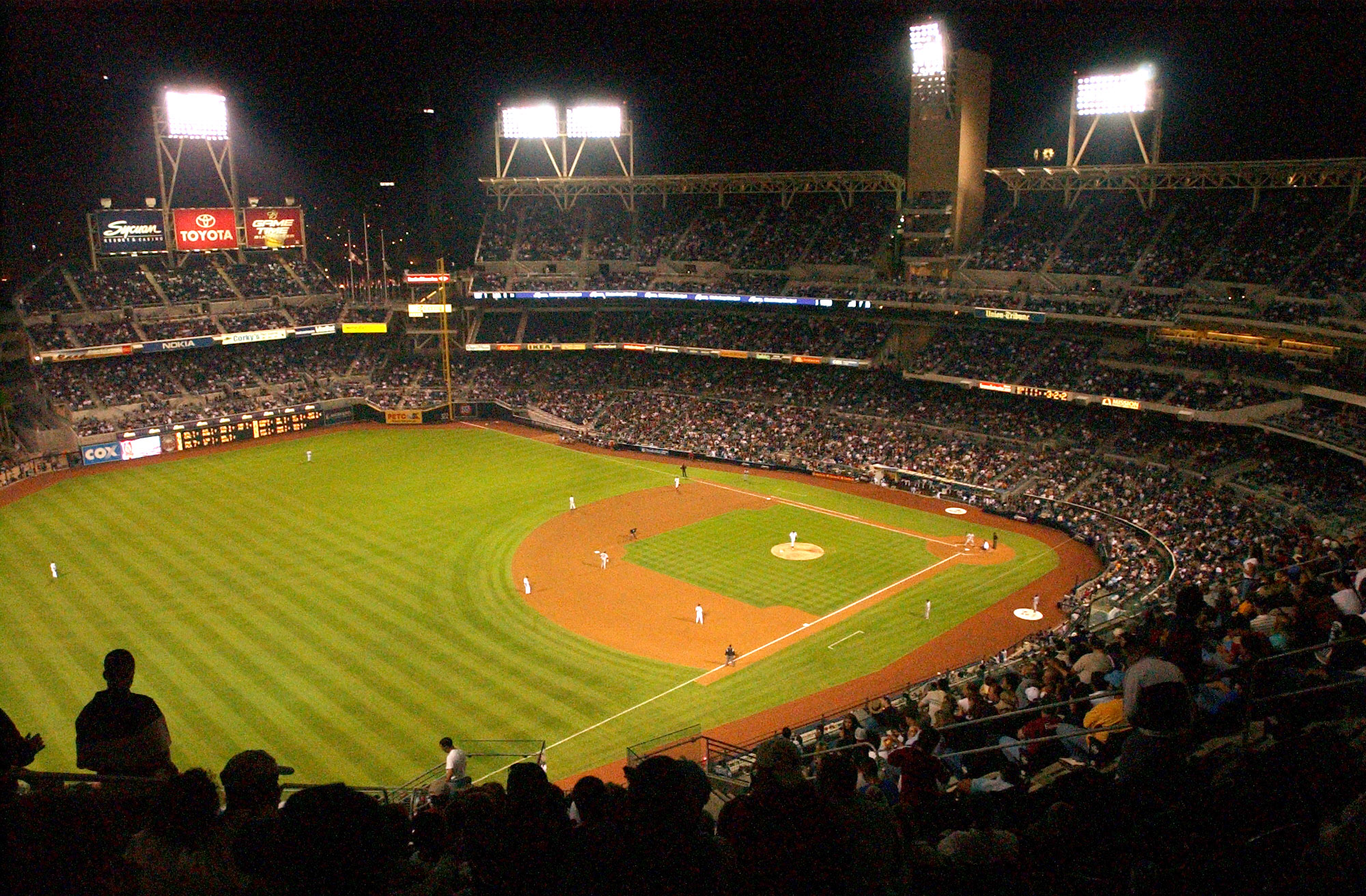
The baseball diamond of the San Diego Padres' Petco Park in 2005

A baseball field, also called a ball field or baseball diamond, is the field upon which the game of baseball is played. The term can also be used as a metonym for a baseball park. The term sandlot is sometimes used, although this usually refers to less organized venues for activities like sandlot ball.

== Specifications ==
Unless otherwise noted, the specifications discussed in this section refer to those described within the Baseball Rules, under which Major League Baseball is played.

Diagram of a baseball field

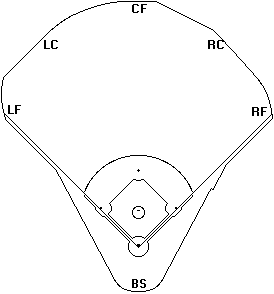
Diagram of a baseball field with outfield and foul zone

The starting point for much of the action on the field is home plate (officially "home base"), a five-sided slab of white rubber. One side is 17 inches (43 cm) long, the two adjacent sides are 8.5 inches (22 cm). The remaining two sides are approximately 12 inches (30 cm) and set at a right angle. The plate is set into the ground so that its surface is level with the field. The corner of home plate where the two 12-inch sides meet at a right angle is at one corner of a 90-foot (27.43 m) square. The dimensional specifications are technically inconsistent because the angle constraints require that the front be √2 times the length of the back, which is not equal to a 17:12 ratio, but a physically built home plate will have side lengths accurate to a few hundredths of an inch. The other three corners of the square, in counterclockwise order from home plate, are called first, second, and third base. These bases are marked by canvas or rubber cushions, 18 inches (46 cm) square and 3–5 inches (7.6–12.7 cm) thick. Adjacent to each of the two parallel 8.5-inch sides is a batter's box.

All the bases, including home plate, lie entirely within fair territory. Thus, any batted ball that touches those bases must necessarily be ruled a fair ball. While the first and third base bags are placed so that they lie inside the 90-foot square formed by the bases, the second base bag is placed so that its center (unlike first, third and home) coincides exactly with the "point" of the ninety-foot square. Thus, although the "points" of the bases are 90 feet apart, the physical distance between each successive pair of base markers is closer to 88 feet (26.8 m).

Near the center of the square is an artificial hill known as the pitcher's mound, atop which is a white rubber slab known as the pitcher's plate, colloquially the "rubber" because of its physical composition. The specifications for the pitcher's mound are described below.

The lines from home plate to first and third bases extend to the nearest fence, stand or other obstruction and are called the foul lines. The portion of the playing field between (and including) the foul lines is fair territory; the rest is "foul territory". The area within the square formed by the bases is officially called the infield, though colloquially this term also includes fair territory in the vicinity of the square; fair territory outside the infield is known as the outfield. Most baseball fields are enclosed with a fence that marks the outer edge of the outfield. The fence is usually set at a distance ranging from 300 to 420 feet (90 to 130 m) from home plate. Most professional and college baseball fields have a right and left foul pole which are about 440 to 500 feet (130 to 150 m) apart. These poles are at the intersection of the foul lines and the respective ends of the outfield fence and, unless otherwise specified within the ground rules, lie in fair territory. Thus, a batted ball that passes over the outfield wall in flight and touches the foul pole is a fair ball and the batter is awarded a home run.

== Infield ==
A baseball infield is the square area within the four 90-foot baselines "(60-foot baselines in Little League Baseball for youths 12 years old and under)". The four bases are integral parts of the infield; a ball that touches any part of a base is considered a fair ball.

=== Bases ===
==== First base ====
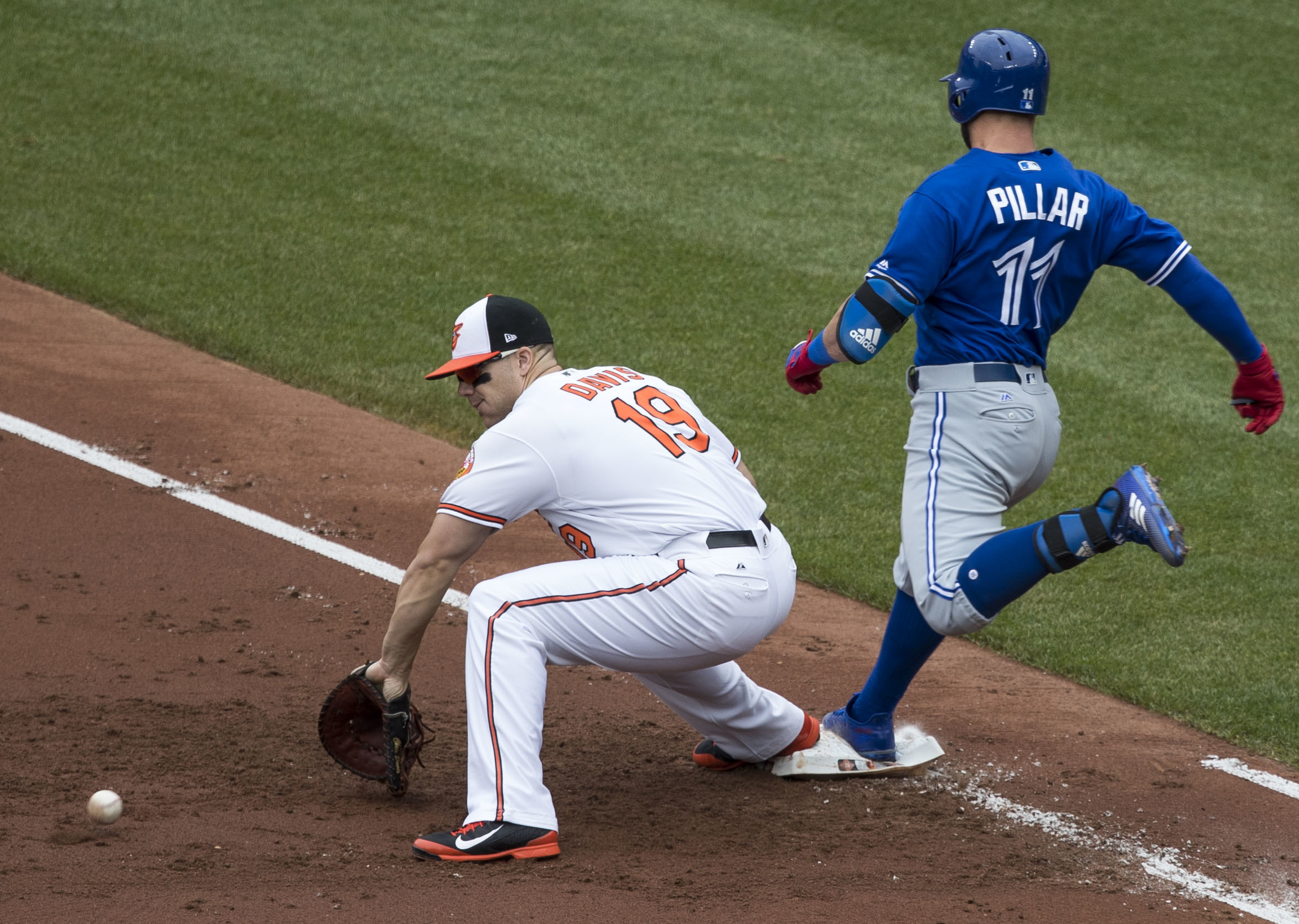
Kevin Pillar of the Toronto Blue Jays reaches first base safely as Chris Davis of the Baltimore Orioles attempts to scoop a bouncing ball thrown by one of the other infielders during a game in May 2017.

First base is the first of the four bases that must be touched by a runner in order to score a run for the batting team. The runner may continue running past first base in a straight line without being in jeopardy of being put out, so long as they make contact with first base and make no move or attempt to advance to second base.

The first baseman is the defensive player mainly responsible for the area near first base. In some youth leagues and adult recreational leagues, a "double first base" or "safety first base" is used. A double first base is rectangular (rather than square), measuring 30 by 15 inches. It is normally colored white and orange (two 15 by 15 inches squares). It is placed with the white half in fair territory and the orange half in foul territory. The white half is used by the first baseman to make plays while the orange half is used by the runner. This creates a separation between the first baseman and runner, reducing the chance of injury on plays at first base.

In the numbering system used to record defensive plays, the first baseman is assigned the number 3.

==== Second base ====
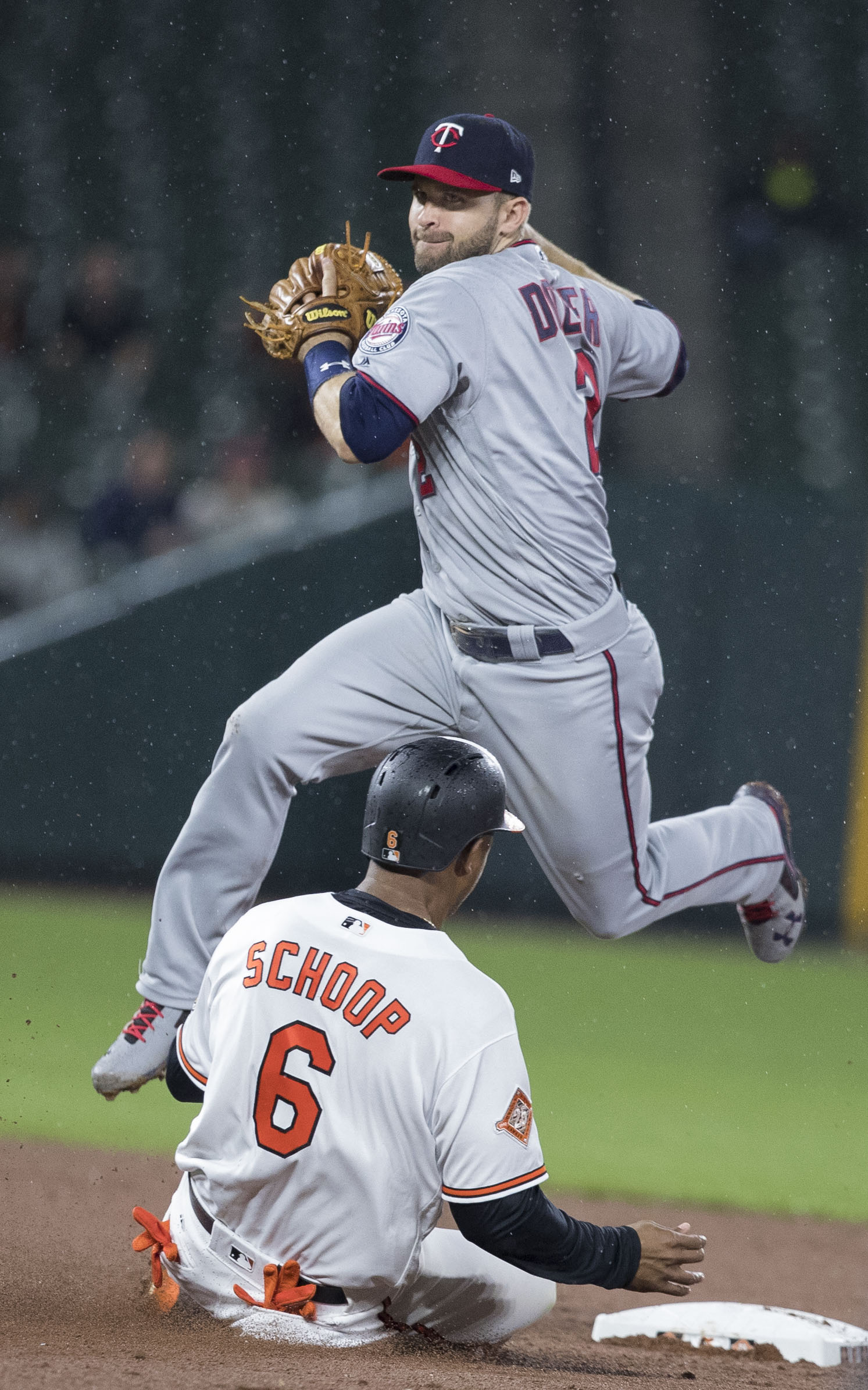
Brian Dozier of the Minnesota Twins leaps over a sliding Jonathan Schoop of the Baltimore Orioles attempting to turn a double play.

Second base is the second of the four bases a runner must touch in order to score a run. Second base is mainly defended by the second baseman and the shortstop. The second baseman and shortstop ideally possess quick reactions and the ability to release the ball rapidly and accurately. One player will usually cover second base while the other attempts to field the ball. Both players must communicate well to be able to make a double play. Particular agility is required of the second baseman in many double play situations, which frequently force the player receiving a throw from the shortstop to immediately throw towards first base while their momentum typically carries them towards third base.

A runner on second base is said to be in "scoring position", since there is a higher likelihood of scoring a run from second base on a single than there is from first base. Since second base is the farthest from home plate, it is the most commonly stolen base in baseball.

In the numbering system used to record defensive plays, the second baseman is assigned the number 4, and the shortstop 6.

==== Third base ====
Third base is the third of the four bases a runner must touch in order to score a run. The third baseman is the defensive player mainly responsible for the area nearest third base. A third baseman ideally possesses quick reaction to batted balls and a strong throwing arm to make the long throw to first base. Third base is sometimes referred to as the "hot corner" as it's common for right-handed batters to hit the ball hard to third base, occasionally making successfully fielding the ball difficult. In the numbering system used to record defensive plays, the third baseman is assigned the number 5.

Like a runner on second base, a runner on third base is said to be in "scoring position", since there is a higher likelihood of scoring a run on any hit, a sacrifice fly, and many other plays, provided that the third and final out is not recorded before they can reach home plate.

==== Home base ====
Specifications of home plate (inches)

Home base, called "home plate", is the final base that a player must touch to score a run. Unlike the other bases, home plate is a five-sided slab of white rubber that is set at ground level.

As with other bases, home plate is entirely in "fair" territory. A batted ball that first hits home plate is "live," and may be fielded up until it touches foul territory between home and either first or third base.

=== Backstop ===
In most MLB stadiums, the backstop is at least 60 feet behind home plate and is composed of a lower solid wall and upper netting that protects spectators behind home plate from wild pitches, passed balls, and foul balls.

In recreational fields, there is usually a tall chain-link fence that surrounds the infield and the players' bench for player safety.

=== Baselines ===
Baselines are straight lines between two adjacent bases normally made of chalk. Physical baselines are not drawn between first and second or second and third bases; the foul lines serve to mark the baseline between home plate and first base, and between third base and home.

==== Running baseline ====
Generally, baserunners are not required to follow the baseline. A baserunner seeking to advance more than one base typically "rounds" the base, following a more circular path. However, a runner's avoidance maneuvers are constrained when the defense tries to tag him. At the moment the defense begins the attempt, the baserunner's running baseline is established as a direct line from his current position to the base he is trying for. A runner straying more than three feet (1 m) away from this baseline to avoid a tag may be called out.

==== Running lane ====
Beginning halfway between home and first base, and ending at first base, there is a second chalk line to the right of the foul line. This second line and the part of the foul line it runs parallel to, form the running lane that defines the path in which a batter-runner must run as he is advancing to first base. Rule 6.05(k) of the Official Baseball Rules states that if a batter-runner running to first base runs outside the running lane, and "in doing so" interferes with the fielder taking the throw at first, then the batter-runner is automatically out. First base itself is not located in the running lane, but Rule 6.05 lets the batter-runner leave the running lane "by means of a step, stride or slide in the immediate vicinity of first base" to step on first base.

=== Playing areas near home plate ===
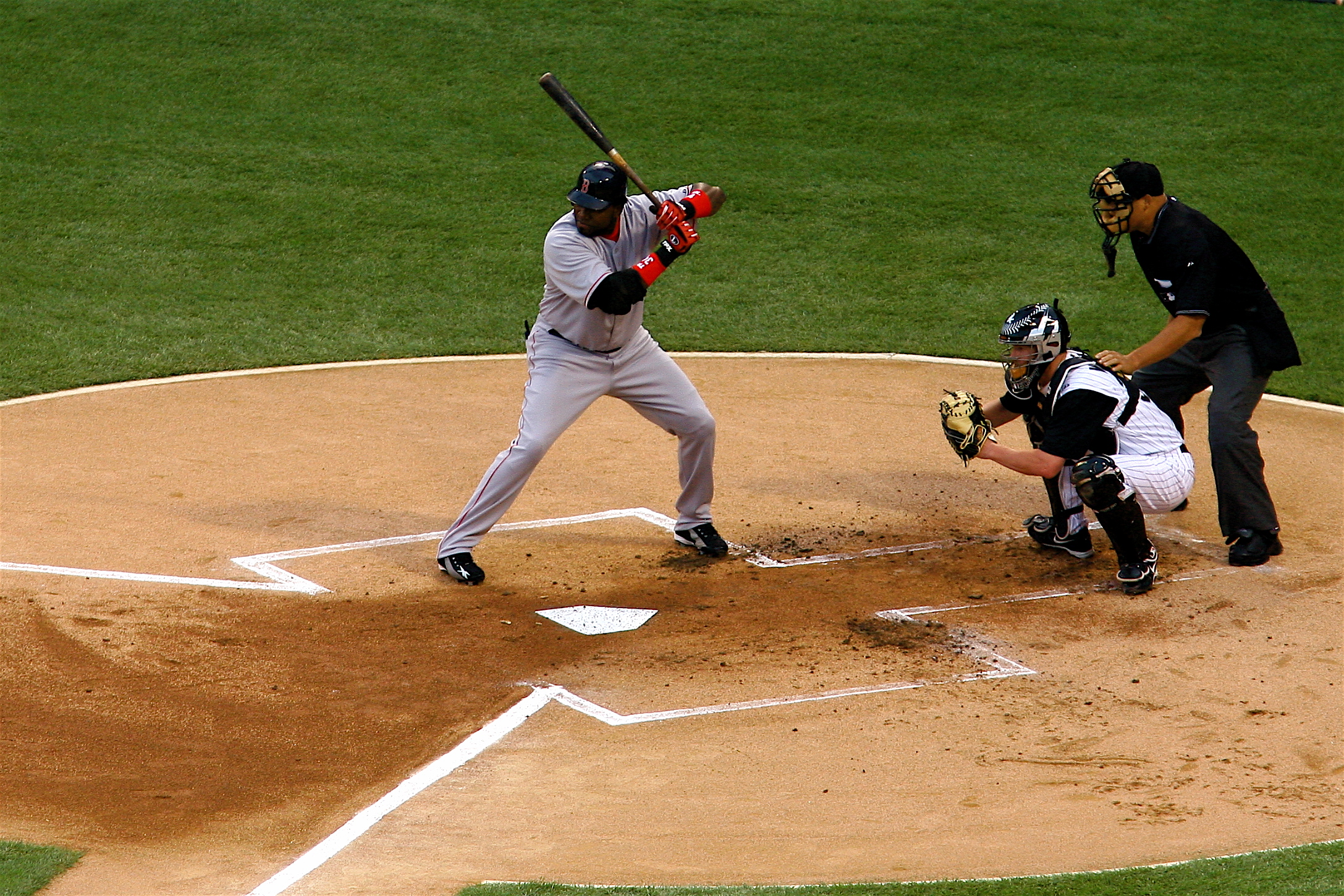
David Ortiz (in gray) of the Boston Red Sox stands in the left-handed hitters' batter's box at U.S. Cellular Field against the Chicago White Sox on July 7, 2006.

==== Batter's box ====
The batter's box is the place where the batter stands when ready to receive a pitch from the pitcher. It is usually drawn in chalk on the dirt surrounding home plate, and the insides of the boxes are watered down before each game.

The chalk lines delineating the two foul lines are rarely extended through the batter's boxes. However, those lines exist conceptually for the purpose of judging a batted ball fair or foul. In addition, inside edges of the batter's boxes are often not laid-in with chalk. Similarly, though not marked, those lines continue to exist for the purpose of the rules pertaining to the batter's box and the batter's position relative thereto.

There are two batter's boxes, one on each side of home plate. The batter's boxes are 4 feet (1.22 m) wide and 6 feet (1.83 m) long. The batter's boxes are centered lengthwise at the center of home plate with the inside line of each batter's box 6 inches (15 cm) from the near edge of home plate. A right-handed batter would stand in the batter's box on the right side of home plate from the perspective of the pitcher. A left-handed batter would stand in the batter's box to their left. A batter may only occupy one batter's box at a time and may not legally leave the batter's box after the pitcher has come set or has started their windup. Should the batter wish to leave the batter's box once the pitcher has engaged the rubber, they must first ask the umpire for time-out. Time will not be granted if the pitcher has already started their pitching motion. For playing rules relating to the batter's box, see Rules 6.05 and 6.06 of the Official Baseball Rules.

==== Catcher's box ====
The catcher's box is an area of the field behind home plate which the catcher occupies to avoid committing a balk when a pitch is thrown.

==== Pitcher's mound ====
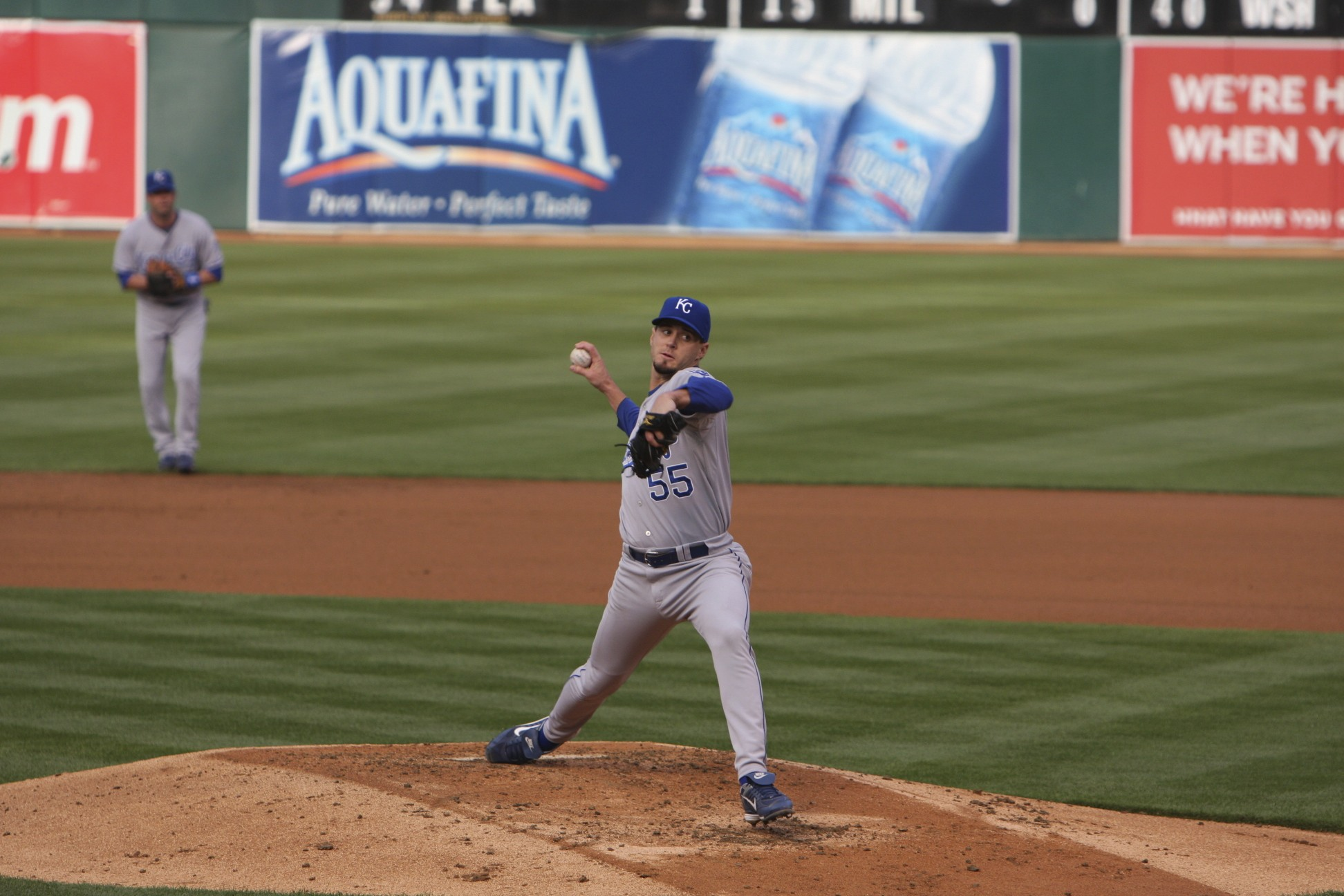
Kansas City Royals pitcher Gil Meche moves forward off the rubber as the pitch is released.

In roughly the middle of the diamond, equidistant between first and third base, and a few feet closer to home plate than to second base, is a low artificial hill called the pitcher's mound. This is where the pitcher stands when throwing the pitch. Atop the mound is a white rubber slab, called the pitcher's plate or pitcher's rubber. It measures 6 inches (15 cm) front-to-back and 2 feet (61 cm) across, the front of which is exactly 60 feet 6 inches (18.44 m) from the rear point of home plate. This peculiar distance was set by the rule makers in 1893, not due to a clerical or surveying error as popular myth has it, but intentionally (further details under History).

In Major League Baseball, a regulation mound is 18 feet (5.5 m) in diameter, with the center 59 feet (18 m) from the rear point of home plate, on the line between home plate and second base. The front edge of the pitcher's plate or rubber is 18 inches (46 cm) behind the center of the mound, making the front edge's midpoint 60 feet 6 inches from the rear point of home plate. six inches (15 cm) in front of the pitcher's rubber the mound begins to slope downward. The top of the rubber is to be no higher than ten inches (25 cm) above home plate. From 1903 through 1968, this height limit was set at 15 inches (38 cm), but in reality differed from ballpark to ballpark as the height was considered too difficult to enforce.

A higher mound generally favors the pitcher, and teams that emphasize pitching (such as the Los Angeles Dodgers) will favor a slightly higher mound. With the height advantage, the pitcher gains more leverage and can put more downward velocity on the ball, making it more difficult for the batter to strike the ball squarely with the bat. After 1968, known among baseball historians as "the year of the pitcher", the official height of the mound was lowered from 15 to 10 inches (38 to 25 cm) in an attempt to "increase the batting" once again.

A pitcher's mound is difficult for groundskeepers to maintain. Usually before every game it is watered down to keep the dust from spreading. On youth and amateur baseball fields, the mound may be much different from the rule book definition due to erosion and repair attempts. Even in the major leagues, each mound gains its own character, as pitchers are allowed to kick away pieces of dirt in their way, thereby sculpting the mound a bit to their preference.

The pitcher may keep a rosin bag on the rear of the mound to dry off their hands. Major League Baseball teams are also permitted cleat cleaners on the back of the mound. This may be a flat grate-style plate, or simply a hand tool such as a piece of wood used to remove mud and dirt from cleats. These items are allowed to remain on the backside of the mound at the discretion of the umpire, thus reducing the probability that they will affect a live play.

== Grass line ==
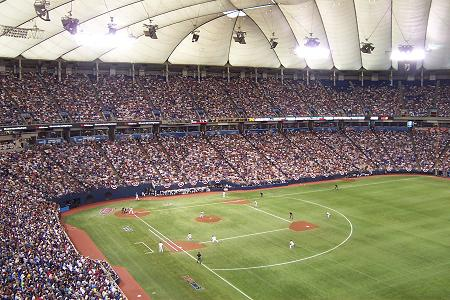
The Hubert H. Humphrey Metrodome, showing a white "grass" line

The grass line, where the dirt of the infield ends and the grass of the outfield begins, has no special significance to the rules of the game (except in Double-A Minor League Baseball where all infielders must be on the infield dirt when the pitch is thrown as part of an experimental rule for the 2021 season), but it can influence the outcome of a game. Dirt running paths between the bases (and at one time, and still in some parks, between the pitcher and the catcher) have existed since the beginning of the game, although they were not mentioned in the rule books until around 1950, and their specifications are flexible. In addition to providing a running path, the grass lines act as a visual aid so that players, umpires and fans may better judge distance from the center of the diamond. Occasionally the ball may take a tricky bounce off the dirt area or the edge between the dirt and the grass. Multiple World Series championships (including 1924 and 1960) have been influenced by erratic hops of ground balls.

In artificial turf stadiums, infield dirt was originally only placed in three five-sided areas around the bases and in two circles around the pitcher's and batting areas, which are referred to as "cutouts". In this configuration, the "grass line" is usually designated with a white arc. This setup first appeared at Cincinnati's Riverfront Stadium upon its opening in 1970. Among Major League Baseball fields, Rogers Centre was the last stadium to maintain this type of configuration and was reconfigured with a full dirt infield starting in the 2016 MLB season.

In some college baseball parks with artificial turf fields, the entire field (along with possibly the pitcher's mound) is made up of turf, with parts of the field mainly containing dirt instead merely being clay-colored turf.

== Outfield ==
The outfield is made from shortly-trimmed grass or artificial turf. It is where the outfielders play. The positions to play in the outfield are left, center, and right field (named in relation to the batter's position; thus left field is beyond third base and right field is beyond first base). Outfields vary in size and shape depending on the overall size and shape of the playing field. The outfield stretches from the infield to the outfield wall and it contains the warning track. Outfields especially vary from Little League to major league fields. Little League outfields vary more in size than Major League outfields. Outfields often differ from infields in the specific type of grass used, but most major league outfields are grass.

=== Warning track ===
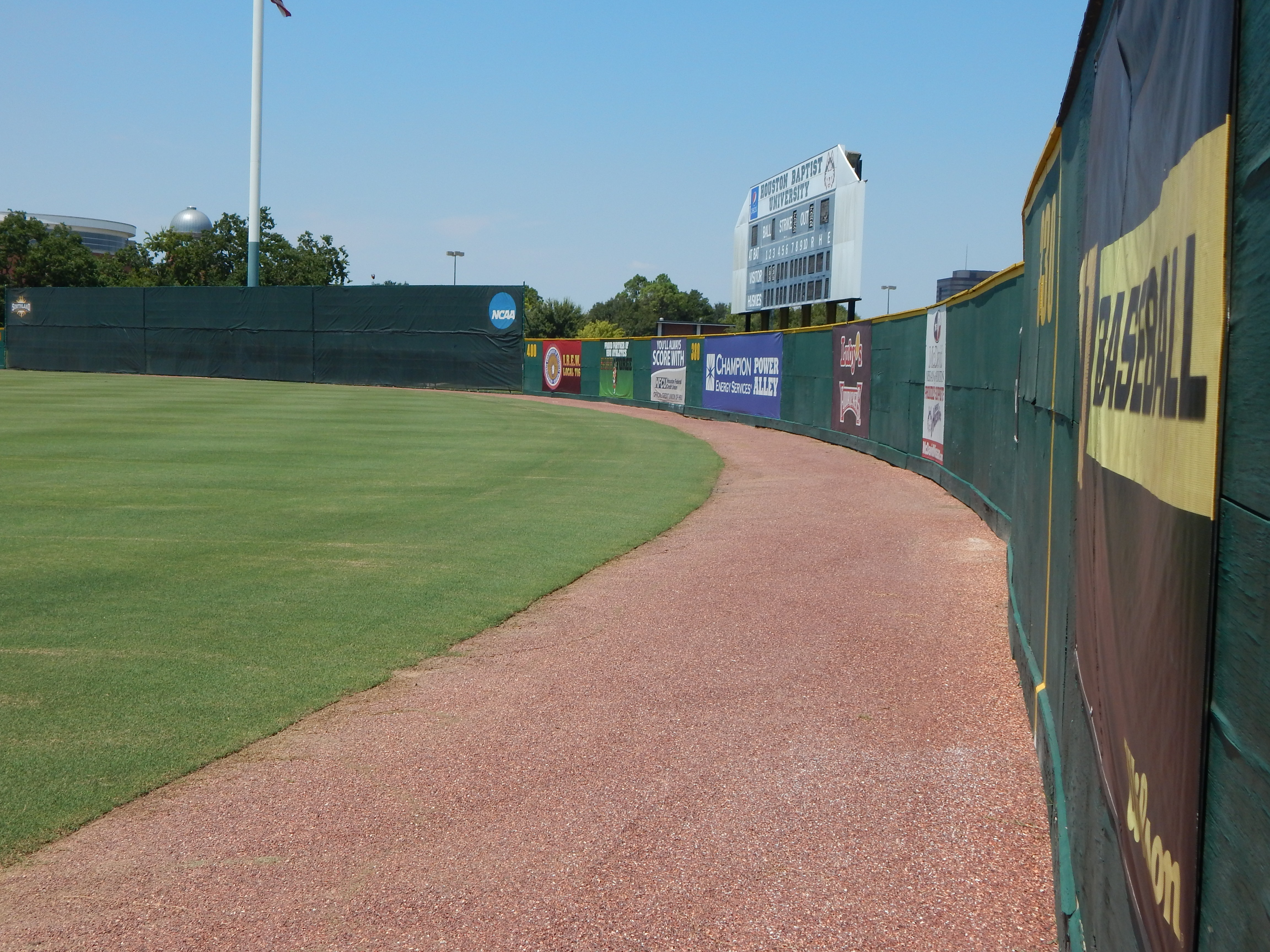
The warning track abutting the outfield fence of Husky Field, used by the Houston Baptist Huskies baseball team

The warning track is the strip of dirt at the edges of the baseball field (especially in front of the home run fence and along the left and right sides of a field). Because the warning track's color and feel differ from the grass field, a fielder can remain focused on a fly ball near the fence and measure their proximity to the fence while attempting to catch the ball safely.

A warning track's width is not specified in the rules. It is generally designed to give about three steps of warning to the highest-level players using the field. Typical widths run from about six feet for Little League fields to about 10–15 feet (3.0–4.6 meters) for college- or professional-level play. A warning track this wide also lets groundskeepers avoid driving maintenance vehicles on the grass.

The track can be composed of finely ground rock particles such as cinders, which is why announcer Bob Wolff called it the "cinder path" rather than the "warning track".

The idea of a warning track originated in Yankee Stadium, where an actual running track was built for use in track and field events. When ballpark designers saw how the track helped fielders, it soon became a feature of every ballpark.

Fielders often knowingly risk injury crashing into a wall trying to make a catch despite the warning track. For this reason, outfield walls are typically padded for extra safety. Wrigley Field's brick wall is covered only by ivy, which is not especially soft. However, there are pads on the walls of the tight left and right field corners in foul ground.

Warning-track power is a derogatory term for a batter who seems to have just enough power to hit the ball to the warning track for an out, but not quite enough to hit a home run. The term more generally refers to someone or something that is almost but not quite good enough for something.

=== Outfield wall ===
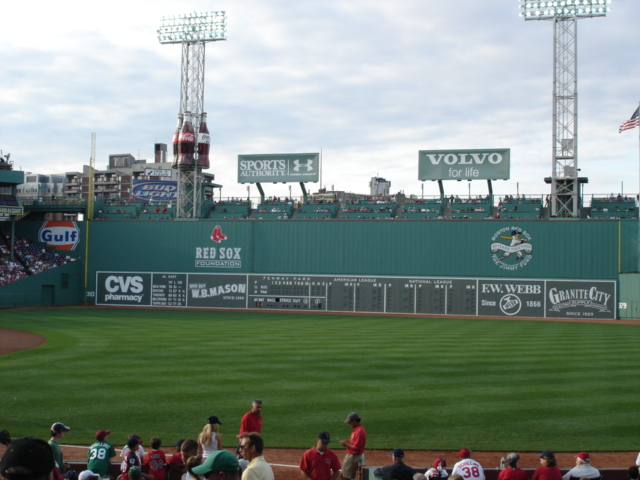
Boston's Fenway Park's left-field wall, the Green Monster, in 2006, showing the manual scoreboard, and Green Monster seating, and the additions of charity advertisements along the top, billboards above the seating, and the American League East standings

The outfield wall or fence is the outer boundary of the outfield. A ball passing over the wall is dead. If it passes over the wall in fair territory, without touching the ground, it is a home run. The official rules do not specify the shape, height, or composition of the wall, or a specific mandatory distance from home plate (though Major League Baseball mandates a minimum distance of 250 feet (76 m) and recommends a minimum distance of 320 feet (98 m) at the foul poles and 400 feet (120 m) at center field). As a result, baseball fields can vary greatly along those lines. The wall has numbers affixed or painted on it that denote the distance from that point on the wall to home plate. In most modern major league ballparks, the wall is made of some hard material (e.g., concrete, plywood, sheet metal) with padding on the field side to protect players who may collide with the wall at high speed while trying to make a play. Chain link fencing may also be incorporated into the wall in areas where the wall needs to be transparent, e.g., an outfield bullpen, a spectator area behind the wall, or to protect a scoreboard incorporated into the wall. Many ballparks feature a yellow line denoting the top of the wall to aid umpires in judging whether the ball passed over the wall or if the ball is fair or foul.

==== Foul poles ====
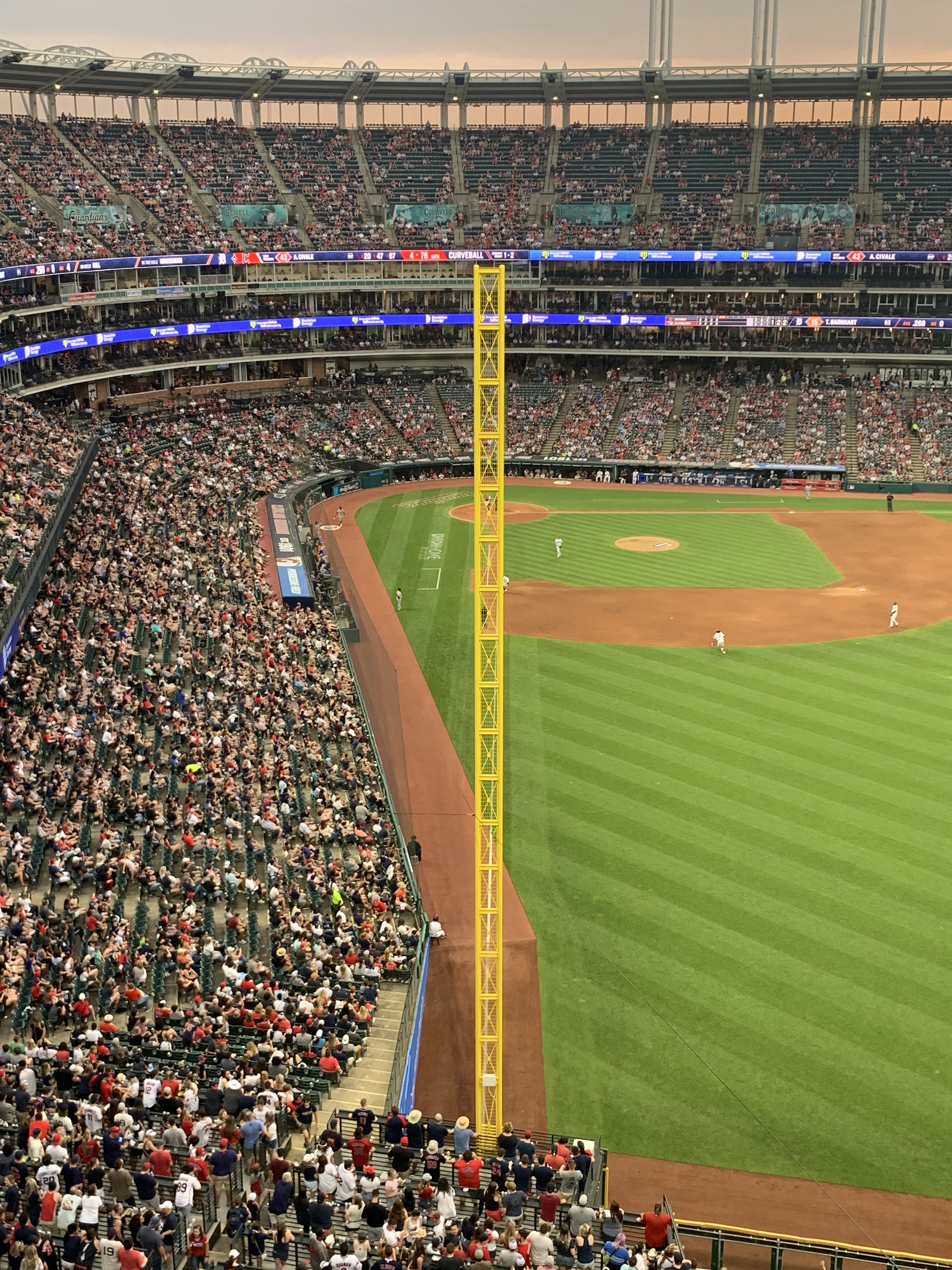
One of two foul poles at Progressive Field, Cleveland

Foul poles, if present, help umpires judge whether a fly ball hit above the fence line is foul (out of play) or fair (a home run). The poles are a vertical extension of the foul lines at the edge of the field of play. The outer edge of the foul lines and foul poles define foul territory. Both the lines and the poles are actually in fair territory, in contrast to American football and basketball, where the lines marking the playing boundaries are out of bounds. The minimum distance to hit a home run (along either foul line) is set by baseball rules, generally at 325 feet (99 m).

Before 1931 (with the exception of a couple months in 1920) the foul lines extended indefinitely; a batter was awarded a home run only if a fly ball out of the field was fair where it landed. Now, a batted ball that leaves the field in flight is judged fair or foul at the point it leaves the field. Thus, such a fly ball passing on the fair side of a foul pole, or hitting a foul pole, is a home run regardless of where the ball goes thereafter.

Foul poles are typically much higher than the top of the outfield fence or wall, and often have a narrow screen running along the fair side of the pole. This further aids the umpires' judgment, as a ball that bounces off this screen is a home run. It can still be a difficult call, especially in ballparks with no outfield stands behind the poles to provide perspective. Wrigley Field is notorious for arguments over long, curving flies down a foul line (most notably in left field) that sail higher than the foul pole.

At Major League Baseball fields, foul poles are usually yellow. Those at Citi Field are orange. At Petco Park, there is no foul pole in left field; the pole's function is served by a yellow metal strip along the corner of the Western Metal Supply Co. building. Several parks featuring advertising along the length of the foul pole, with the most prominent example being the advertising from Chick-fil-A at both Citi Field and Daikin Park (serving as a pun, with "fowl" being another term for a chicken, the primary meat featured by that restaurant chain).

== Player preparation and coaching areas ==
=== Bullpen ===
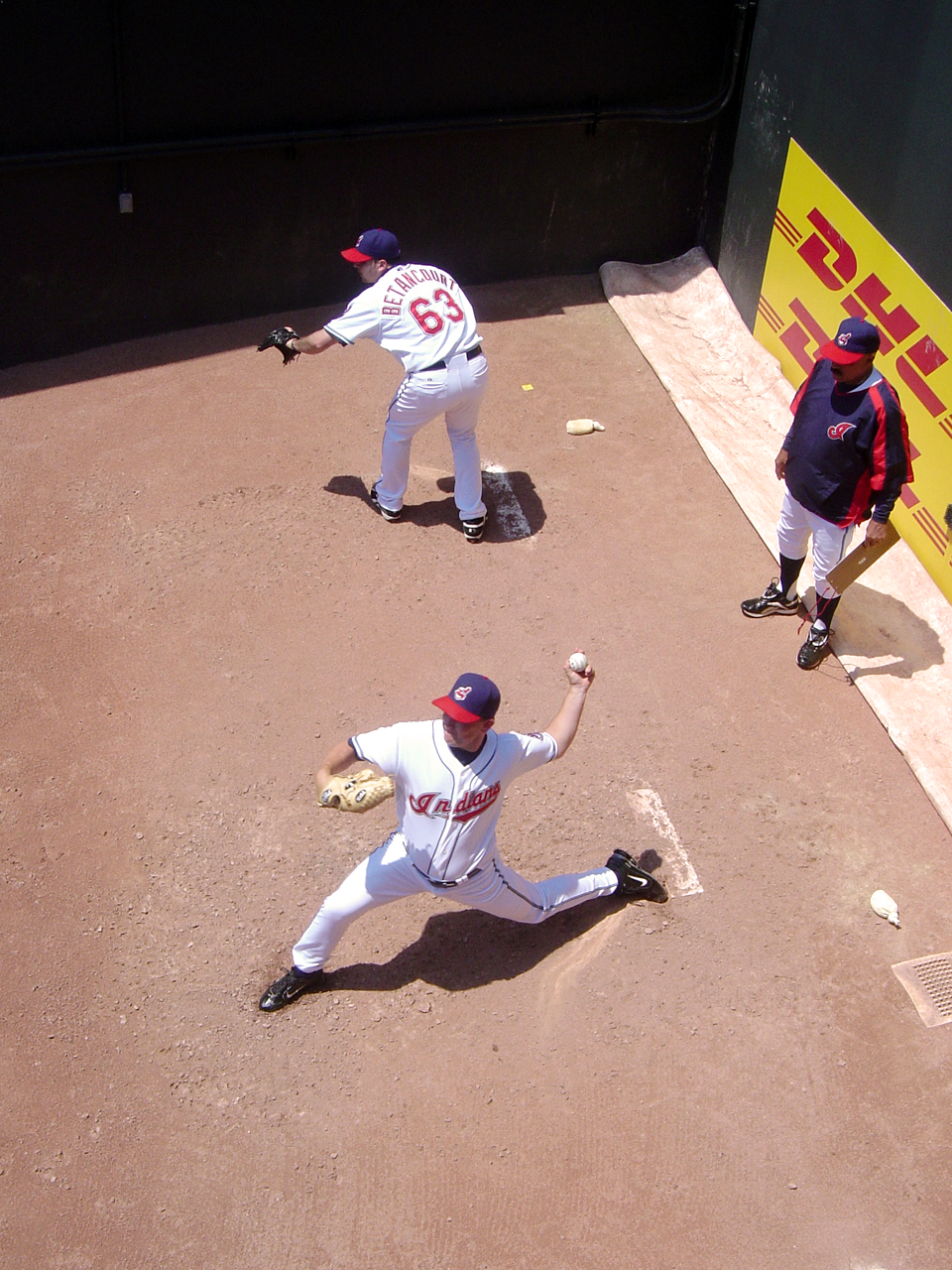
Pitchers warming up in the bullpen

The bullpen (sometimes referred to as simply "the 'pen") is the area where pitchers warm up before entering a game. Depending on the ballpark, it may be situated in foul territory along the baselines or just beyond the outfield fence. Relief pitchers usually wait in the bullpen when they have yet to play in a game, rather than in the dugout with the rest of the team. The starting pitcher also makes their final pregame warmups in the bullpen. Managers can call coaches in the bullpen on an in-house telephone from the dugout to tell a certain pitcher to begin their warmup tosses. "Bullpen" is also used metonymically to describe a team's collection of relief pitchers.

=== On-deck circles ===
There are two on-deck circles in the field, one for each team, positioned in foul ground between home plate and the respective teams' benches. The on-deck circle is where the next scheduled batter, or "on-deck" batter, warms up while waiting for the current batter to finish their turn. The on-deck circle is either an area composed of bare dirt; a plain circle painted onto artificial turf; or often, especially at the professional level, a mat made from artificial material, with the team or league logo painted onto it.

=== Coach's boxes ===
The coach's boxes, located behind first and third base, are where the first and third base coaches are supposed to stand, although coaches often stand outside the box. This is permissible as long as the coach does not interfere with play and the opposing team does not object (in which case the umpire shall ensure that all coaches on both teams must abide by the boundaries of the coach's boxes). The coach's boxes are marked with chalk or paint. In the early days of baseball, the term "coacher's box" was used, as "coach" was taken to be a verb. As the term "coach" evolved to also be a noun, the name of the box also changed.

== History ==
=== Knickerbocker Rules ===
The basic layout of the field has been little changed since the Knickerbocker Rules of the 1840s. Those rules specified the distance from home to second as 42 "paces". The dictionary definition of a "pace" at the time was 30 inches, yielding base paths of approximately 75 feet; however, if a "pace" of three feet was meant then the distance would have been 89 feet. It is not implausible that the early clubs simply stepped off the distance. 30 yards (90 feet) between the bases was first explicitly prescribed by the NABBP Convention of 1857. Through trial and error, 90 feet had been settled upon as the optimal distance. 100 feet would have given too much advantage to the defense, and 80 feet too much to the offense.

The original Knickerbocker Rules did not specify the pitching distance explicitly; the 1854 Unified Rules stated "from Home to pitcher not less than fifteen paces". By the time major league baseball began in the 1870s, the pitcher was compelled to pitch from within a "box" whose front edge was 45 feet (14 m) from the "point" of home plate. Although they had to release the ball before crossing the line, as with bowlers in cricket, they also had to start their delivery from within the box, meaning that they could only run for a short distance before throwing; they could not run in from the field as bowlers do. Furthermore, the pitcher had to throw underhand. By the 1880s, pitchers had mastered the underhand delivery—in fact, in 1880, there were two perfect games within a week of each other.

=== Modern history ===
In an attempt to "increase the batting", the front edge of the pitcher's box was moved back 5 feet in 1881, to 50 feet (15 m) from home plate. The size of the box was altered over the following few years. Pitchers were allowed to throw overhand starting in 1884, and that tilted the balance of power again. In 1887, the box was set at 4 feet (1.2 m) wide and 5.5 feet (1.7 m) deep, with the front edge still 50 feet from the plate. However, the pitcher was compelled to deliver the ball with their back foot at the 55.5-foot (16.9 m) line of the box, thus somewhat restricting their ability to "power" the ball with their overhand delivery.

In 1893, the box was replaced by the pitcher's plate, although "the box" is still used today as a slang term for the pitcher's location on the field. Exactly 5 feet was added to the point the pitcher had to toe, again "to increase the batting" (and hopefully to increase attendance, as fan interest had flagged somewhat), resulting in the seemingly peculiar pitching distance of 60.5 feet (18.44 m).

Some sources suggest that the pitching distance evolved from 45 to 50 to 60.5 feet. However, the first two were the "release point" and the third is the "pushoff point." The 1893 rule change added only 5 feet to the release point, not 10.5 feet.

Originally the pitcher threw from flat ground. Gradually, the raised mound was developed, somewhat returning the advantage to the pitchers. From 1893 to 1950, a stipulation was added that the mound be no more than 15 inches above the field. Before the mid-20th century, it was common for baseball fields to include a dirt pathway between the pitcher's mound and home plate. This feature is sometimes known as the "keyhole" due to the shape that it makes together with the mound. The keyhole was once as wide as the pitcher's box and resembled a cricket pitch. Sometimes this path extended through the batting area and all the way to the backstop. Once the rounded pitcher's mound was developed, the path became more ornamental than practical, and was gradually thinned before being largely abandoned by the 1950s. In recent years some ballparks, such as Comerica Park and Chase Field in the major leagues, have revived the feature for nostalgic reasons.

From 1857 to 1867 home plate was a circular iron plate, painted or enameled white, covering "a space equal to one square foot of surface", i.e. with a diameter of ~13-1/2 inches. In 1868 the plate was changed to a square, 12" on a side, originally set with the flat sides toward the pitcher and catcher; the new professional National Association rotated it 45 degrees in 1871. In 1872 the rules required it to be made of white marble or stone set flush with the ground. For the rest of the century materials varied between stone, iron and wood, but at all times it was a white twelve-inch square. The pentagonal shape and the mandatory use of rubber were developed by Robert Keating, who had pitched one game for the 1887 Baltimore Orioles; the new plate was adopted by the National League in 1900. From 1861 to 1874 the center, not the back, of the plate was situated on the intersection of the foul lines, and in 1875–76 was moved entirely into foul ground with the "pitcher's point" at the intersection. In 1877 it was moved forward to its modern location, wholly in fair territory.

There were no batters' boxes before 1874. Up until that time, the batter was required to hit with their front foot on a line passing through the center of the plate. The 1874 batters' boxes were 6 feet by 3 feet, 12 inches from the plate; the modern dimensions (6' x 4') were instituted in 1885 by the National League and the following year by the American Association

Historic baseball fields

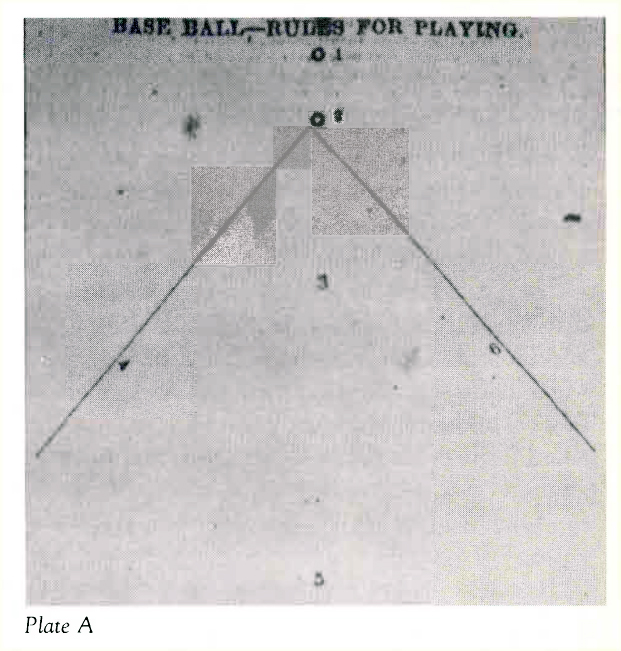
1856

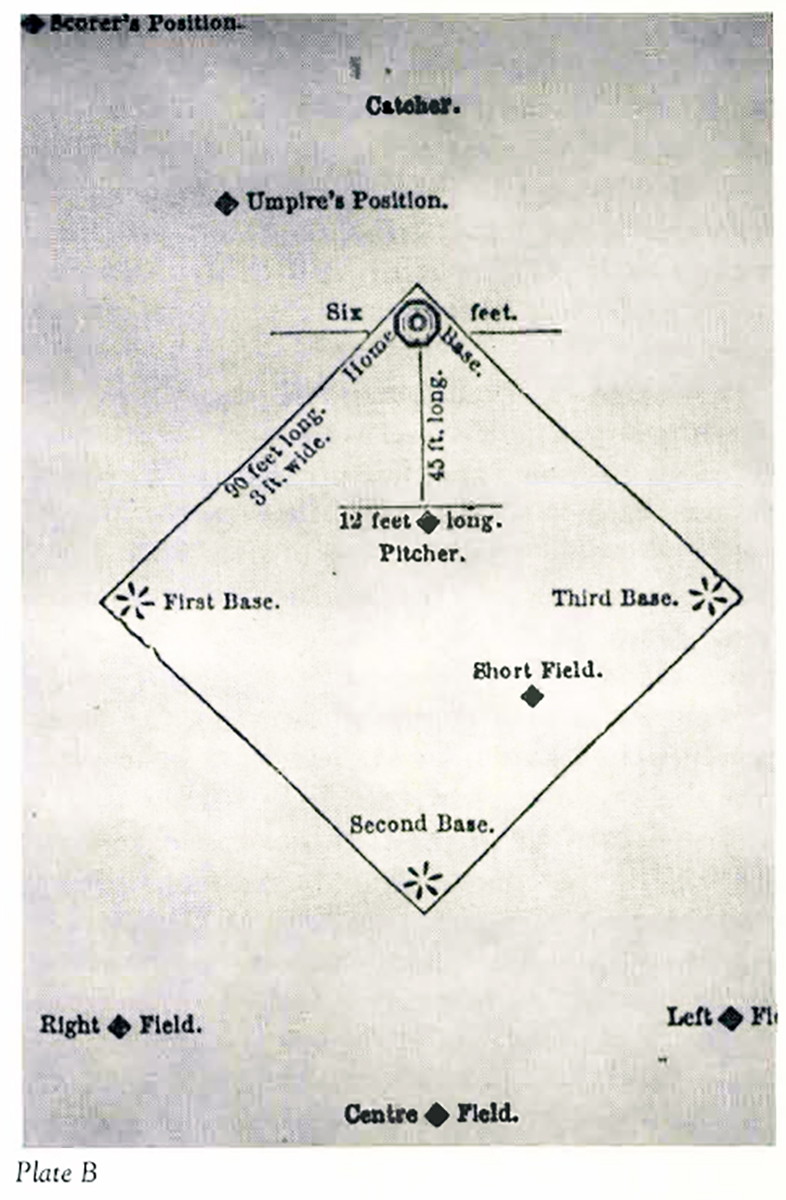
1862

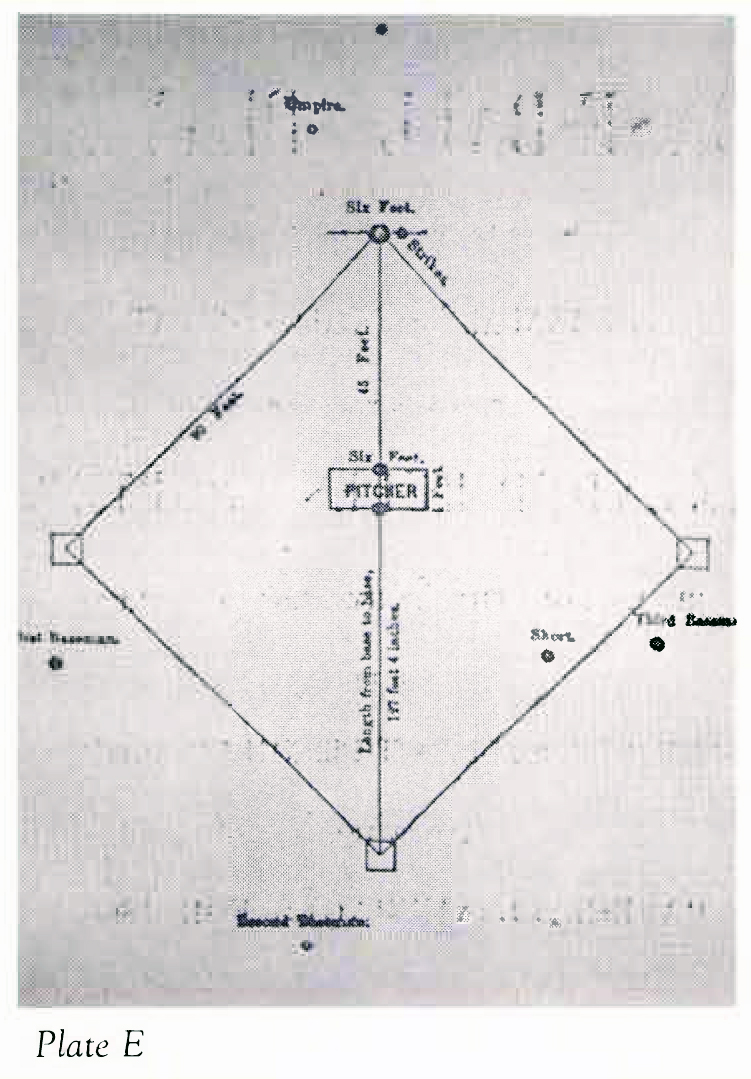
1867

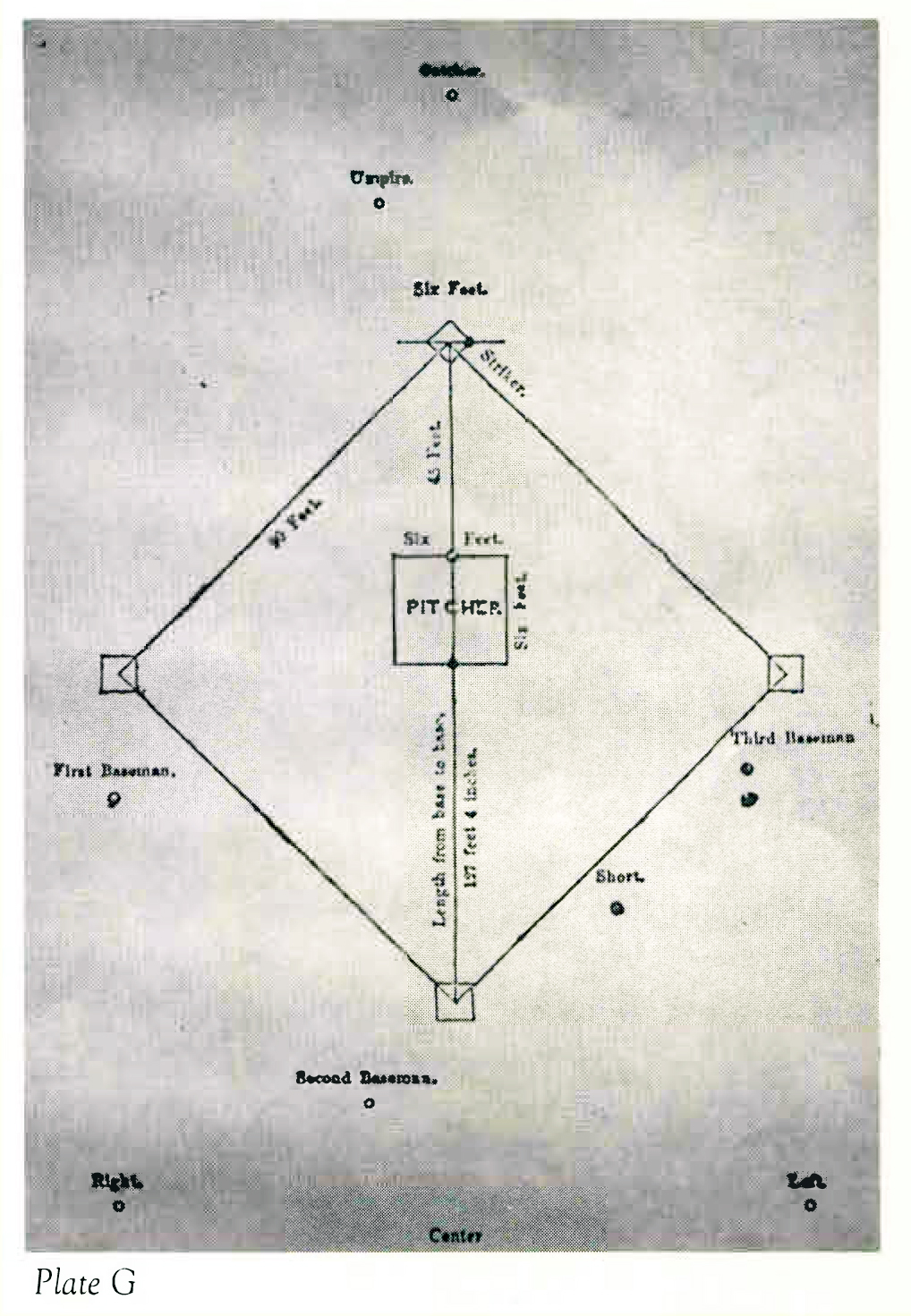
1869

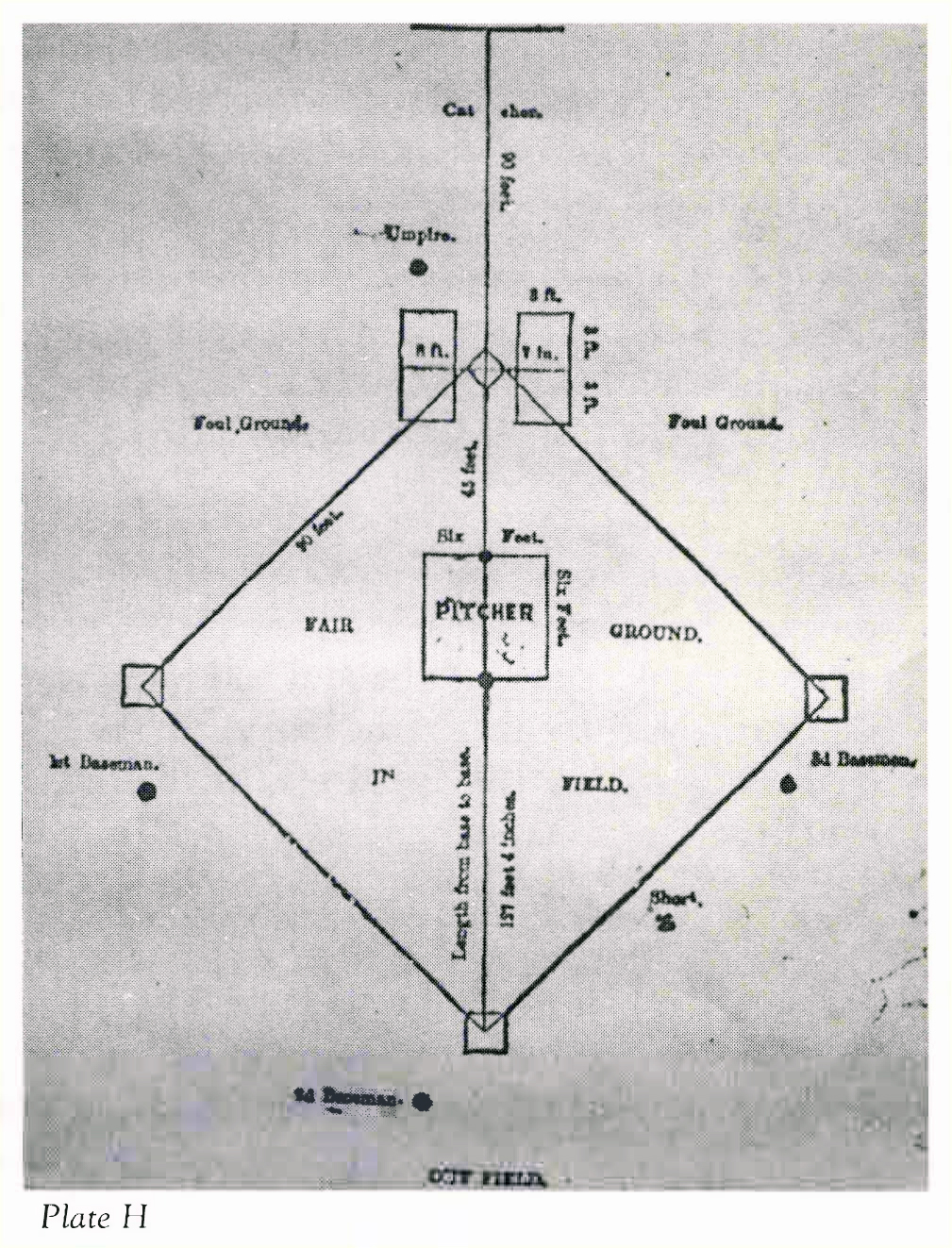
1877

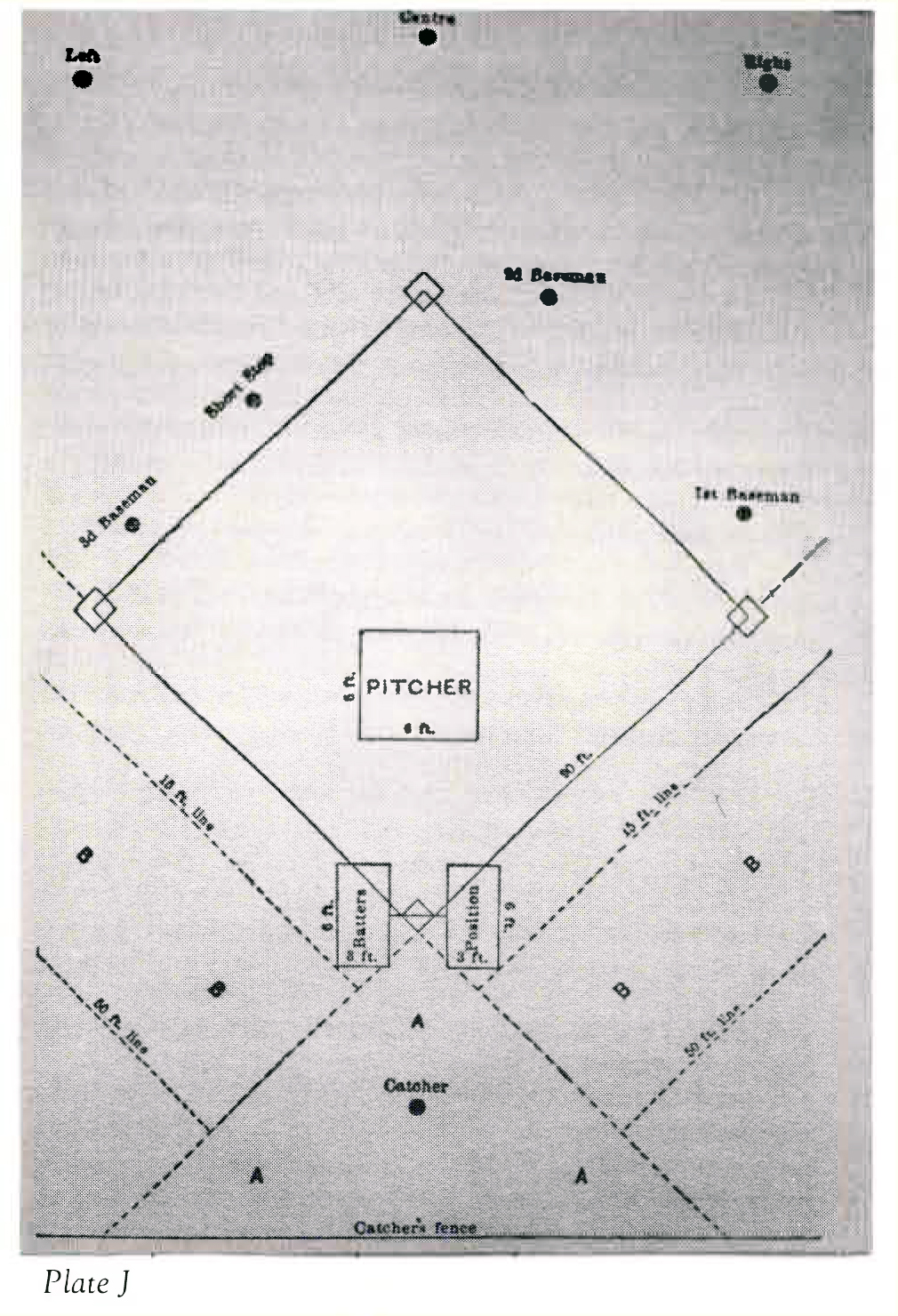
1878

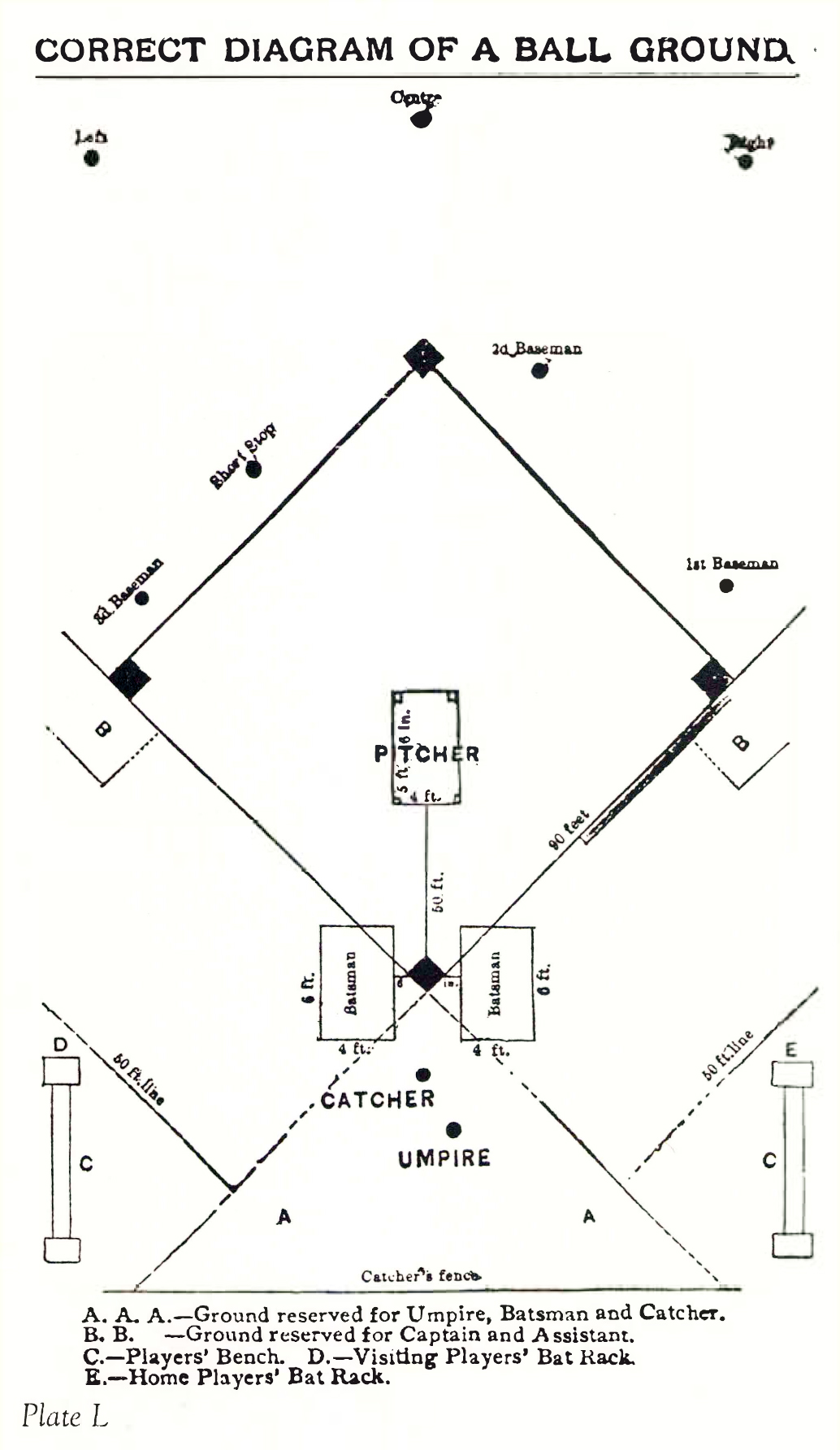
1887

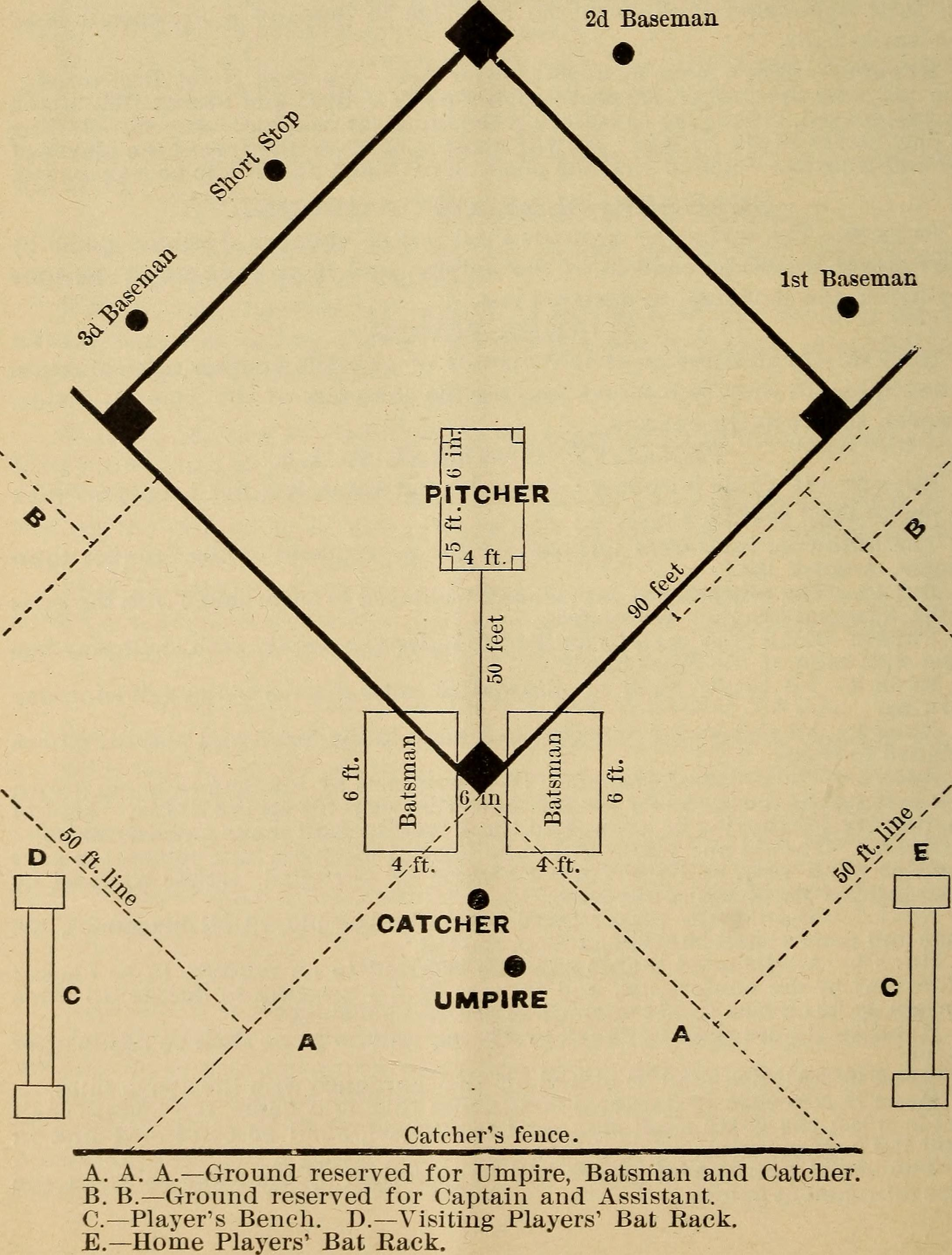
1889

== Maintenance ==
See: Turf management, Sports turf, Groundskeeping#Groundskeeping equipment, Equipment manager, and Sand-based athletic fields

== Honors and awards ==
The Sports Turf Managers Association (STMA) presents various awards each year. Starting in 2001, its Sports Turf Manager of the Year Awards have been presented annually in the Triple-A, Double-A, Class A, and Short-Season/Rookie divisions of Minor League Baseball and are chosen from the 16 league winners. STMA also presents the Baseball Field of the Year Award, which includes Schools and Parks, College/University and Professional categories.

== See also ==
- Baseball metaphors for sex
- Baseball5 field
- Batsmen's grounds, the cricket equivalent to bases
- Official Rules of Major League Baseball
- Softball field
- The Baseball Encyclopedia
