= Coach's box =

Term used in numerous sports

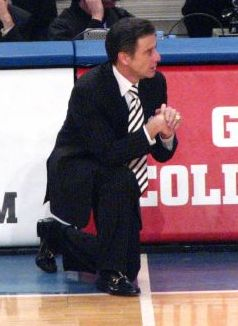
Rick Pitino at the edge of the coach's box while coaching the Louisville Cardinals men's basketball team

The coach's box (or coaches' box for multiple coaches) is a term used in numerous sports. In basketball, it is a line that represents how far a coach may come towards centercourt and away from the sideline. In baseball, it is the space where the first-base coach and third-base coach stands. In soccer, the coach's box is simply a term for the typical area that the coach or manager is standing.

== Baseball ==
In baseball, it is the space where the first-base coach and third-base coach stands. It is also common practice for a coach who has a play at his base to leave the coach's box to signal the player to slide, advance or return to a base. In Major League Baseball (MLB), this may be allowed by the umpire if the coach does not interfere with the play in any manner.

Although called "boxes," the coaching area actually consists of three line segments meeting at right angles. Per MLB rules, the longest side, parallel to the foul line, must be 20 feet (6.1 m) long and the shorter sides, perpendicular to the foul line, can range from 1 to 10 feet (0.30 to 3.05 m) long. The boxes are located 15 feet (4.6 m) from the respective foul lines. The end furthest from the home plate must be 90 feet (27 m) from home plate, the same distance as first and third base.

== Basketball ==
In basketball, it is a line that represents how far a coach may come towards centercourt and away from the sideline. The NCAA introduced a coach's box before the 1984–85 season. During the 2017–18 NCAA basketball season, the coach's box was expanded to allow coaches to stand 38 feet (12 m) from the baseline. Although the rule has been somewhat loosely enforced, stepping outside of the box is a technical foul. In the National Basketball Association, from coaches may walk from the substitution box line, which ends 4 feet (1.2 m) before the midcourt line, to the baseline.

== See also ==
- Baseball field § Coach's boxes
