= Turf management =

Work needed to keep a sporting pitch ready for use

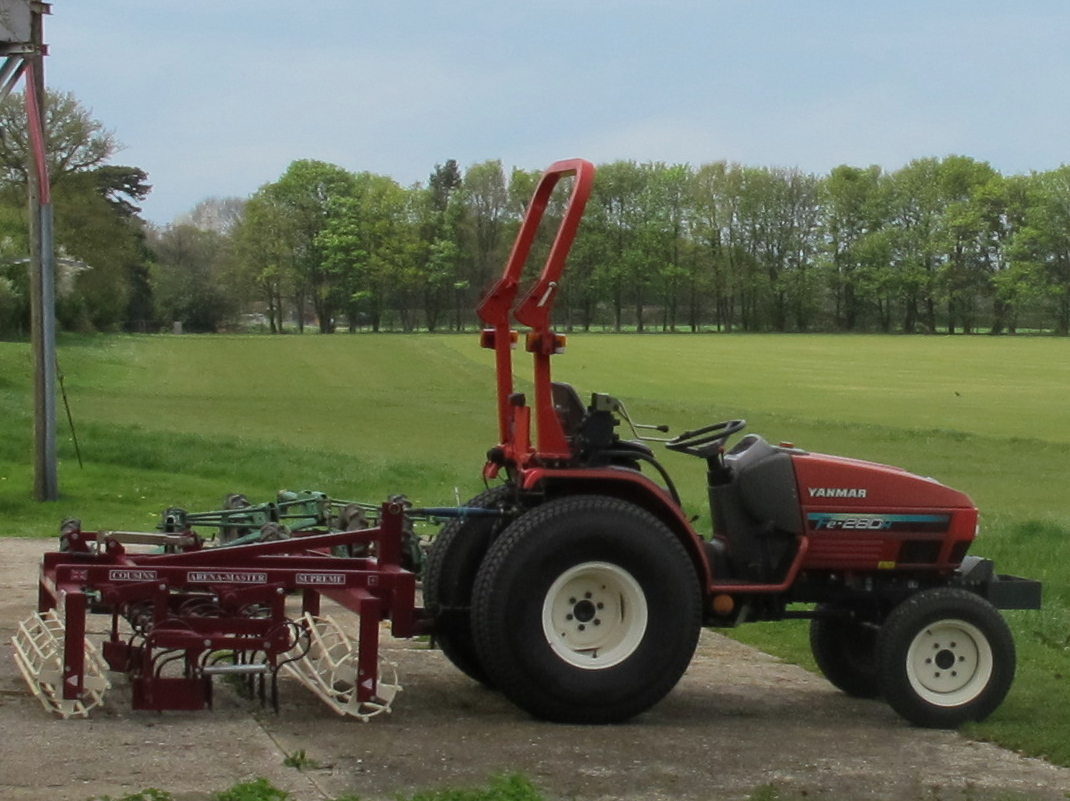
Turf management equipment

Turf management is the science and practice of establishing, maintaining, and improving natural and artificial turf surfaces used for sports, recreation, and other managed landscapes. Turf management integrates principles of agronomy, horticulture, soil science, irrigation and pest management to produce safe, durable, and high-quality playing surfaces. It is commonly practiced on tennis courts, golf courses, athletic fields, parks and residential or commercial properties.

== Principles of turf management ==
The skills needed vary considerably dependent upon the sport, environment, climate and construction. Special sets of skills are also needed to care for either sand-based athletic fields or native soil fields or to use organic turf management. Most programs incorporate several common management practices and principles intended to promote turf health, playability, and longevity.

Common principles include selecting turfgrass species and cultivars appropriate to environmental conditions and anticipated use, monitoring soil conditions through testing to guide nutrient management, applying irrigation practices that balance turf quality with efficient water use, and implementing mowing programs appropriate for the turf species and desired playing surface. Additional practices include aeration and thatch management to improve soil structure and root development, integrated pest management (IPM) to address weeds, insects, and diseases, and renovation techniques such as overseeding or reestablishment to maintain turf density and playing conditions.

== Tennis courts ==
There are two main types of tennis court, grass and clay. The clay courts can then be divided into natural clay, hard courts and fast/dry courts.

All tennis courts should ideally be a little west of true north to ensure minimum problems from sunlight.

- Grass courts. Historically very popular, they are now slowly being replaced by clay courts which offer the opportunity of year-round usage and lower maintenance.

The skills needed to maintain a grass court are considerable. Traditionally the court is split into the foundations and drainage, the soil or binding layer, and the grass. All three must work together to provide the best playing surface. Maintenance of grass courts is typically split into the following areas:

- Mowing, 6 to 8 mm.
- Fertilisers.
- Scarification: mechanically raising the surface turf to prevent compaction.
- Rolling. Usually done in springtime to correct any problems from the winter weather.
- Aeration. Winter work to remedy compaction over the summer. It will encourage deep rooting as well as assisting in drainage.
- Seeding of worn areas after the season has ended.
- Top dressing at the end of the season to maintain turf quality.

Artificial grass courts are a popular option at club level as they are weather resistant and their shock absorbing qualities help limit injuries. However they are not recommended for high skill levels and are expensive to maintain. The Lawn Tennis Association prices a basic court at £27,000 and replacement turf every 9 years at a further £11,000.

- Clay courts require water to keep from cracking. This limits their use in very dry regions. At the other extreme, in countries like the United Kingdom with very wet seasons, a clay court may be unplayable for long periods and may also give rise to expensive maintenance at the start of the season. Normal maintenance is basically regular watering and rolling, to prevent the surface turning into dust. Clay courts can have both sub-surface and above surface irrigation. They provide a good training surface with a medium to slow pace and consistent bounce. The Lawn Tennis Association prices the courts at between £34,000 and £60,000 to construct.
- Hard courts are typically made from asphalt or concrete with an acrylic covering. They are also called synthetic granular courts. These courts typically provide a "fast" game, which means the tennis ball will bounce with a low angle. The speed of the court can be changed by varying the amount of sand present in the covering. If a layer of cushioning material is added to a hard court then the performance increases and this is typical of an all-weather court. However, the cost of the cushioning can be substantial.

An interesting problem with asphalt courts arises in very hot environments. The asphalt absorbs heat very quickly, but the painted lines will reflect the heat and this differential in temperature can lead to surface cracking. These courts are generally low-maintenance but they need to be recoated every 5 to 10 years. Most maintenance involves keeping the surface clean. There is generally little movement in the surface which means added strain on ankles and knee joints.
The Lawn Tennis Association prices a porous macadam court at £20,000, which should last 10 to 12 years with low maintenance costs. An acrylic court would cost around £25,000 and is long lasting with low maintenance.

- "Fast/dry" courts are a relatively new innovation from America. These are generally made from basalt taken from the Blue Ridge Mountains of Virginia, which is then finely crushed and used as the top layer over either a purpose-built sub-layer or just placed on top of an existing clay or asphalt surface. This type of surface is promoted as allowing more "sliding" by the players and therefore it helps to limit tennis injuries to the lower parts of the body. These courts are typically slower than grass. They can dry very quickly and do not have the heat reflection problems of clay courts. Porosity is low and often these courts have a slight slope to aid water run off. They are similar to the basic clay courts described above.

== Golf courses ==
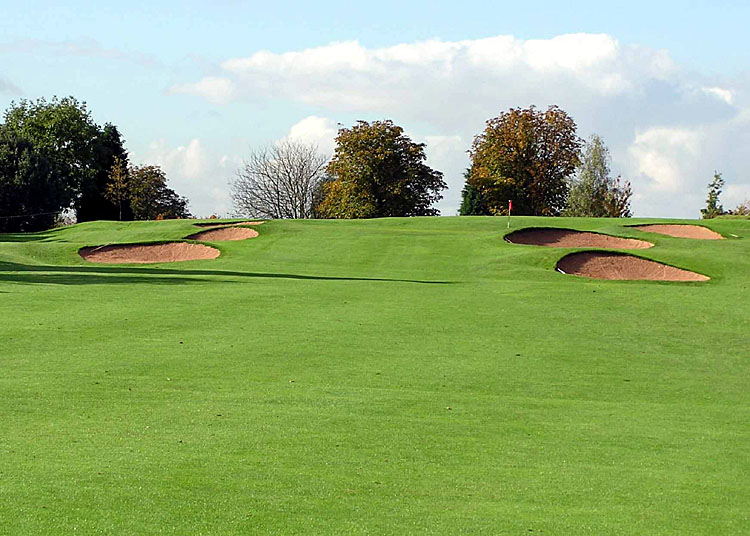
Bunkers at Filton Golf Club, Bristol, England

The growth in the popularity of golf, combined with the large sums of money invested in a golf course, has led to the development of turf management, which is a term used to refer to the skills of maintaining a golf course.

The green, as opposed to the rough, is the principal area of concern. Many golf courses are now built in environments which would be hostile to natural grass cover and essentially the grass grows in a hydroponic or sterile environment with very fast drainage. This means that it has to be fed and watered regularly.

The key characteristics of a good green are speed and consistency. Faster greens are preferred and for tournament play the greens should be as fast as possible. To measure speed a stimpmeter is used. The main factors influencing green speed are:

- Mowing height, which today is 3 to 6 mm. Due to the demand for faster greens, top courses are striving for even lower cutting heights. In the 1960s, green mowers were not capable of cutting below 6 mm; today they can cut below 3 mm.
- Rolling, though excessive rolling will compact the grass.
- Topdressing helps with consistency and reduces thatch buildup.
- Frequency of mowing. During the growing season daily mowing is required. For faster speeds and professional tournaments greens may be cut twice a day or even double cut (two cuts in two directions, one immediately following the other).
- Verticutting to remove excessive thatch, force the grass blades to stand upright, thin out excessive growth and speed up greens.
- Scarification to remove moss and stop the collection of moisture on the green.
- Grooming to reduce the thickness of clumps.
- Aerating to remove excessive organic matter, modify the rootzone composition, improve rooting and drainage.

== Football pitches ==
Historically football pitches have had natural grass cover. The stresses on a pitch, combined with winter weather, can often mean that the pitch has to be renovated on a regular basis. Essentially the existing turf is removed to a depth of typically 40 mm turf and 110 mm of soil. The replacement turf is ideally purpose grown to ensure consistency and freedom from weeds. A pitch can usually be returfed within four days and would typically involve removing and relaying 400 cubic metres of turf and soil. The FA lists four main characteristics of a good grass pitch:

- Adequate grass coverage
- Low level of weeds
- Flat
- Good drainage

Football pitch technology has moved forward tremendously since the 1970s/1980s, when it was found that by December, almost all pitches turned into mud baths. Today's technology includes the use of drainage pipe at 5m centres, a gravel raft, a sand (suspended water table) rooting zone, undersoil heating and supplementary lighting on the surface that encourages growth. Management techniques have also advanced, with more emphasis on soil and plant biology, morphology, and the zoology and physiology being introduced into the management of a grass sward. There are also a number of materials and methods to reinforce a natural grass playing surface.

As stadiums have been developed, and are generally now nearly sealed constructions, meaning there is less light and air movement on the playing surface, new processes and procedures have been introduced to counterbalance the effects of this.

Artificial grass offers an alternative to natural grass for football stadiums. There has been considerable development of this type of surface from the early days, when it was similar to tufted carpet. The performance of this surface has generally been questioned as not being truly natural. However, there are definite advantages with artificial grass, particularly when a stadium has heavy or multi-use requirements. Artificial grass also has an advantage in environments hostile to natural grass, for instance, low sunlight or a paucity of water.

== Cricket fields ==
Cricket fields, and cricket pitches in particular, require a good deal of care to ensure that they are not waterlogged with rain, which can create issues with the bounce of the ball off the pitch as it is delivered to the batsman (the pitch is said to become a "sticky wicket"), and make it unsafe for players to move around the field; bowlers in particular risk damaging themselves if they slip during their delivery stride. For these reasons, play is often stopped when rain occurs, with most of the field covered to prevent it from getting wet.

Before play and during breaks, the pitch is swept over and otherwise maintained to improve its performance.

== Athletics tracks ==
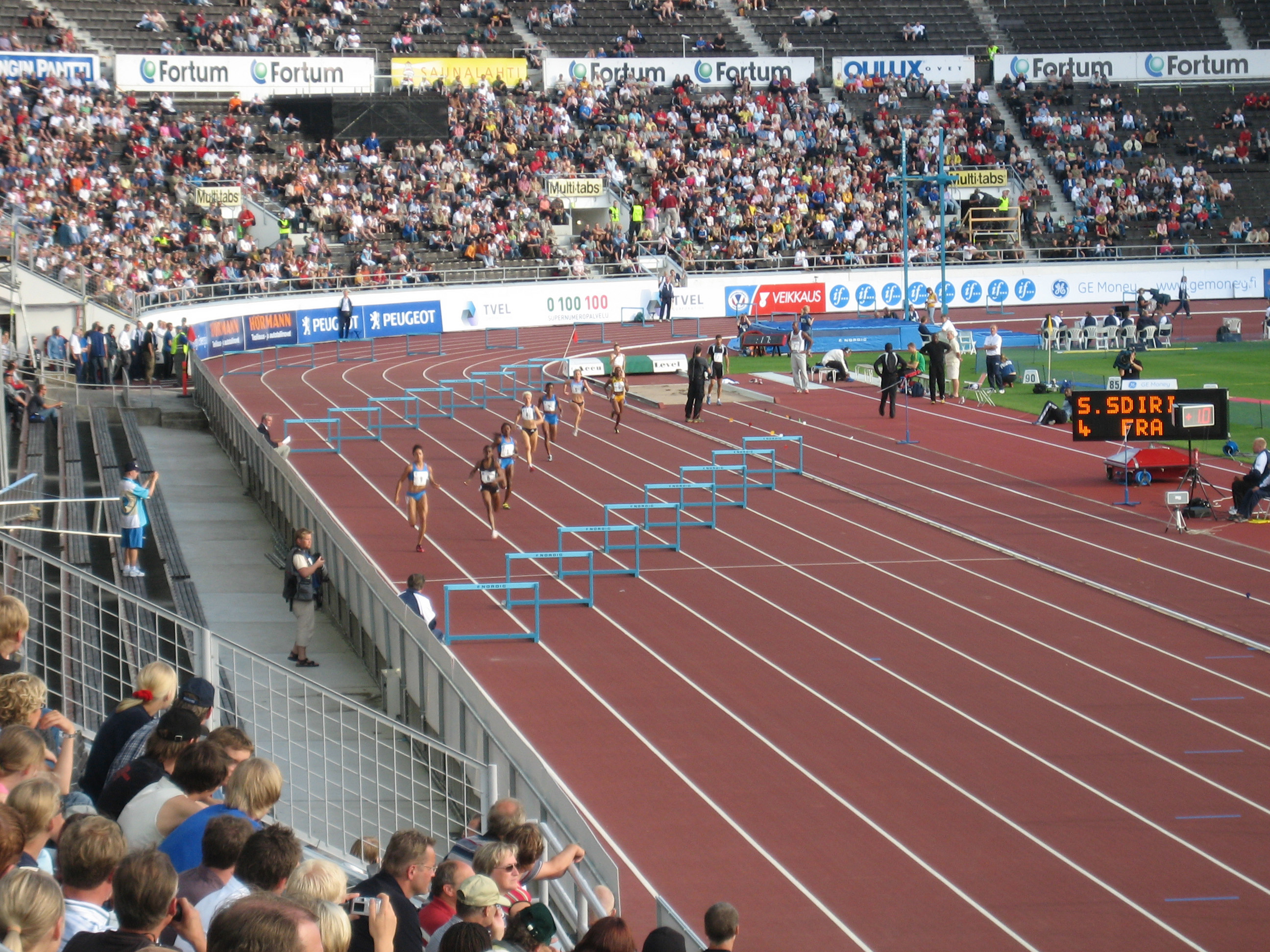
Typical outdoor red rubber track

Modern athletics tracks use "polymeric surfaces". Because of their hardwearing and porous nature they allow the facility to look attractive and well-kept at all times, although actual maintenance is low.

== See also ==
- Groundskeeping
- Sports turf
- Organic lawn management
