= Grass court =

Type of tennis court

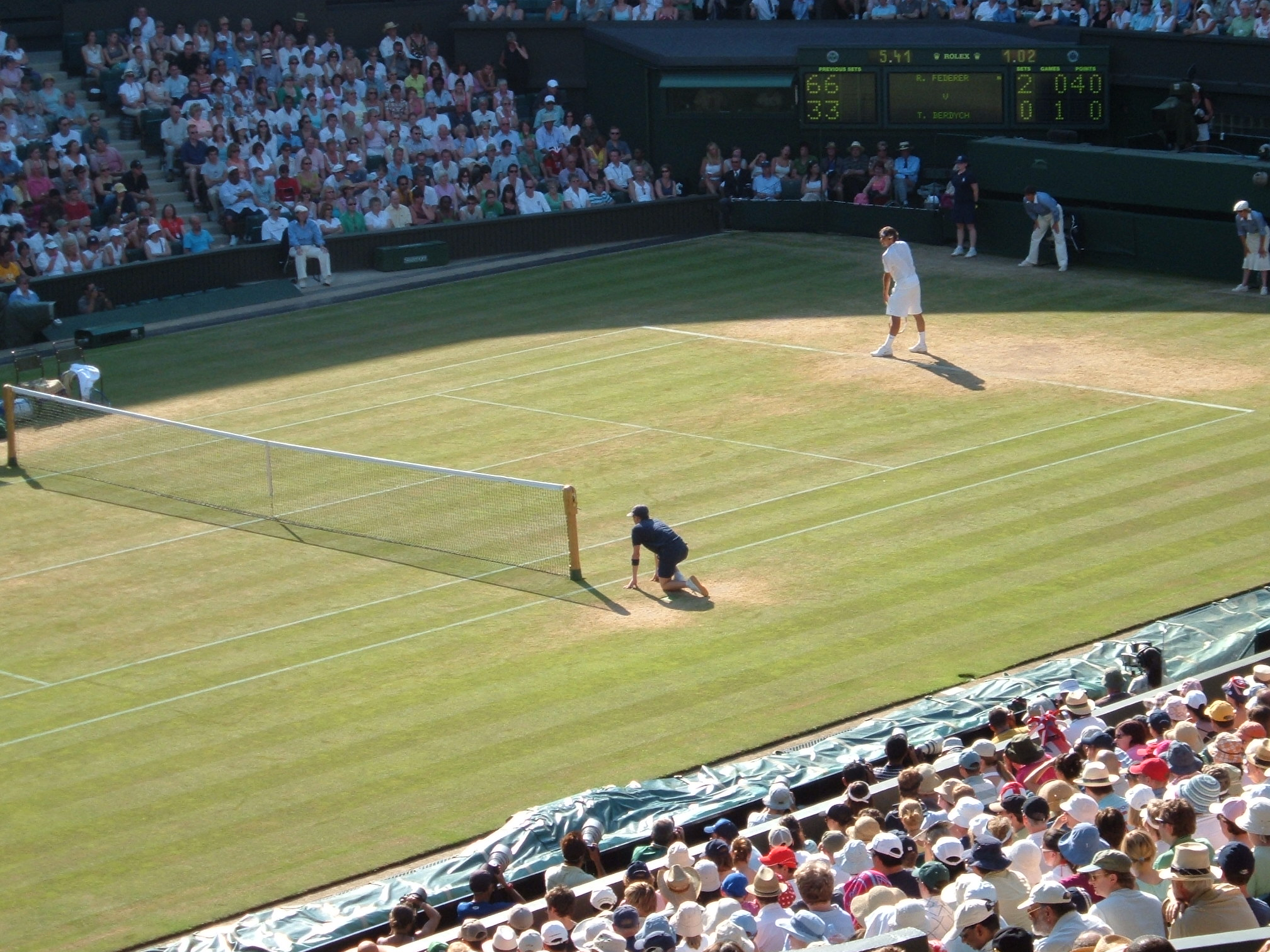
Roger Federer playing on the grass at Centre Court in the 2006 Wimbledon Championships

A grass court is one of the types of tennis court on which the sport of tennis, originally known as "lawn tennis", is played. Grass courts are made of grasses in different compositions depending on the tournament.

While grass courts are more traditional than other types of tennis courts, they are far less commonly used today compared to hard courts and clay courts. There are several disadvantages with grass courts: in particular, they are much more expensive to maintain compared to other surfaces. Also, grass courts (in the absence of suitable covers) are usually unplayable for the day if rain appears, as grass becomes very slippery when wet and will not dry for many hours. In contrast, play on a hard court can resume in 30 to 120 minutes after the end of rain, and clay courts can even remain playable in light rain. Furthermore, since most of the foot traffic during a tennis match occurs repetitively over a small surface area of the court, even with the best maintenance a grass surface will quickly display obvious signs of wear if played regularly, which is unavoidable during a major tennis tournament.

Grass courts are most common in the United Kingdom and Australia. Since 1988, the Wimbledon Championships have been the only Grand Slam tournament played on grass.

== Play style ==
Because grass courts tend to be slippery, the ball often skids and bounces low while retaining most of its speed, rarely rising above knee height. In addition, there are often bad bounces. As a result, players must reach the ball faster relative to other surfaces, and rallies are likely to be comparatively brief; therefore, speed and power are rewarded on grass. On grass, the serve and return play a major part in determining the outcome of the point, increasing the importance of serving effectively, and maintaining focus in exchanges which can be heavily influenced by lapses in concentration. A grass court favours a serve and volley style of play.

== Players ==
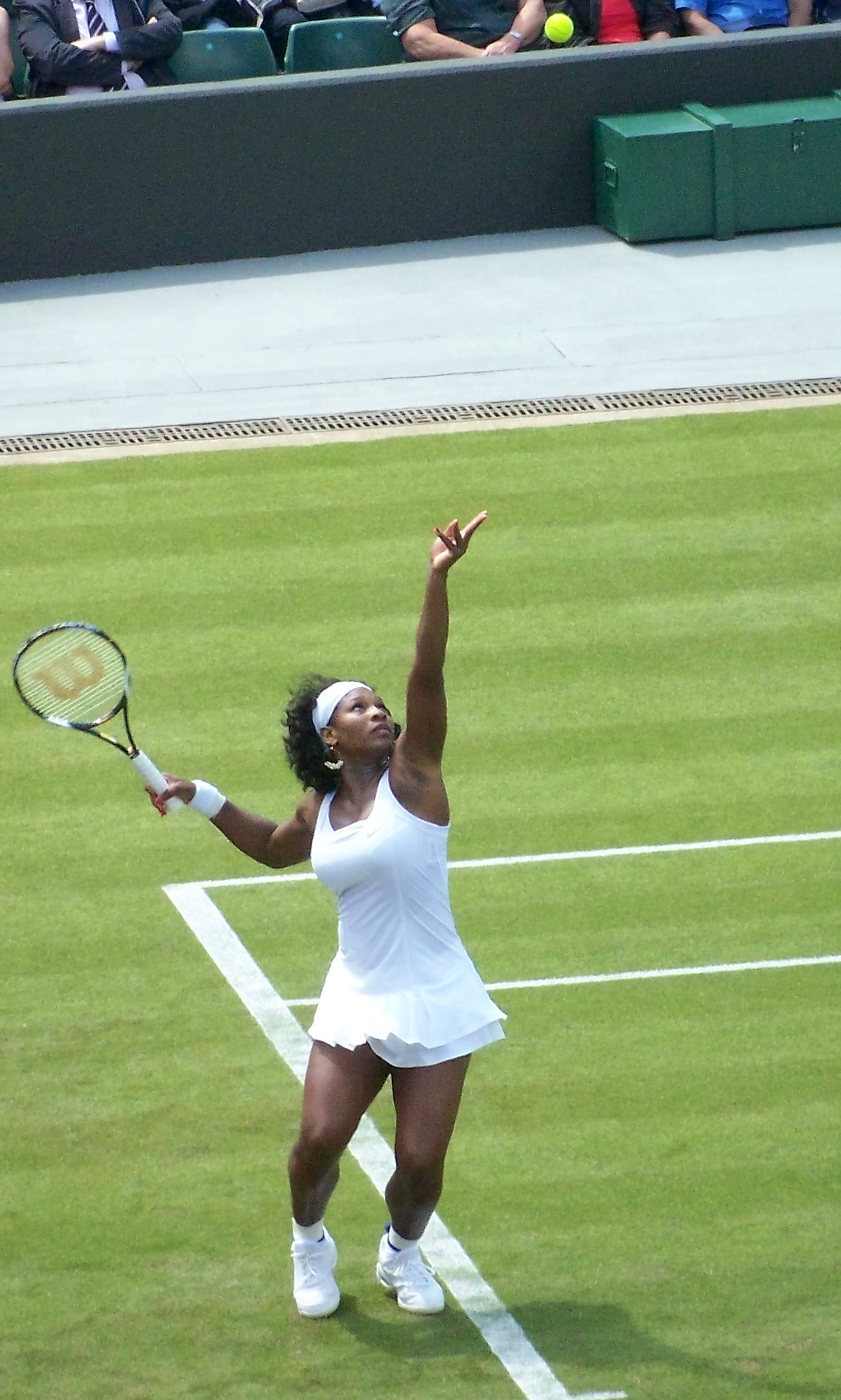
Serena Williams serving at the 2008 Wimbledon Championships.

The most successful singles players on grass in the Open Era have been Martina Navratilova, Roger Federer, Margaret Court, Billie Jean King, Pete Sampras, Steffi Graf, Serena Williams, Novak Djokovic, Rod Laver, John Newcombe, Evonne Goolagong Cawley, Björn Borg, Chris Evert, and Venus Williams. All have won at least five major singles titles on grass: Navratilova won twelve, Federer and Court eight each, Djokovic, King, Sampras, Graf and Serena Williams seven each. Other players who have been successful on grass during the Open Era include Arthur Ashe, Ken Rosewall, Boris Becker, John McEnroe, Stefan Edberg, Virginia Wade, Rafael Nadal, Petra Kvitová, Carlos Alcaraz and Andy Murray.

Among men, Sampras is lauded by many tennis analysts as one of the greatest grass-court players of all time. He won seven Wimbledon singles titles in eight years from 1993 through 2000, with his only loss in that span coming in the 1996 quarterfinals. Roger Federer is statistically the most successful male grass court player of the Open Era: he has won an Open Era-record 19 grass court titles, including ten Halle Open titles, an all-time record eight Wimbledon singles titles, and a Stuttgart Open title. Federer has contested an all-time record twelve Wimbledon singles finals, and has the longest grass court winning streak in the Open Era, when he won 65 consecutive matches between 2003 and 2008, until he was defeated by Rafael Nadal in the 2008 Wimbledon final. Additionally, Novak Djokovic has had significant success at Wimbledon in the 2010s and beyond – winning the tournament seven times, including defeating Federer three times in the final of Wimbledon in 2014, 2015 and 2019.

The most successful active female grass-court player is Venus Williams, with five Wimbledon singles titles. Venus has won five out of her nine Wimbledon finals appearances (losing three to her sister, Serena), and the pair have won six titles in the ladies' doubles together.

== Professional tournaments played on grass ==
Compared to clay and hard courts, the professional grass court season is much shorter. Until 2014, it consisted only of Wimbledon, two weeks of tournaments in Britain and continental Europe leading up to it, and the Hall of Fame Tennis Championships at Newport, Rhode Island, United States the week after. In 2015 it was extended, with an extra week between the French Open and Wimbledon. On the ATP Tour, the Stuttgart Open became a grass court tournament that year. In 2017 a new ATP 250 tournament in Antalya, Turkey, was played a week before Wimbledon. On the WTA Tour Mallorca, Spain, began hosting a grass court tournament beginning in 2016.

Two of the four Grand Slam events switched from grass to hardcourt; the US Open was last played on grass in 1974 (clay: 1975–1977), and the Australian Open was last held on grass courts in January 1987.

=== Summer grass season ===
ATP	WTA
Grand Slam tournaments
ATP Tour 500	WTA 500
ATP Tour 250	WTA 250

Week	ATP	WTA
Week 1	Stuttgart Open (Stuttgart, Germany)	Queen's Club Championships (London, United Kingdom)
Week 1	Rosmalen Grass Court Championships ('s-Hertogenbosch, Netherlands)	
Week 2	Halle Open (Halle, Germany); Queen's Club Championships (London, United Kingdom)	Grass Court Championships Berlin (Berlin, Germany)
Week 2	Halle Open (Halle, Germany); Queen's Club Championships (London, United Kingdom)	Nottingham Open (Nottingham, United Kingdom)
Week 3	Mallorca Championships (Santa Ponsa, Spain)	Bad Homburg Open (Bad Homburg, Germany)
Week 3	Eastbourne International (Eastbourne, United Kingdom)	
Week 4	Wimbledon (London, United Kingdom)	
Week 5	Wimbledon (London, United Kingdom)	

== See also ==
- Clay court
- Hard court
- Carpet court
- Wood court
