= Sand-based athletic fields =

Sports fields constructed on sand-surfaces

Sand-based athletic fields are sports turf playing fields constructed on top of sand surfaces. It is important that turf managers select the most suitable type of sand when constructing these fields, as sands with different shapes offer varied pros and cons. Regular maintenance of sand-based athletic fields is just as important as the initial construction of the field. As water and other aqueous solutions (fungicides, herbicides, and pesticides) are added, a layer of thatch may accumulate on the surface of the turf. There are different ways to manage this level of thatch, however the most common are aeration and vertical mowing.

Sand-based athletic fields are utilized by many professional sporting facilities as they provide efficient drainage, thus allowing games and matches to be played during rainfall. Improved filtration is also imperative to the prevention of common fungal diseases that occur in sports turf. An excess of availability of nutrients can expedite the occurrence of these diseases, as well as increase the severity of the disease. Diseases such as;

- Dollar spot (Sclerotinia homeocarpa)
- Summer patch (Magnaporthe poae)
- Red thread disease (Laetisaria fuciformis)

are commonly associated with prolonged periods of precipitation, followed by warm temperatures. Improving the speed at which water can filter through the soil, minimizes the time that pathogens have to accumulate in the turf. A turf manager must be able to identify the speed of water filtration, as timely irrigation patterns are essential in water management.

== Choice of soil ==
Highly maintained areas of grass, such as those on an athletic field or on golf greens and tees, can be grown in native soil or sand-based systems. There are advantages and disadvantages to both that need to be considered before deciding what type of soil to grow turf in. Native soils offer many positive qualities, such as high nutrient holding capacity, water holding capacity, and sure footing. However, native soil fields are typically very poorly drained. This causes problems with growing turf and maintaining a safe surface for players. Sand-based systems provide all of the above qualities, and also improved drainage. They allow the turf manager better control over moisture management and resist soil compaction.

== Construction ==
Sand-based systems are composed of a sand-based root zone, often a gravel layer, and a drainage pipe (tile) system. Although the root zone of a sand-based system is mostly sand, additives can be included to increase the organic matter content and add stability to the root zone. Peat is a common root zone additive used, but other organic and inorganic additives can also be used. Peat has the ability to increase water and nutrient holding capacity and decrease bulk density. A common ratio of sand to peat ranges from 9.5:5 to 8:2. These ratios will allow a water holding capacity of 15 to 26% and increase nutrient holding capacity greatly.

100% sand root zones are used often and are more cost effective from a construction standpoint. Selection of the type of sand is very crucial, as there are variations in particle size and shape. One main type being rounded sands, that provide efficient filtration for water and other aqueous solutions, enabling the turf to take more rainfall. The downside of rounded sands is that their shape prohibits them from forming a firm seedbed. This makes the turf less durable which can be problematic for highly trafficked areas during sporting seasons. Another type is angular sands, that are able to provide this firm seed bed, thus establishing durable turf. Angular sands achieve this firmness as they are able to settle and form together more efficiently than rounded sands. However, because of this firmness, angular sands do have the potential to cut into roots, thus inhibiting water and nutrient uptake and leaving the turf susceptible to plant pathogens. Both types of sands have potential pros and cons, but in the end, it is up to the turf manager to determine which type of sand will be most beneficial to the turf. Once a sand is selected and it is determined if a soil conditioner will be used, the layout of the root zone profile must be determined.

In the United States, common specifications for constructing a sand-based system are laid out by the United States Golf Association (USGA) and by ASTM International (American Society of Testing and Materials, ASTM F2396 Standard Guide for Construction of High Performance Sand-Based Rootzones for Athletic Fields). The USGA specifications used for a sand-based athletic field are the same as what is typically used for USGA golf greens. These specifications consist of a 12 to 16 inch sand root zone. The choice of sand type and the addition of an amendment depend on the designer. When an amendment is used, it must be thoroughly incorporated with the sand. The sand overlays a 4-inch gravel layer. This creates a perched water table above the gravel that helps keep the root zone moist during dry conditions. A drainage system is installed below the gravel to carry excess water away from the field. ASTM F2396 methods are more flexible in design and instead of a set specification gives guidance on selecting sand for a more varied range in construction methods. For example, with or without a gravel drainage layer, with or without peat and/or soil amendment, and profile depth variance from 8 to 16+ inches.

== Aeration and topdressing ==
Aeration on a sand-based system is used more to control the thickness of the thatch layer than to relieve compaction. Thatch layers are the accumulation of decomposed vegetative parts of grass plants like stolons and rhizomes at the surface level. A thick thatch layer on a sand-based athletic field may prevent nutrients and water from reaching the soil. Further, fertilizers, fungicides, and insecticides can not penetrate the surface and reach the soil. This can obviously be devastating if a field is consumed by a soil borne disease or insect. Water penetration can also be deterred by a thick thatch layer. When there is a thick mat of organic matter near the surface of a field a second perched water table will form. This will cause roots to stay in the top couple of inches of soil because they do not need to search for water at greater depths. Without a deep root system, a field can become unsafe due to footing issues.

One method of thatch control is core aerification. This is the process of tilling the field with hollow tines to remove thatch from the surface. Tines used in aerification are hollow, measuring a half inch in diameter, and typically reach a depth of four inches into the turf. If the holes are on 2 inch center, 36 holes will be punched per square foot. After a field is aerified, the cores can either be raked up and removed, or left on the surface to break down. Once a field is aerified, and there are holes in the surface, a field should be topdressed with the same sand that was used in the construction of the field. Refilling the aerification holes with sand improves the macroporosity of the soil and allows better penetration of water. This will allow the turf manager to water deeper and therefore improve the root system. Introducing sand into the thatch layer allows the growth media to be suitable for play. Without sand mixed with the thatch layer, divots would readily kick out and the field would not be safe for any type of sport.

Another common method of reducing thatch is vertical mowing. This consists of vertical blades tearing into the soil and pulling out organic matter. This can lead to a long recovery time for the turf. Reducing the amount of thatch at the surface allows nutrients and pesticides to penetrate into the soil.

== Nutrient management ==
Nutrient management is essential in maintaining a healthy stand of turfgrass, and is much more difficult to achieve effectively in a sand-based system. Unlike with native soil fields, leaching of nutrients is a major concern when managing a sand-based turf system.

Nutrient leaching occurs more readily in a sand-based system because sand has a relatively low cation-exchange capacity (CEC). This refers to the sand's ability to retain nutrient particles. Soil particle "hold on" to positively charged nutrient particles because they are negatively charged. The opposite charges cause the nutrients to adhere to soil particles which can then be taken up by plants. Sand has virtually no CEC, whereas clay and organic matter have relatively high CEC. This means that the higher the clay and organic matter of a soil, the more nutrients it will hold.

Low CEC is a major concern when an athletic field is constructed with 100% sand because substantial amounts of nutrients will be unavailable to the turf. The pure sand base will not hold on to nutrients until there is substantial organic matter incorporated into the soil to keep nutrients from leaching. Eventually, organic matter levels will rise as the plants begin to mature and dead vegetative matter decomposes.

The best way to avoid this problem is to incorporate some type of organic matter into the root zone mix during construction. The most common, as noted above, is peat moss. Mixing peat moss into the root zone mixture greatly increases nutrient holding capacity. This will greatly increase the chances of establishing a healthy stand of turfgrass because the soil will be able to retain both nutrients and water.

Because the nutrient holding capacity is low, soil tests are crucial for sand-based athletic fields. Soil tests should be taken frequently to measure what nutrients are lacking. Fertility programs should then be based on the soil tests. Unlike a native soil field, where most nutrients that are applied stay in the soil, sand-based fields nutrient status fluctuates. That is why a yearly fertilizer program can not be followed. It is more important to obtain soil tests during the establishment of a new field because organic matter will be low and amounts of nutrients will fluctuate even more.

== Water management ==
One of the many advantages of sand-based systems is extremely good drainage. A well constructed sand-based system can drain excessive amounts of rainfall very quickly. The good drainage that sand-based systems exhibit also offer the turf manager better control over soil water content.

The large size of sand particles allow water to flow freely which, in turn, allows sand-based system to drain extremely well. This is beneficial because it allows fields to be used during inclement weather. Sand-based systems will drain multiple inches of water within a short period of time. This allows a sporting event to be played through a rain or after a short delay. Native soil fields, on the other hand, do not drain well and many games have to be cancelled or postponed due to puddling on the field.

The good drainage of a sand-based system allows turf managers better control over their irrigation. Once the turf manager learns how his/her field drains, they will know, fairly accurately, when the field will need water. This allows them to make an irrigation plan that provides the turf with just enough water to maintain its health.

Localized dry spots, more commonly known as hot spots, are a common occurrence on sand-based turf systems. Hot spots are small areas of turf that are dry and often become hydrophobic. They can be first seen when the grass plants in the area begin to wilt. If the hot spot is not taken care of, the turf in that area will eventually die. Once the soil becomes hydrophobic, it is very hard to get water to penetrate. The best way to alleviate a hot spot is through long, light irrigation or rainfall. It may also help to use a pitchfork to poke holes into the soil to increase percolation.
