= BlockWorks =

Design collective within Minecraft

BlockWorks is a design collective that produces architectural projects in the sandbox game Minecraft. The company was involved in the design of The Uncensored Library, published by Reporters Without Borders in 2020, which highlights censored reporting from different countries. Corporate and institutional partnerships, including with Minecraft owner Microsoft and the Museum of London, have garnered media attention.

== Activities ==
BlockWorks was founded in 2013 by a group of four friends, including James Delaney of London, who became its managing director. They started the company after noticing how much amount of money popular Minecraft multiplayer servers and Minecraft-playing YouTubers were given in donations by that time. Delaney later studied at the University of Cambridge's department of architecture and trained in neoclassical architecture. The group designs maps within Minecraft's "Creative Mode", a gameplay mode which removes threats normally present in the game's "Survival Mode", with the aid of mods such as WorldEdit and Voxelsniper. By 2016, the company had grown from four people to a team of 42.

A coffee table book of the company's creations, Beautiful Minecraft, was published by No Starch Press.

=== The Uncensored Library ===
The Uncensored Library is a Minecraft server and map released by Reporters Without Borders (RSF) and created by BlockWorks, DDB Berlin, and .monks as an attempt to circumvent censorship in countries without freedom of the press. The library contains banned reporting from the United States, Mexico, Russia, Vietnam, Saudi Arabia, Egypt, Brazil, Belarus, Iran, and Eritrea. An entire wing is given to each country, each containing several banned articles placed in virtual books. The library was released on 12 March 2020, the World Day Against Cyber Censorship. The two ways to access the library are to download a map from the official website, or to connect to their Minecraft server.

BlockWorks' team of 24 people built the library in around 250 hours. The New York Times observed that Delaney had the library "styled like a Grecian temple, encircled by columns and formal gardens."

=== Other partnerships ===
In partnership with the Royal Institute of British Architects, BlockWorks held a brief "Brutalist Build" event in 2015 in which a public multiplayer server was hosted for players to construct Brutalist creations. For an exhibition at the Museum of London in 2016, the company created a map which models the Great Fire of London. The company also produced maps to promote films for Warner Bros. Pictures and Walt Disney Pictures in 2015 and 2016.

BlockWorks began regularly working on projects for Minecraft owner Microsoft in 2015; this included a map featured at Microsoft's presentation at the 2016 E3 trade show and a map on the "Seven Wonders of the Ancient World" for Minecraft: Education Edition. Minecraft changed its guidelines in 2016 to forbid companies from having maps or other Minecraft content produced solely for brand promotion. Later projects included a map modelling Microsoft's planned upgrades to the headquarters campus in 2018; a theme park map for Minecraft creator Mojang Studios to celebrate the game's 10th anniversary in 2019; and a map designed for the band Disclosure's 2020 album Energy.
