= Base Design =

Base
- Type: Private
- Industry: Graphic design
- Founded: Brussels (1993)
- Headquarters: Brussels; New York City; Geneva; Melbourne; Ho Chi Minh City
- Website: basedesign.com

Base Design is an international network of creative studios founded in 1993. The company operates studios in Brussels, New York City, Geneva, Melbourne and Ho Chi Minh City.

== History ==
Base was founded in 1993 in Brussels by Thierry Brunfaut, Dimitri Jeurissen, and Juliette Cavenaile. The studio began as a graphic design practice producing work for cultural and public institutions in Belgium.

The group expanded internationally in 1998 with the opening of BaseNYC. From late 2001 to 2003, Base designed and produced BEople, “a magazine about a certain Belgium.” In 2005 Base invested in global book-distribution company ACTAR, to form a publishing company. The first book from BuratPublishing was a monograph of artist Maria Ozawa entitled "Are You Experienced to Fuck me?", and was released in 2009. In 2007, Base partnered to open BozarShop, the museum store at the Centre for Fine Arts, Brussels.

The group expanded in Geneva in 2012 with BaseGVA, in Melbourne in 2021 with BaseMEL, and BaseDGTL in 2022 to formalize the group’s digital work. BaseSGN opened in Saigon (Ho Chi Minh City) in 2025.

== Notable work and clients ==
Base Design has produced brand and communication work for organizations in the cultural, commercial and public sectors. Its clients have included Apple, Uniqlo, Uber, Fondation Louis Vuitton, the Museum of Modern Art (MoMA), The New York Times, KANAL Centre Pompidou, Institut Français de la Mode, Studio Museum in Harlem, La Monnaie, Meatpacking District, La Galérie Dior, Mecca, Suntory, 12 Matcha, Caudalie, La Prairie, Kit, Bongénie, DoorDash, the Biennale of Sydney, the Art Gallery of South Australia, Caran d’Ache, QoQa, the New York Mets, the Prince Estate, the Rock & Roll Hall of Fame, and JFK Terminal 4.

== Awards ==
Base Design has received recognition from international design, digital and branding award programs. Its work has been honored by organizations including the PRINT Awards, D&AD, The One Show, the ADC Annual Awards, the Webby Awards, the Type Directors Club, AIGA’s 365: Year in Design, the Lovie Awards, Awwwards, CSS Design Awards, the Architecture and Design Collection Awards, the Transform Awards, the AGDA Awards, the Designers Institute of New Zealand Best Design Awards, Creative Belgium Awards and 100 Beste Plakate.

Base Design’s digital work has also been featured on curated platforms including siteInspire, Hoverstat.es, Minimal Gallery and 404 Foundation.

Base Design’s work has been covered in international design and business publications, including Brand New (UnderConsideration), It’s Nice That, Creative Review, PRINT Magazine, Creative Boom, Fast Company, AdAge, Forbes, The Brand Identity, Transform Magazine, PAGE Magazin and Dieline.
