= Bic Cristal =

Disposable ballpoint pen

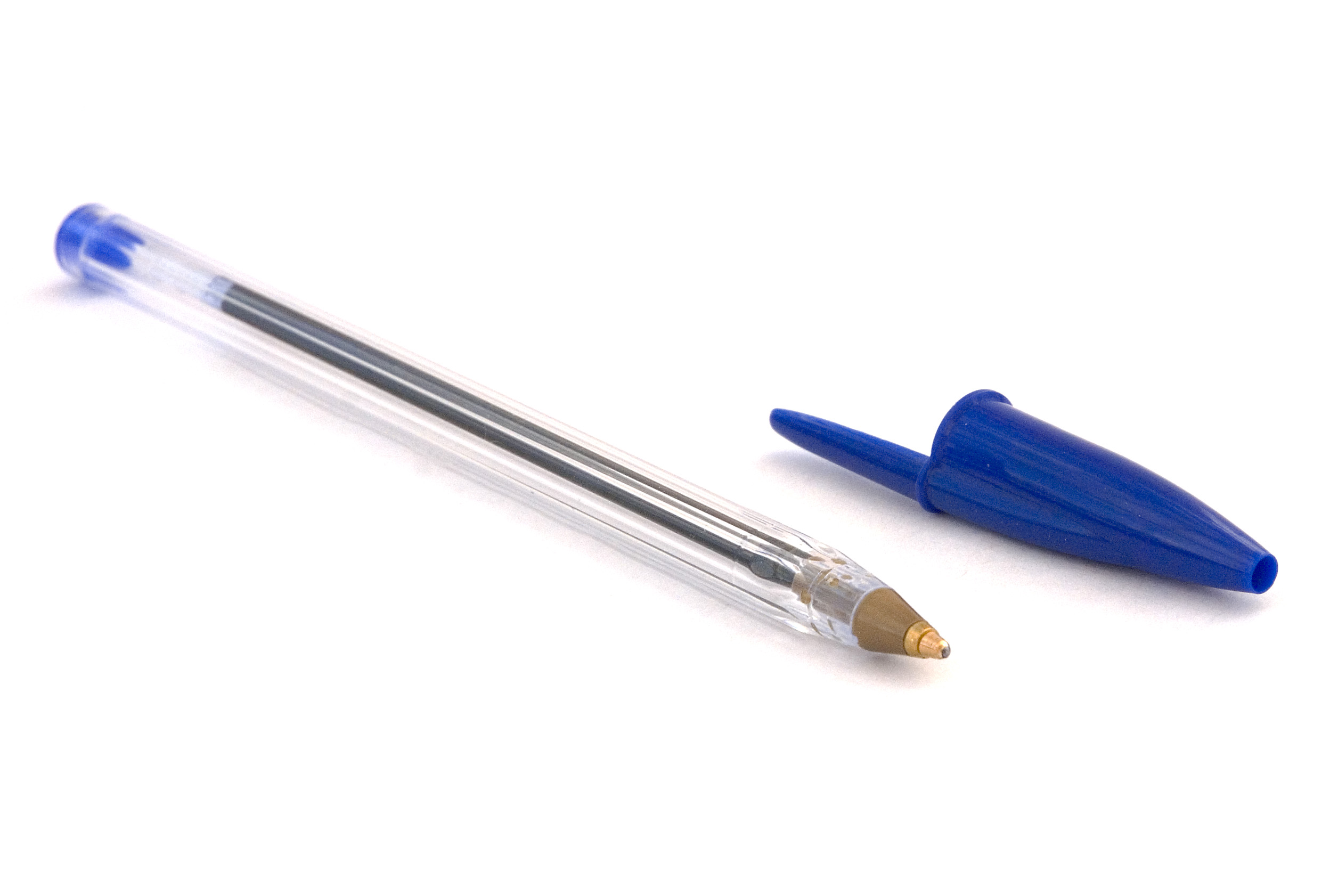
- Inventor: Marcel Bich
- Inception: 1950; 76 years ago
- Website: www.bicworld.com/en/our-products/stationery

The Bic Cristal (stylised as BiC Cristal and also known as the Bic Biro) is an inexpensive, disposable ballpoint pen mass-produced and sold by Société Bic of Clichy, Hauts-de-Seine, France. It was introduced in 1950 and is the best-selling pen in the world, with the 100 billionth sold in September 2006. It has become the archetypal ballpoint pen and is considered ubiquitous, to the extent that the Museum of Modern Art has made it a permanent part of its collection. Its hexagonal form and design mimics a standard pencil and it is sold in six types of point and 18 colors around the world.

== History ==
In 1930, László Bíró, a Hungarian-Argentine inventor observed children playing with marbles in a puddle, noticing that the marbles left a trail of water in their wake. Inspired by this observation, he conceived of a mechanism for a pen that used a ball-shaped metal nib to place ink onto a page. He shared his idea with his brother György, a chemist, and together they began researching and experimenting to create such a pen. Eventually, they developed a working prototype that used a viscous ink held in a narrow reservoir, with a tip containing a tiny ball that rotated freely. This design prevented the ink from drying out within the reservoir, and allowed for an even flow onto the page. They presented their invention at the Budapest International Fair in 1931 and patented it in 1938, although they did not market it immediately. With the start of World War II, the brothers migrated to Argentina, where they founded Biro Pens of Argentina. Their new pens were initially unsuccessful due to the high cost of the product, but gained a boost in popularity due to a contract with the British Air Force. In 1943, the Biro brothers licensed their invention to Eberhard Faber in the United States for $2 million. In 1944, entrepreneur Marcel Bich acquired the rights to Biro’s design. Near the end of the Second World War on the recommendation of an advertising expert, he dropped the "h" from his surname and founded the company BICGroup. He bought a factory in Clichy, a suburb north of Paris, and with business partner Edouard Buffard founded Société PPA (later Société Bic) in 1945. "PPA" stood for Porte-plume, Porte-mines et Accessoires; pens, mechanical pencils and accessories. During the war, Bich had seen the ballpoint pen manufactured in Argentina by László Bíró. Between 1949 and 1950, the Bic Cristal was designed by the Décolletage Plastique design team at Société PPA. Bich invested in Swiss technology capable of shaping metal down to 0.01 millimetres (0.00039 in), which could produce a stainless steel one-millimetre (0.039 in) sphere which allowed ink to flow freely. Bich developed an improved ink with a viscosity that neither leaked nor clogged and, under a ballpoint pen patent licensed from Bíró, launched the Cristal in December 1950.

Bich invested heavily in advertising, hiring poster designer Raymond Savignac in 1952, and won the French Oscar de la publicité award for advertising. In 1953, advertising executive Pierre Guichenné advised Bich to shorten his family name to Bic as an easy-to-remember, globally adaptable trade name for the pen, which fit in with product branding trends of the post-war era. Early Bic advertisements in France referred to the Cristal as the "Atomic pen". Throughout the 1950s and 1960s, the Bic Cristal's writing tip and ergonomic design helped shift the worldwide market for pens from fountain pens to ballpoints.

In 1959 Bich brought the pen to the American market: the Bic pen was soon selling at 29 cents (equivalent to $3.20 in 2025) with the slogan "writes first time, every time." In 1965, the French Ministry of Education approved the Bic Cristal for use in classrooms.

In 1961, the Bic Orange was introduced, featuring a fine 0.8 mm (0.031 in) point and an orange barrel instead of a translucent one. Bic manufactures this pen in its own plants in Europe.

In September 2006, the Bic Cristal was declared the best selling pen in the world after the 100 billionth was sold.

== Design ==
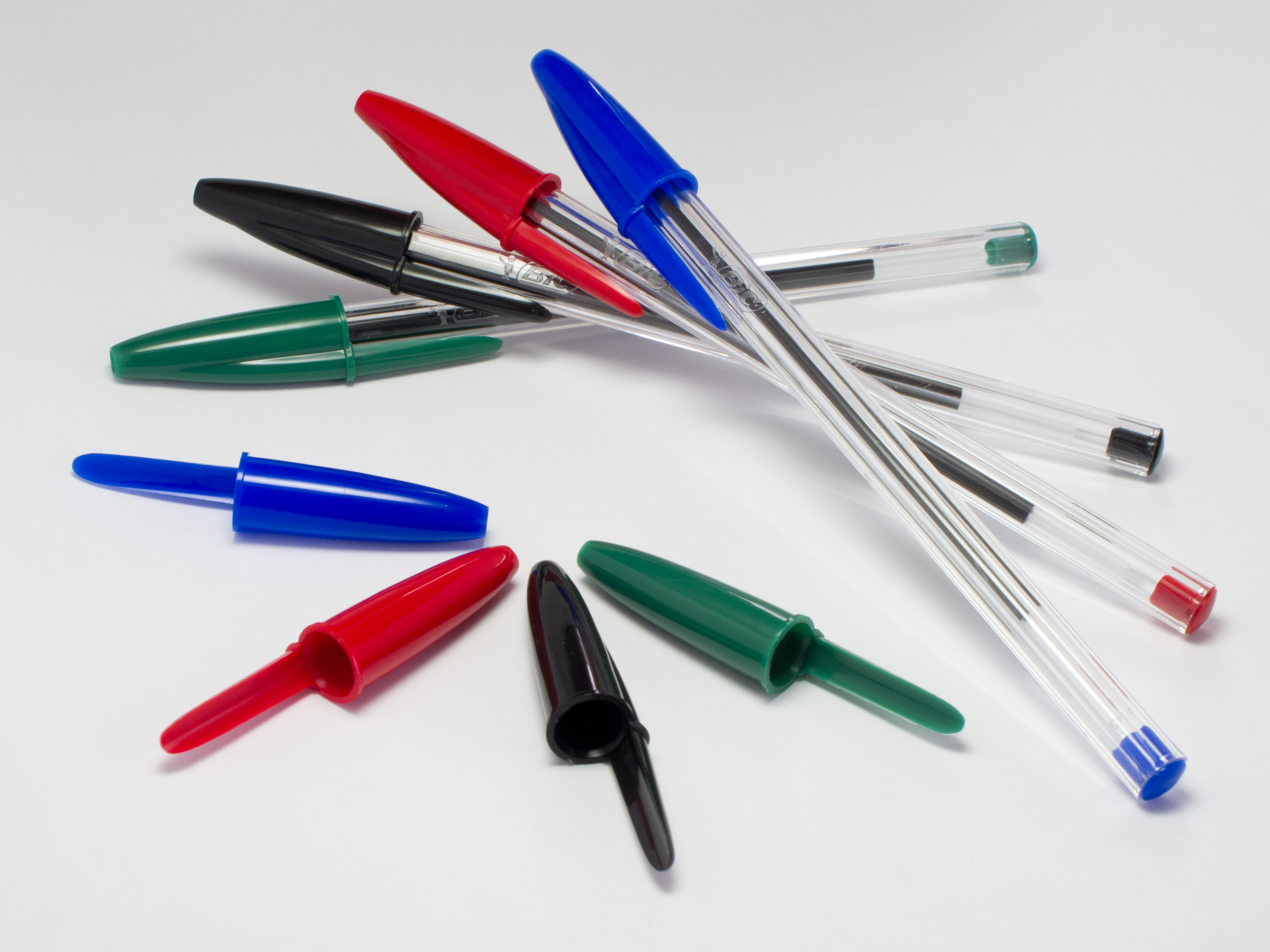
Four Bic Cristal pens and additional caps

The Museum of Modern Art in New York City (MoMA) recognised the Bic Cristal's industrial design by introducing it into the museum's permanent collection. Its hexagonal shape resembles the typical wooden pencil and grants strength and three grip points giving high writing stability. The pen's transparent polystyrene barrel and polypropylene tube show the ink-level. The only exception is the BIC Cristal UP, a pen marketed by Bic that supposedly creates more vivid lines when used. These pens have a white barrel and, depending on what color the ink reservoir contains, a small area of the pen barrel and cap with the corresponding ink color. A tiny hole in the barrel's body maintains the same air pressure inside and outside the pen. The pen is available in many different ink colors, ranging from the classic blue, black, red, and green of traditional offices, to pink, purple, and other modern and artistic colors. The thick ink flows down due to capillary action from the tube inside the barrel, to feed the ball, which can rotate within a brass bearing. In 1961, the originally stainless steel ball was replaced by a much harder tungsten carbide ball. It is first vitrified by heat, then ground down and milled to an accuracy of 0.1 μm (3.9×10^{−6} in) between spinning plates coated with industrial diamond abrasives. Since 1991 the pen's streamlined polypropylene cap has a small hole added, to reduce the risk of suffocation if the cap is inhaled. Polypropylene is used instead of polystyrene because it absorbs impact better, reducing the chance of the pen cracking or splitting if it is dropped onto the cap.

The pen's dimensions are 5 7/8 by 1/2 inch (14.9 cm × 1.3 cm) with the cap, or 5 11/16 by 1/4 inch (14.45 cm × 0.64 cm) without the cap.

The Cristal's design has been widely copied around the world, especially in the Far East. One Kenyan manufacturer of the Cristal reportedly lost 100 M KES (approx. 1.3 M USD at 2009 exchange rate) to cheap copies from China, forcing them to negotiate more affordable licensing from Bic.

In 2025, the Bic Cristal and the Décolletage Plastique design team were included in Pirouette: Turning Points in Design, an exhibition at MoMA featuring "widely recognized design icons [...] highlighting pivotal moments in design history."

== Spin-offs ==
In 1970 Bic introduced the "4 Colours" pen which includes four inks selectable by small spring-loaded levers within a single pen barrel.

In 2012, Bic marketed a spin-off product named the "Bic Cristal for Her". The pen, similar to the original, was supposedly designed specifically for women, and was sold in pink and purple colors. The product provoked outrage and ridicule, with television show host Ellen DeGeneres saying "Can you believe this? We've been using man pens all these years," and comedian Bridget Christie titling her 2013 Edinburgh festival show A Bic For Her. The product also received many sarcastic Amazon reviews. In 2017 it was inducted into the collection of the Museum of Failure.

In 2014 Bic released a new writing instrument based on the Cristal, a modified pen with a rubber tip opposite the ballpoint. This model, called the "Cristal Stylus", is for use on touchscreens. Bic funded a website to promote the stylus that crowdsourced a new typeface, named the Universal Typeface Experiment.

== See also ==
- List of pen types, brands and companies
- List of works in the Museum of Modern Art
