= Décolletage Plastique design team =

1950s French industrial design group

Décolletage Plastique design team, or simply Décolletage Plastique, is the name of the French design studio that developed the original 1950s BiC Cristal ballpoint pen, an object that the Museum of Modern Art (MoMA) describes as "a humble masterpiece and the best-selling pen in history." The studio was formed in Clichy, France in 1945, a year after the foundation of the Société PPA, which would later become Société BIC.

The pen and related archival material are in MoMA's collection, and in 2025, the Décolletage Plastique design team and the BiC Cristal were featured in Pirouette: Turning Points in Design, an exhibition of "widely recognized design icons ... highlighting pivotal moments in design history."

In addition to MoMA, examples of the work of Décolletage Plastique are in the Museum of Design in Plastics, the Design Museum Brussels, and the Pompidou Centre in Paris.
