= The Uncensored Library =

Minecraft server and map

- Developers: Berlin DDB, BlockWorks, .monks, Reporters Without Borders (Note: Berlin DDB and BlockWorks built the structure of the library, while .monks and Reporters without Borders published the project, the latter also selecting the articles displayed within the library.)
- Release: March 12, 2020; 6 years ago
- Type: Minecraft server & map
- Website: uncensoredlibrary.com; visit.uncensoredlibrary.com (server IP)

The Uncensored Library is a Minecraft server and map released by Reporters Without Borders (RSF) and created by BlockWorks, DDB Berlin, and Monks to circumvent censorship in countries without freedom of the press. The library contains banned reporting from the United States, Mexico, Russia, Vietnam, Saudi Arabia, Egypt, Brazil, Belarus, Iran, and Eritrea. An entire wing is given to each country, each containing several banned articles placed in virtual books. The library was released on 12 March 2020, the World Day Against Cyber Censorship. The two ways to access the library are to download a map from the official website, or to connect to their Minecraft server.

== Design ==
The library is a large scale project built using a neoclassical architectural style. It is intended to resemble well-established institutions such as the New York Public Library and the Thomas Jefferson Building which houses the Library of Congress, as well as stylistically allude to the authoritarian structures the project aims to subvert. The library uses over 12.5 million Minecraft blocks, with one Minecraft block being equal to one real-life cubic meter in-game.

== Format ==
An example of a readable book (Note: "Multi-party Democracy – The key to strengthen the national economy", written by Nguyễn Văn Đái)

Each of the ten countries covered by the library, as well as Reporters without Borders, has an individual wing, containing a number of articles, available in English and the original language the article was written in. The texts within the library are contained in in-game book items, which can be opened and placed on stands to be read by multiple players at once. These articles generally discuss censorship, unjust punishment, and other critiques of the writer's government. The interior architecture of each country's room symbolizes each country's unique situation and journalistic challenges. Additionally, the library contains a central room listing the Press Freedom Index and state of freedom of the press of every country covered by the index, and the Mexican section contains memorials for reporters who were killed due to their writings. In March 2020, the library contained over 200 different books. In 2026, a wing of the library dedicated to press censorship in the United States was added.

A room in the library covers the impact of the COVID-19 pandemic on journalism, containing books on 10 countries (Brazil, China, Egypt, Hungary, Iran, Myanmar, North Korea, Russia, Thailand, and Turkmenistan) to show how reporting of the virus in each country had been affected.

== Reception ==
After launch, the project went viral across social media platforms and has been featured in various media outlets such as Agence France-Presse, the BBC, DW News, CNBC, CNN, TechCrunch, The Verge, Gizmodo, Engadget, Mashable, PC Gamer and Scene World Magazine. The project also received a 2022 Peabody Award for the Interactive category.

When awarding The Uncensored Library with their Peabody Award, Peabody's website described the library as "a monument to press freedom and an innovative back door for access to censored content."
