= Caramel Pictures =

Dutch film production company

- Formerly: Will van der Vlugt Film Productions
- Type: Private company
- Industry: Film industry
- Founded: 1977; 49 years ago
- Founder: Will van der Vlugt
- Defunct: 2019
- Fate: Acquired
- Successor: .monks
- Headquarters: Amsterdam, Netherlands
- Number of locations: Amsterdam, London, and Miami
- Area served: Worldwide
- Products: Television commercials, short films, promotional food films
- Owner: S4 Capital plc
- Parent: .monks
- Website: www.caramelpictures.com

Caramel Pictures was a Dutch production company that made promotional films and television commercials. It had a particular speciality in films featuring food and liquid products. It had offices in Amsterdam, London, and Miami.

The company was formerly known as Will van der Vlugt Film Productions and was renamed to Caramel Pictures in 2007. It was acquired by MediaMonks in 2019

== History ==
In 1977, Dutch stills photographer Will van der Vlugt moves to film production and founded Will van der Vlugt Film Productions after a career as an advertising photographer. The agency grows out to produce for the international market, working with ad agencies all over the world and creating output for many companies and brands in different countries.

In 2007 the company was renamed to Caramel Pictures.

The company has grown since its start, with offices set up in Amsterdam, London, Miami, Dubai, and Mumbai. The Amsterdam and London offices catered the European market, whereas Miami targeted North and South America. Dubai went on to produce for its own domestic market, but discontinued its shop in 2010. In 2012, Caramel Pictures opened another hub in Mumbai to cater to the Indian market.

In 2009, Caramel Pictures went on to form XS by Caramel Pictures. Via this brand, the company produces commercial work on a minimum budget, and promote the use of various platforms of advertising, such as narrowcasting, internet, video walls, and other new media.

By 2012, the company had five offices, houses nine directors and has one of the biggest film studios of the Netherlands set up in Amsterdam.

In 2019 the company was acquired by MediaMonks, which would later be renamed as Monks, and which was owned by UK private equity firm S4 Capital.

== Commercials ==
Behind the scenes: Robot camera to produce commercials

Throughout the years, Caramel Pictures has produced hundreds of commercials for different countries, brands, and products. Moreover, Caramel Pictures has been involved in different charitable ventures as well as moved into the production of films. Among the commercials Caramel Pictures has created are the award-winning Centraal Beheer campaigns, produced for a Dutch insurance company. Other brands produced for include Hyundai, Ford, Nescafé, Lindt, Amnesty International, McDonald's, and many others.

== Films ==
Trailer Broken Moon

In 2010, Caramel Pictures partnered with the NPS, Parasar, and Sophie Animation to produce the award-winning short film Broken Moon (original title: De Maan is Kapot). Directed by Arno Dierickx, it went on to win the Golden Calf for 'best short film' at the Netherlands Film Festival in 2010, as well as gathering notable attention on various international film festivals.

== Directors ==
By 2013, Caramel Pictures represented nine directors. They were: Will van der Vlugt, Ronald Koetzier, Marcel van der Vlugt, Arno Dierickx, Andreas Grassl, Devon Dickson, Stuart MacLeod, Greg Francois, and Kevin Hewitt.

== Recognition ==
- Golden Lion for Centraal Beheer – The Box at the Cannes Lions International Advertising Festival.
- Silver Lion for Centraal Beheer – Rebel at the Cannes Lions International Advertising Festival.
- Silver Lion for Centraal Beheer – Hedgehog at the Cannes Lions International Advertising Festival.
- Grand Prix for the Centraal Beheer campaign at the New York Film Festival.
