= Marcel Bich =

Co-founder of Bic (1914–1994)

Marcel Bich Baron Bich
- Born: Marcello Luigi Michele Antonio Bich; 29 July 1914; Turin, Italy
- Died: 30 May 1994 (aged 79); Paris, France
- Education: University of Paris
- Children: 11
- Engineering career
- Institutions: Société Bic
- Projects: Ballpoint pens; lighters; razors

Marcel Bich, Baron Bich (French: [bik]; 29 July 1914 – 30 May 1994) was an Italian-French manufacturer and co-founder of Bic, the world's leading producer of ballpoint pens, lighters and razors.

== Early years ==
He was born in Turin, Italy, on 29 July 1914 to Aimé-Mario Bich (1882–1955) and Marie Muffat de Saint-Amour de Chanaz (1886–1967). The Bich family originated at Châtillon, and earlier in the Valtournenche valley, in the Aosta Valley. King Charles Albert of Sardinia granted Emmanuel Bich, mayor of Aosta, the title of baron in 1841. Emmanuel's grandson Aimé-Mario Bich, the father of Marcel Bich, was an engineer who moved to France after failing to gain commercial success in Italy.

The Bich family moved to Spain and then to France where Marcel was naturalised as a French citizen in 1932 and later studied law at the University of Paris. He served in the French Air Force at the outset of World War II.

== Business success ==
In 1944, Marcel Bich and his partner, Édouard Buffard, bought an empty factory in the Paris suburb of Clichy, where they began the production of inexpensive pen holders and pencil cases.

Bich was originally a skeptic of ballpoint pens, which at the time were unreliable and leaked. In 1946, however, by observing the channel made by the wheel of his wheelbarrow in the ground, he understood the unique selling point of the ballpoint pen. Just as the wheel made transporting items easier, the ball could allow the hand to be free from the constraints of the pen nib and make writing more fluid.

Marcel Bich bought the patent for the ballpoint pen for US$2 million from Hungarian László Bíró who had been producing such pens since 1943 in Argentina. Using Swiss watchmaking tools, he devised a manufacturing process that produced stainless-steel balls for the tip of the pen, and the Bic Cristal ballpoint pen became his first product in 1950. The Bic Cristal ballpoint pen went on to become a worldwide best-seller. He then invented the famous four-color pen in 1969. These designs remains mostly unchanged today. Bich formed Société Bic in 1953.

Bich partnered with poster designer Raymond Savignac to create the company's advertisements, who created the Bic Boy that later became part of the company's official logo. Bic won the first French Oscar for advertising, sponsored the Tour de France, and became an essential item and a household name.

Between 1950 and the 1970s, Bic expanded globally, into Italy, the Netherlands, Austria, Switzerland and Spain, followed by South America and North America.

In 1973, Bic introduced a disposable pocket lighter that could provide 3,000 lights before wearing out. In 1975, the brand released the one-piece polystyrene razor, the first single-piece disposable razor with an integrated blade and a lightweight plastic handle.

The company formed by Bich still exists as the Société Bic Group and is listed on the Paris Stock Exchange and majority-owned by his family.

Bich stepped down as Chairman of Societe Bic in 1993. He was succeeded by his son, Bruno, who served as chairman for 25 years, 15 of which also as CEO. Marcel's grandson Gonzalve Bich has been CEO since 2018.

== Yacht racing and sailing ==
Bich was a keen sailor. He funded four campaigns to compete in the trials to select a challenger for the America's Cup in 1970, 1974, 1977 and 1980, and was inducted, posthumously, into the America's Cup Hall of Fame in 1998.

== Personal life ==
Bich was one of three children; he had a sister Marie Thérèse Louise Antoinette Léandra Bich (1913–1970) and brother Albert Bich (1916–1989).

He was married to Louise Chamussy in 1937. After her death in 1950 he married Jacqueline de Dufourq (1911–2007, divorced) and, in 1956, Laurence Courier de Mère (1932–). He had 11 children.

== Death ==
He died on 30 May 1994 in Paris, aged 79. His first wife, Louise Chamussy, died in 1950. He was survived by his wife, Laurence Courier de Mère, 11 children and several grandchildren and great-grandchildren.

== See also ==
- László Bíró – Hungarian-Argentine inventor (1899–1985)
