= Universal Typeface =

Universal Typeface may refer to:

- The Universal typeface of Herbert Bayer, one of the Bauhaus typefaces.
- The Universal Typeface Experiment, a crowdsourced typeface
