= Pariss =

Electric sports car

Pariss is an electric sports car from Paris, France. Damien Biro, whose grandfather and great-uncle László Bíró invented the modern ballpoint pen in 1938, is the builder of the Pariss Electric Roadster. It has two lithium-ion batteries, one powering the front wheels and one powering the rear and a Carbon-fiber-reinforced polymer body.
