= Universal Typeface Experiment =

Crowdsourced typeface based on handwriting

- Website type: Promotional
- Owner: Bic
- Creators: MediaMonks, Tribal DDB
- Advertising: Bic Cristal
- Launched: 5 June 2014
- Current status: Defunct

The Universal Typeface Experiment was a promotional website funded by Bic, the maker of the Bic pen. The website crowdsourced a typeface with mobile users who entered their handwriting on the website using a touchpad and the then newly updated BIC pen called the Cristal Stylus, which included a touchpad-friendly rubber tip. About 1.7 million characters were submitted to the website, and the resulting typefaces were published in 2014.

== Setup ==
The website was launched on 6 June 2014. On the first day, about 8.000 people entered their handwriting. Though it was possible to participate using one's fingers, writing with a pen was significantly easier. Notwithstanding this difference, the website offered the contributor the opportunity to sign in and answer some demographic questions, enabling automatic aggregation of statistics about handwriting that sparked an article in the Smithsonian magazine. In this averaged handwriting experiment, the user was presented with 26 capital letters of the uppercase Latin alphabet in random order in the Arial font. On the website, users could compare their own writing with the whole repository.

The website, hosted by Tribal DDB and developed by the Dutch ad agency MediaMonks, was originally intended as a product launch and was scheduled to be taken down in August 2014, but the site was still live and accepting contributions until 2016. It won the "Site of the Month" award by the Favourite Website Awards (FWA) in 2014.

In the end, over 1.725 million characters were submitted through the website. In late 2014, the resulting typefaces, average of all contributions, were published, split by country, gender, left- and righthandedness, sector and age. Although the website is not available anymore, the typefaces were uploaded to the Internet Archive.
