= Caramel (disambiguation) =

Caramel is a sweet food.

Caramel may also refer to:

- Caramel color, a food coloring
- Caramel (film), a 2007 film directed by Nadine Labaki
- Caramel (album), by Connan Mockasin, 2013
- "Caramel" (Suzanne Vega song), 1996
- "Caramel" (City High song), 2001
- "Caramel" (Sleep Token song), 2025
- "Caramel", a 1999 song by Blur from the album 13
- "Caramel", a 2012 song by Booba
- "Caramel", a 2016 song by Corinne Bailey Rae from the album The Heart Speaks in Whispers
- "Caramel" a 2022 song by 5 Seconds Of Summer from the album 5SOS5
- Caramel Pictures, a film company producing commercials
- Ferenc Molnár, popularly known as Caramel, Hungarian singer
- Cadbury Caramel, a chocolate bar

== See also ==
- Caramell, a Swedish musical group
- Carmel (disambiguation)
