= CSS Design Awards =

International web design awards program

- Awarded for: Web design and development
- Sponsored by: Mobbin, Red Collar
- Country: USA
- Status: Active
- First award: 2010
- Website: www.cssdesignawards.com

CSS Design Awards (CSSDA) is an international web design awards program and online gallery of websites.

== History ==
CSSDA was founded in 2009 and began giving awards in 2010 for website design and development.

In October 2013, CSSDA organizers launched a redesigned website and a revised scoring system. The revised system evaluated creativity and design of a website, coding, overall usability, and content. CSSDA also introduced digital award certificates and preliminary evaluations for nominated websites.

CSSDA accepts website submissions at any time. Its international jury, which consists of creative directors, designers and the founders of digital and communication agencies, evaluates individual websites and their creators.

== Awards and judging ==
CSSDA runs two judging systems for its main site awards and public vote awards. Website of the Day awards are determined by a panel, while public vote awards are determined through a combination of audience and panel assessments.

The main website distinctions include Website of the Day, Website of the Month, and Website of the Year. Website of the Month recipients are selected from Website of the Day winners, while Website of the Year recipients are selected from Website of the Month and select Website of the Day winners.

CSSDA public awards recognize user interface design, user experience design, and user innovation. A combination of judges’ scores and public audience votes are used to determine whether a site will receive any of these distinctions. The program also gives Special Kudos to sites which have exceeded a certain judging threshold for a Website of the Day award.

The annual Designer of the Year award recognizes designer achievement in each of three segments: individual designers, design studios of 2-10 people, and design agencies of 10 or more people.

== Interactive documentaries and online gallery ==
CSSDA recognition also extends to interactive documentaries. In 2015, Pontifical Catholic University of Rio Grande do Sul's Fernanda Bernardes published her thesis on web documentaries. The thesis highlighted CSSDA among international web content awards with categories applicable to interactive web media. Two years later, the Spanish public broadcaster RTVE won the Website of the Day award for its interactive documentary Guerra a la mentira. In 2022, the Zeki Müren Hotline web documentary received the platform's Special Kudos award for Website of the Day.

CSSDA also maintains an online gallery of nominated and awarded websites. The gallery permits users to search by industry, color, and design feature. In 2024, Nippon Television highlighted the online gallery for its animation, typography, and grid layout search options.

== Industry reception ==
Industry publications compare CSSDA with other online design award programs, including the Awwwards and The FWA. In 2019, Japanese web-production company MONSTER DIVE, assessed the three award programs, and noted CSSDA for its unique scoring system, public voting model, and annual distinctions for design teams of all sizes.

In 2023, Prismic described CSSDA as having fewer followers and less reach than Awwwards, but favored the platform's interface design, user experience and overall functionality. The same year, IONOS Digital Guide noted CSSDA’s search and web design resources as positive aspects of the site. While it praised the platform for evaluating based on originality, the publication criticized CSSDA for showing only a small sample of entries with a limited spectrum of design trends.

In 2026, Colorlib distinguished CSSDA from Awwwards based on the platform's recognition of smaller design studios, experimental personal projects, and non-English websites.

== See also ==
- Awwwards
- TheFWA
- Cool Site of the Day
- Webby Awards
