= Mine Kafon Drone =

Drone for demining

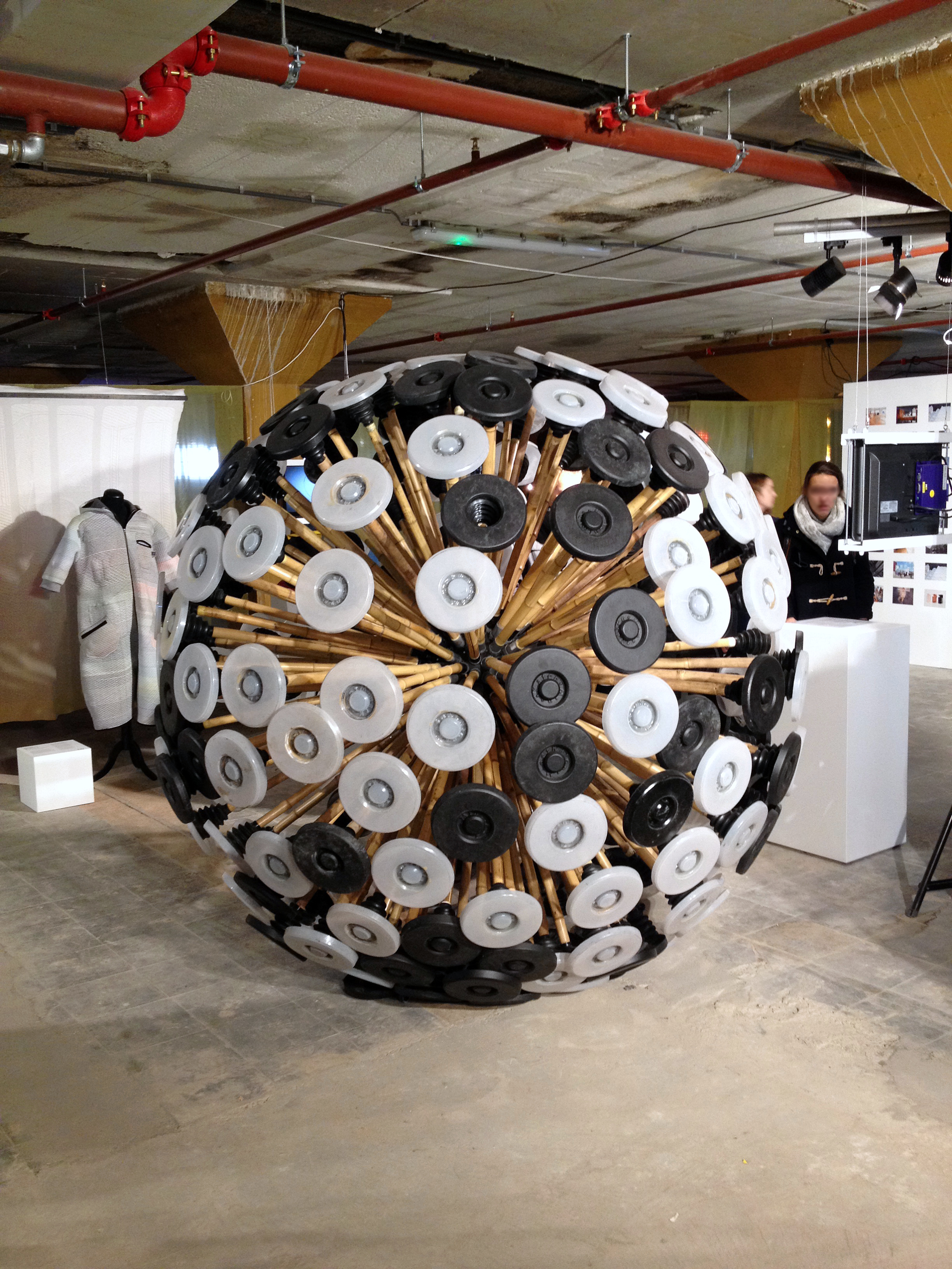
Mine Kafon Ball by designer Massoud Hassani, during Dutch Design Week 2015 in Eindhoven

The Mine Kafon Drone is a drone for demining, led by Afghanistan-born Massoud Hassani. The drone is designed to map an area for land mines, detect the mines, and then detonate them remotely. It has been field-tested with the Dutch Ministry of Defence. The use of a drone is safer and less expensive than typical methods for mine removal, which endanger trained mine disposal experts and dogs. The Mine Kafon Foundation, established by Hassani in 2013, is based in Eindhoven, Netherlands.

In 2025, the Mine Kafon was included in Pirouette: Turning Points in Design, an exhibition at the Museum of Modern Art featuring "widely recognized design icons [...] highlighting pivotal moments in design history."

== Background ==
=== Massoud Hassani ===
Massoud Hassani was born in Afghanistan, where there are an estimated 10 million mines buried in about 500 square kilometres (190 sq mi). He and his brother, Mahmud, in fear of the landmines, took a special path to school. Massoud says, that knowing that there are buried landmines "becomes like a mental disorder... The fear is on your mind all the time." As children, the boys made wind-driven toys to play with around the Kabul deserts, but they would get stuck in the middle of minefields.

His mother arranged for smugglers to get him out of the country when he was 14 years of age. The Hassani family settled in the Netherlands. Massoud studied Industrial Design at Design Academy Eindhoven, and inspired by homemade wind-powered toys he made during his childhood, he and his brother created the Mine Kafon wind-powered landmine machine—Kafon means "explode" in Dari. The machine, which looks like a giant dandelion puff ball that rolls across areas of land and detonates landmines, was created for his 2011 graduation project. Made of bamboo, iron, and plastic, the design that was inspired by a starburst was a finalist in London's Design Museum's 2012 Design of the Year Award. Called a visual poem by the New York Times, it was exhibited in 2013 at the Museum of Modern Art in New York City and the following year at "The Fab Mind: Hints of the Future in a Shifting World" design exhibition as one of the "socially and politically engaged designs".

The concept for demining using the dandelion-shaped machine works in theory, particularly in open desert areas where the wind blows freely, but it could cause more problems—in terms of retrieval and maintenance—once it was damaged in the middle of a minefield, says Henk van der Slik of the Dutch Explosive Ordnance Disposal organization. While it is not an effective tool for demining, it could be used to identify potential areas where mines were placed.

=== Landmines worldwide ===
There are about 100 million buried landmines in 60 countries. The United Nations states that there are 20,000 individuals—mostly the elderly, women, and children— that are maimed by landmines annually. According to Ingenieur, civilians make up the largest portion of victims of landmines, at an estimate of 79% of the total victims. The military are estimated to be 18% of the victims, and professional mine sweepers are 3% of the victims.

Typically, mines are removed using mine disposal experts, dogs, and wheeled vehicles, which is dangerous. Further, the mines become more unstable over time. It costs between $300–1,000 to remove each mine, according to the World Economic Forum. It is also a lengthy process. There were 171,000 American and Soviet mines laid in Mozambique during their revolution, which have been said to have killed up to 15,000 people, according to Human Rights Watch. It took 22 years to clear the mines from the country. The effort was completed in 2015.

=== The project ===
Subsequently, the project rapidly gained media-interest. In 2012, Massoud and his brother Mahmud organised a Kickstarter campaign to raise funds for the development of the Mine Kafon tumbleweed mine detonator ball. The project raised funds on the crowdfunding site Kickstarter with their goal set at £100,000 and receiving £119,456. After the successful fundraising campaign, Massoud established the Mine Kafon Foundation, a research and development organization, in 2013 in Eindhoven, Netherlands.

Prototyping and field testing of the drone was conducted with the support of the Dutch Ministry of Defence. They also crowd-sourced globally for designers and engineers to collaborate on the project. The team, led by Massoud, currently optimises the Mine Kafon to safely and efficiently operate across all landmine contaminated terrains.

== The drone ==
At the moment we are preparing a pilot in a 150 square km field. That’s about the size of 37,000 football stadiums. First we do the 3D mapping part with only 10 drones working 24/7 for a period of two months. Then we apply the detection drones. We will need about 50 Mine Kafon Drones with metal detectors to detect the fields cm by cm for six months. These drones will fly 24/7 over this whole period of time. The landscape is like a mine-filled desert but in less than a year this landscape can be a green zone.

—Massoud Hassani, August 2016

The unmanned airborne de-mining system uses a three step process to autonomously map, detect and detonate land mines. It flies above potentially dangerous areas, generating a 3D map using its 3D camera, GPS, and a computer. It then uses a metal detector that hovers close above the ground using sensors and a retractable arm keep to pinpoint and geotag the location of mines. The drone can then place a detonator above the mines using its robotic gripping arm, before retreating to a safe distance and detonating the mine. The firm claims its drone is safer, 20 times faster and up to 200 times cheaper than current technologies and might clear mines globally in 10 years. Some of the challenges are that it is difficult to rely on GPS for precise locations and it is difficult to identify mines that have been buried for decades.

In terms of the mechanics, the goal now is to optimize the drone and create base stations. The team will explore using external antennas to triangulate locations, to improve the results of using GPS alone. In addition, the plan is to train pilots to use the drone and carry out tests in different countries. Another Kickstarter campaign was established in July 2016 to help fund these efforts with the goal set at €70,000 and receiving over €100,000 above it (€177,456).
