= Bic lighter =

Disposable lighter produced since 1973

BiC lighter
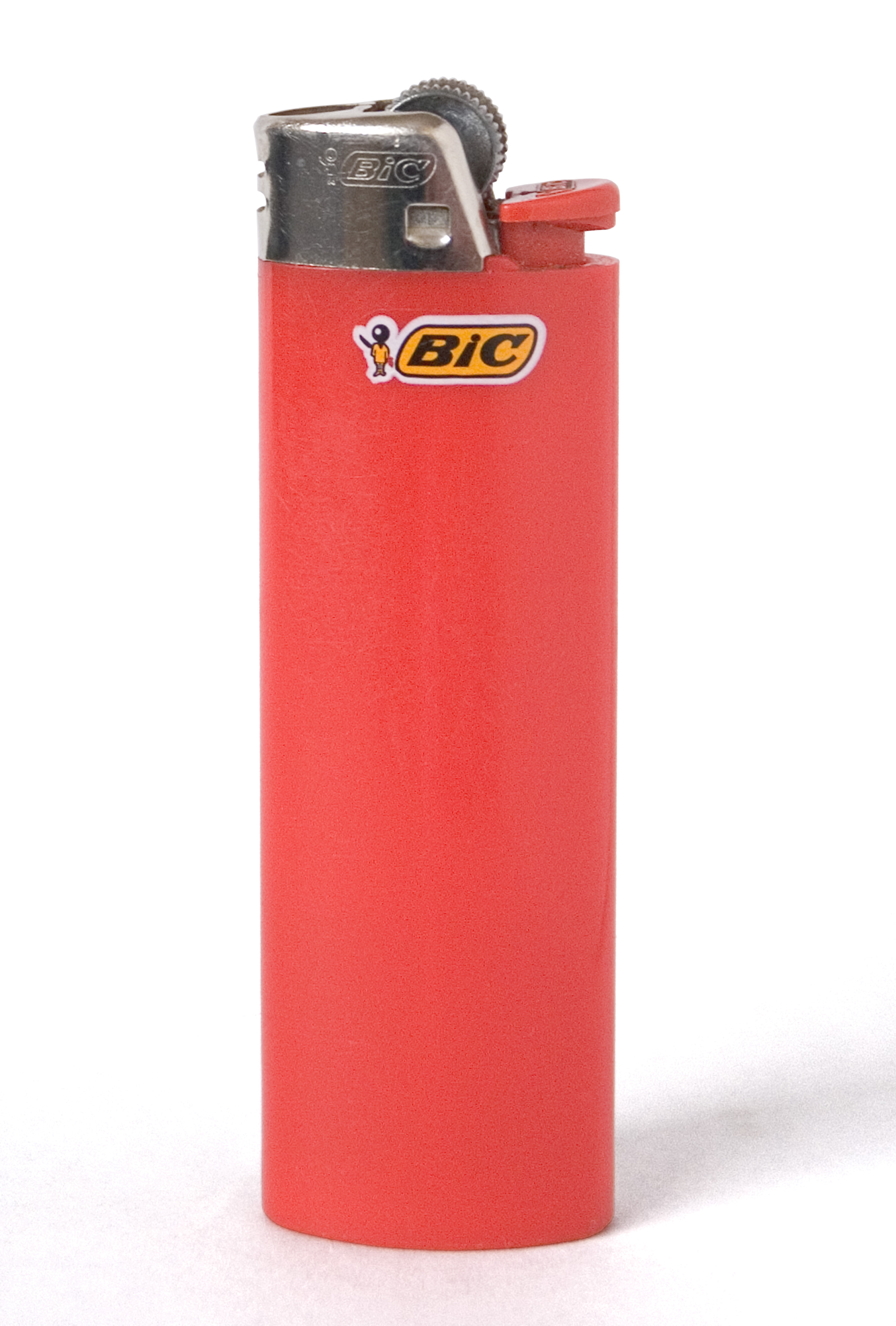
- Type: Disposable lighter
- Inception: 1973
- Manufacturer: Société Bic S.A.
- Website: BIC lighter official homepage

A BiC lighter is a disposable lighter manufactured by Société Bic S.A. since 1973. According to the company, "BIC is the world's largest manufacturer of branded pocket lighters" and has "sold over 30 billion lighters" (as of February 2024). The fuel used in the lighters is usually liquid butane.

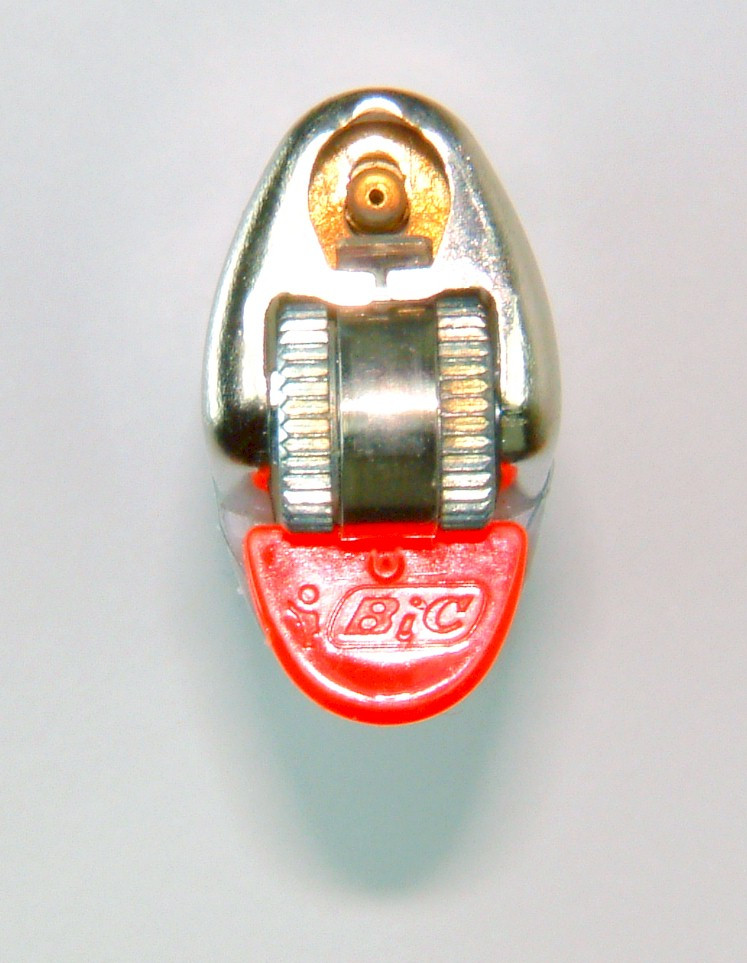
BiC lighter (top view)

== Marketing ==
The BIC lighter was first mentioned in a 1972 Time magazine article reporting that BIC was developing a lighter that could be lit up to 3,000 times before wearing out. In 1970s television commercials, the company told potential consumers to "flick your BIC", a slogan that is still used.

In 2022, BIC began to advertise its EZ Reach lighters with designs by Snoop Dogg, Martha Stewart, and Willie Nelson. These advertisements use humor hinting at the use of cannabis, as all three celebrities are known for their cannabis use.
