= Bernard Villemot =

French graphic artist (1911–1989)

Bernard Villemot (1911, Trouville-sur-Mer – 1989) was a French graphic artist, known primarily for his advertising images for Orangina, Bally Shoe, Perrier, and Air France.

He was known for a sharp artistic vision that was influenced by photography, and for his ability to distill an advertising message to a memorable image with simple, elegant lines and bold colors.

== Early life and education ==
From 1932 to 1934, Villemot studied in Paris with artist Paul Colin, who was considered a master of Art Deco.

== Career ==
From 1945 to 1946, Villemot prepared posters for the Red Cross. In the late 1940s, he also began a famous series of travel posters for Air France that would continue for decades. In 1949, Villemot's works were exhibited with those of his contemporary poster artist Raymond Savignac at the gallery of the Beaux-Arts de Paris.

In 1953, Villemot began designing logos and posters for the new soft drink Orangina, and over time these works would become some of his best known. In 1963, the Musée des Arts Décoratifs, Paris held an exhibition of his works. By the end of his life, he was known as one of the last great poster artists, and many collectors and critics consider him to be the "painter-laureate of modern commercial art."

Since Villemot's death, his memorable images have been increasingly sought after by collectors. At least three books have been published that survey his art: Les affiches de Villemot by Jean-Francois Bazin (1985); Villemot: l'affiche de A à Z by Guillaume Villemot (2005); and Embracing an Icon: The Posters of Bernard Villemot by George H. Bon Salle (2015).
