= Bic =

French manufacturing company

Société Bic S.A.
- Type: Société anonyme
- Traded as: Euronext Paris: BB; CAC Mid 60 Component
- Industry: Manufacturing
- Founded: 25 October 1945; 80 years ago
- Founders: Marcel Bich; Édouard Buffard
- Headquarters: Clichy, France
- Area served: Worldwide
- Key people: Gonzalve Bich (CEO)
- Products: Lighters; Razors; Pens; Sports Equipment
- Brands: BIC; Conté
- Revenue: ▼€2.090 billion (2025)
- Operating income: ▲€303.5 million (2022)
- Net income: ▼€208.9 million (2022)
- Total assets: ▲€2.6835 billion (2022)
- Total equity: ▲€1.8763 billion (2022)
- Owner: Bich family
- Number of employees: 15,898 (2022)
- Website: bic.com

Société Bic S.A., commonly referred to as Bic (stylized as BiC or BIC), is a French manufacturing corporation based in Clichy, Hauts-de-Seine. Founded in 1945 by Italian aristocrat Marcel Bich and Édouard Buffard, the company produces disposable items, specifically pens, stationery, lighters, and shaving razors.

== History ==
In 1945, Marcel Bich, former director of an ink factory, and his partner, Édouard Buffard, established a business creating writing instrument parts in a factory in the Paris suburb of Clichy, where they began production of pen holders and pencil cases. Bich bought the patent for the ballpoint pen from Hungarian-Argentine inventor László Bíró and, using Swiss watchmaking tools, devised a manufacturing process that produced stainless-steel balls for the tip of the pen. Bich soon perfected the design of the ballpoint pen, and the Bic Cristal ballpoint pen became the company's first product (under the "BIC" name) in 1950. As of 2005, the Bic Cristal had sold over one hundred billion units since its launch.

In order to avoid problems with sales in English-speaking countries (although in French, his name is not pronounced bitch but "beesh"), Bich dropped the letter H when he formed Société Bic in 1953, and the company was listed on the Paris Stock Exchange in 1972. The design of the pen has remained mostly unchanged since its initial launch, and as of 2021, remains the best-selling pen in the world.

Between 1950 and the 1970s, BIC expanded globally into Italy, the Netherlands, Austria, Switzerland, and Spain. In 1956, the company established itself in Brazil, and soon after expanded into the United Kingdom, Australia, New Zealand, and Scandinavia in 1957. In 1958, the takeover of the American Waterman Pen Company allowed BIC to establish itself in the United States. The company also continued its development in Africa and the Middle East. In 1959, BIC acquired the Swedish company Ballograf.

On November 20, 1962, BIC launched a range of three luxury ballpoint pens: Chrome, Luxury, and Grand Luxury. In 1969, Bic launched its advertising campaign in the United States. A year later, the four-color Bic was launched. The four-color pen allowed one to change the ink color without changing the pen. Bic's ability to mass produce the manufacturing of their pens resulted in low prices.

In 1971, Bich took control of the French Flaminaire company, a manufacturer of butane lighters, and set its technicians to the task of developing a disposable lighter. The first model of the Bic lighter was introduced in 1973.

The Conté company was acquired by BIC in 1979.

In 1981, BIC launched "BIC Sport", which specializes in windsurfing boards. Bic announced the sale of Bic Sport to the Estonian company Tahe Outdoor in 2019.

In 1985, the "BIC Mini lighter" was launched and, in 1991, the company launched the "BIC Electronic" lighter. The group began its expansion into Eastern Europe in 1995, and, in 1996, BIC Graphic Europe was formed.

=== 1990s–present ===
In 1992, Bic purchased Wite-Out Products, an American brand of correction products, and subsequently reintroduced the correction fluid as Bic Wite Out. In 1997, BIC acquired the German Tipp-Ex correction fluid brand as well as Sheaffer. The company further expanded into Asia.

In 2000, the Marne-la-Vallée factory opened. Two years later, the company launched BIC Sport kayaks, and the BIC Comfort 3 & BIC Soleil razors were both released soon after. In 2004, BIC acquired Stypen SA and Kosaido Shoji.

In the summer of 2008, Bic launched the Bic Phone, marketed primarily in France and Belgium. It was advertised as a ready-to-use phone with one hour of communication and integrated SIM card and charged battery. The SIM card came loaded with 10 minutes of prepaid calls.

In December 2015, BIC acquired 100 percent ownership in Cello Writing, India, and the company was renamed as "BIC Cello (India)". Cello was founded in 1995 and, as of December 2015, is India's largest manufacturer and distributor of writing instruments. In 2019 BIC inaugurated a new facility located in Nairobi, Kenya, which serves the East Africa region. As of May 2021, BIC has over 25 factories around the world. BIC's global headquarters remains in Clichy, outside of Paris, France. Its U.S. headquarters are in Shelton, Connecticut.

In 2018, BIC introduced a new line of temporary tattoo markers called BodyMark by BIC. Soon after, in 2019, Bic launched the Made For You grooming line, a line of shaving products without gender labels.

In 2020, BIC purchased Djeep, a manufacturer of high-end and personalized lighters. The acquisition allowed Bic to expand its customizable lighter range. That same year, Bic acquired Rocketbook, a smart reusable notebook brand in the U.S., in order to bring together analogue and digital writing.

Among the eco-friendly products introduced in 2021 as part of the BIC ReVolution product line includes three ballpoint pen products, including one made of 73% recycled ocean plastic, mechanical pencils made of 65% recycled plastic, permanent markers made of 51% recycled plastic, as well as correction tape made of 56% recycled plastic.

In May 2021, BIC launched an ad campaign featuring Martha Stewart and Snoop Dogg to promote their new EZ Reach lighter.

In January 2022, BIC acquired Inkbox, a Canadian semi-permanent tattoo brand, for $US65 million. Soon after, in August 2022, BIC also acquired Tattly, a company that produces high-quality temporary tattoos designed by artists. In 2023, BIC launched EasyRinse, a razor with the first-of-its-kind reverse blade design and patented anti-clog technology.

== Products ==
=== Lighters ===
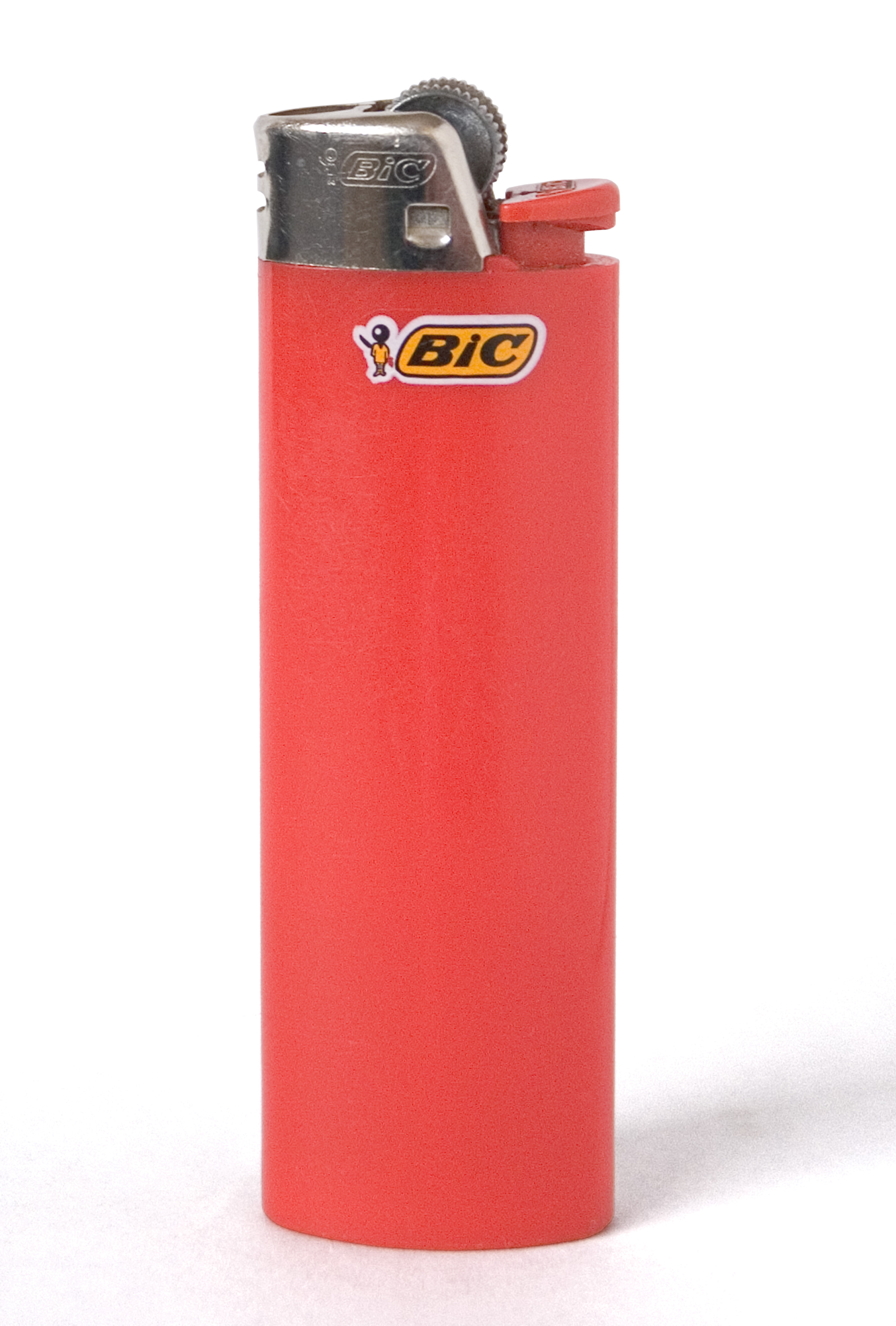
A Bic lighter

Bic's earliest lighters were mentioned in 1972 by Time as test marketed disposable lighters with a lifespan of 3,000 lights. The following year, Bic's lighters were commercially introduced, competing with Gillette's Cricket lighters. These lighters, made using plastic, initially had only five colours, but they were competitively sold at a low price, which ultimately led to Gillette leaving the lighter market. At the time, Bic lighters accounted for around 65% of disposable lighter sales, and they still continue to be cheap and popular as of 2026. Bic operates a factory specifically for manufacturing lighters in Redon, with 400 employees who produce 750 million lighters yearly.

=== Razors ===
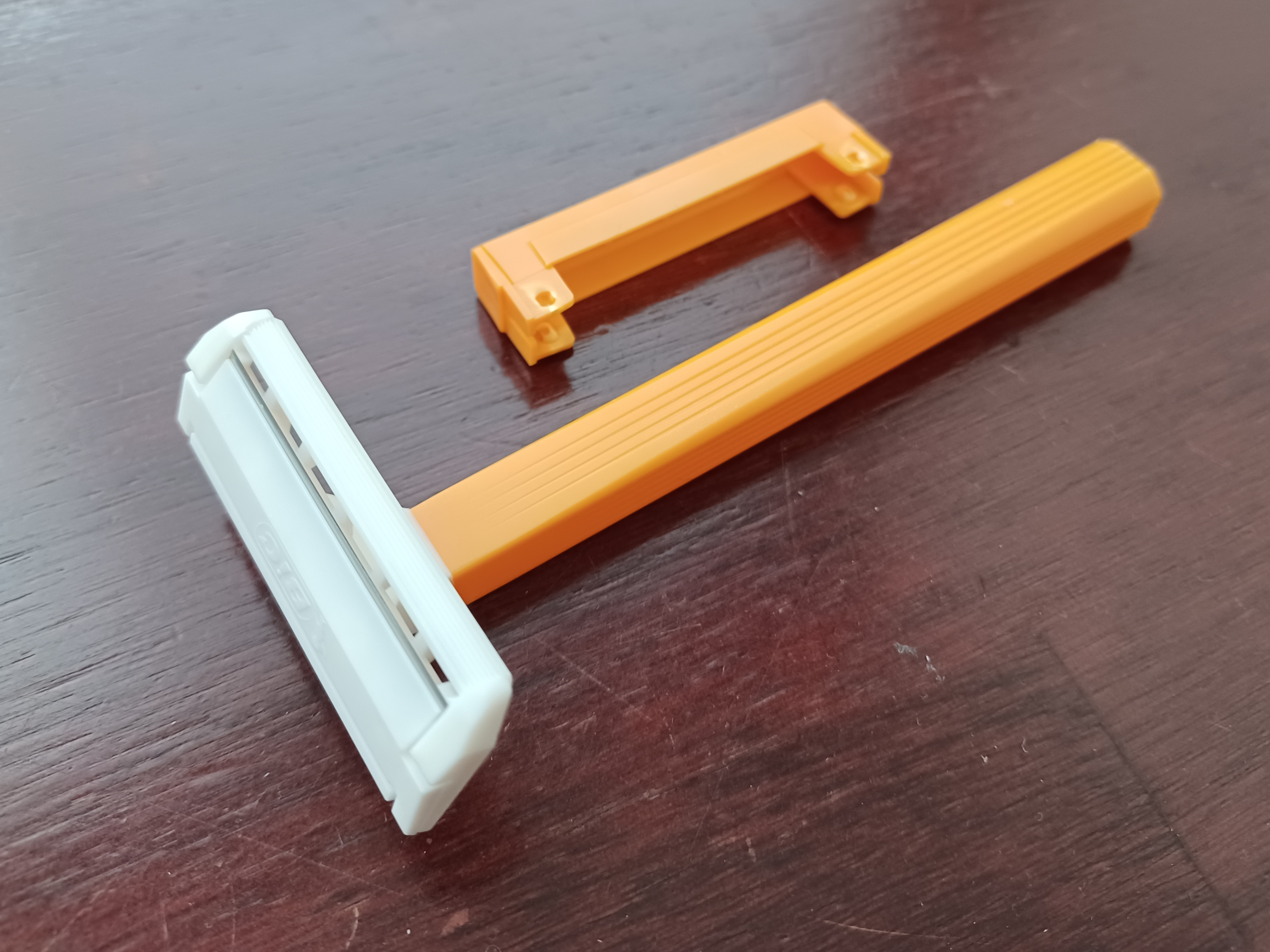
A single-blade Bic razor

During the 1980s, Bic shaving products reached US$52 million in sales and had 22.4% of the market.

In 1989, Bic attempted further product diversification with the introduction of pocket-sized perfume spritzers. The perfumes were withdrawn in 1991.

Bic's shaving portfolio expanded throughout the 1990s and 2000s, adding the Soleil, a brand of razors for women, in 2004, and increasing the number of blades until the Flex 5 launched, with five blades, in January 2015 in the United States.

=== Pens ===
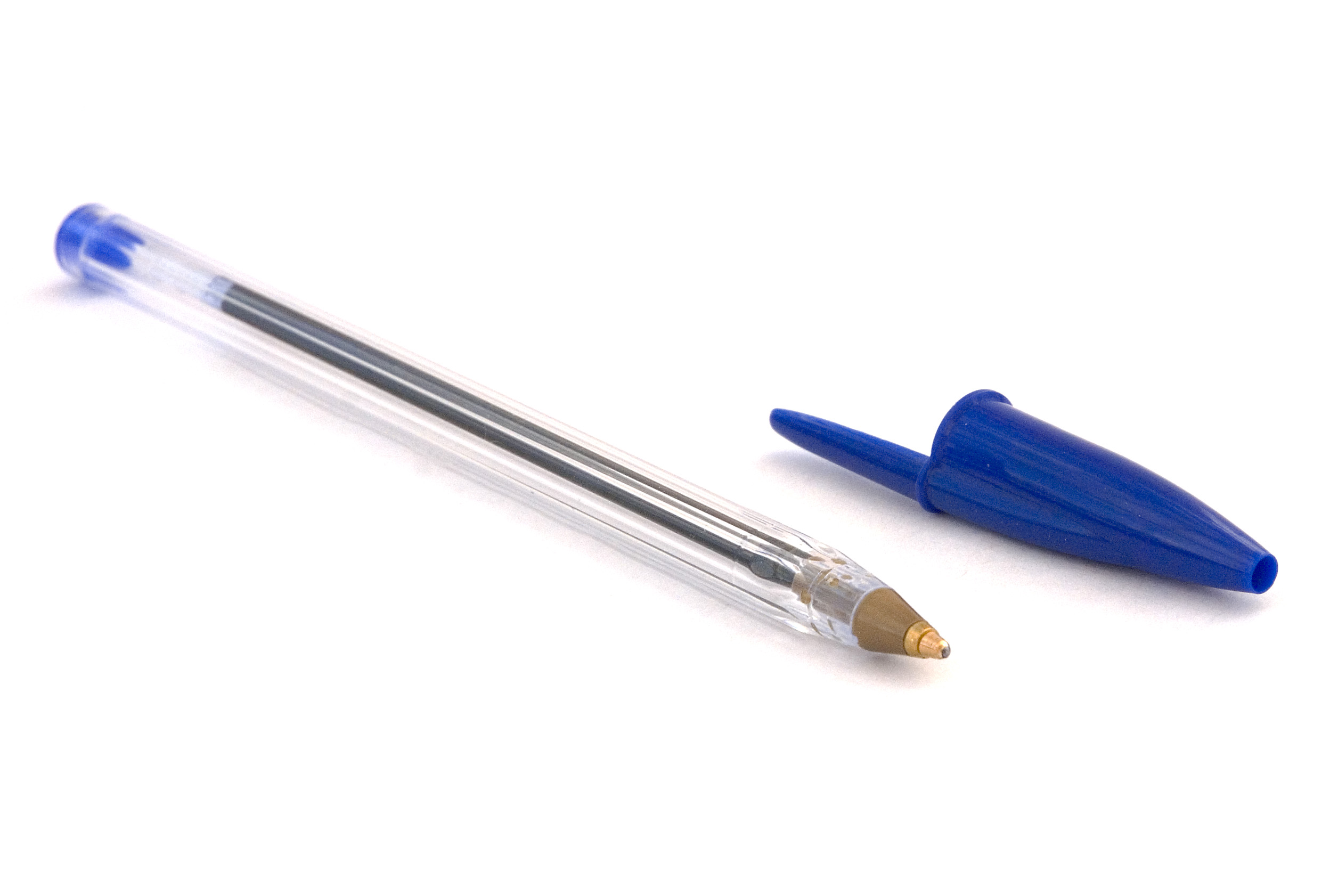
Bic Cristal pen

After purchasing the rights to a patent from László Bíró, the original developer of ballpoint pens, Bic launched its first product, the Bic Cristal pen, in 1950. Bic has made many attempts to build on its old success and make better ballpoints, but the Cristal remains the most successful.

== Environmental efforts ==
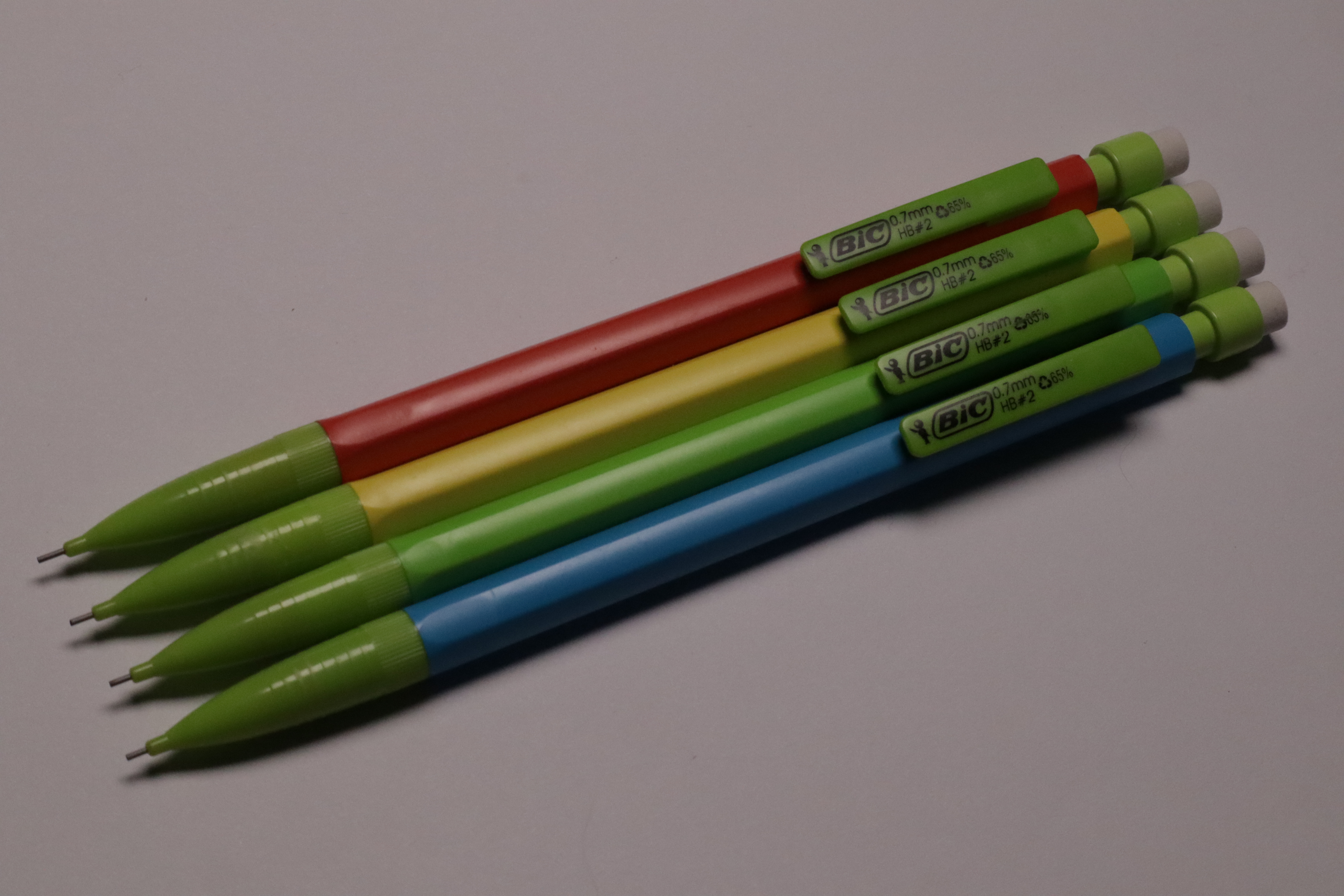
BIC Ecolutions HB Mechanical Pencils

In 2021, Bic introduced an eco-friendly stationery product line called Bic ReVolution. Products sold under this line, including ball and stick pens, mechanical pencils, permanent markers and correction tape, were made using at least 50% recycled plastic, as well as the paperboard used in all of the packaging being made of 100% recycled material. In 2022, Bic joined One Percent for the Planet, an environmental organization in which its members contribute at least one percent of their annual revenue to protect the environment. As a part of joining, one percent of annual sales from BIC ReVolution goes towards supporting environmental nonprofits.

By 2025, Bic plans on having 100% of its packaging use reusable, recyclable or compostable material. Additionally, Bic's products will contain 50% non-virgin plastic by 2030.

== Ownership ==
The Bich family owns about 46% of issued shares and controls 63% of its voting power.

== Sponsorship ==
Bic sponsored a professional cycling team in the 1960s, led by Tour de France winners Jacques Anquetil and Luis Ocaña. The company began sponsoring the Tour again in 2011 as an "official supporter", which they have continued to do to the present day.

Bic also sponsored the Alain Prost–led Prost Grand Prix team in Formula One from 1997 to 2000.

== Corporate identity ==
=== Logo ===
The corporate logo comprises two parts: a rhomboid with curved corners, left and right sides angled upward and containing the letters "BiC" with "i" the only one in lower case, and the Bic Boy to its left. The rhomboid, which debuted in 1950 to coincide with the launch of the Bic Cristal, was originally red with white letters. The font of the letters remains unchanged. The Bic Boy is described on the corporation's website as "a schoolboy, with a head in the shape of a ball, holding a pen behind his back." The ball is the tungsten carbide one that was the key feature in Bic's new ballpoint pens in 1960. The schoolboy was designed by Raymond Savignac who also developed the product's "Nouvelle Bille" (new ballpoint) advertising campaign, which was intended to attract the attention of children. When the Bic Boy was added to the left of the rhomboid one year later in 1961, both changed to the newly adopted official corporate colour of orange (Pantone 1235C).

== In popular culture ==
In 2018, Centquatre-Paris featured a Bic exhibition, which included 150 works created with the Bic collection. The exhibition included works by Alberto Giacometti, René Magritte and Fernand Léger, Martin Parr and Mamadou Cissé.

The Bic Cristal is exhibited at the Museum of Modern Art in New York and the Center Pompidou in Paris.

In 2020, the Bic Corporate Foundation was recognized in the Netflix Documentary On Est Ensemble. The film follows French social entrepreneur Stephane de Freitas on his journey to meet social change worldwide, introducing viewers to the organization's work in Brazil to educate and empower women.

In July 2021, Bic partnered with iconic French 19th-century department store La Samaritaine to create a limited-edition collection of products inspired by the façade for which it is famous.

Additionally, in August 2021, to celebrate more than 70 years of the Cristal Ballpoint Pen, Bic has collaborated with luxury French malletier, Pinel et Pinel, on the launch of a special-edition version of its iconic pen.

In 2023, BIC launched a special edition 4-Color Marvel Studios' The Marvels Edition Retractable Ballpoint Pen.

== Filmography ==
- Le Bic Cristal, a documentary for television directed by Danielle Schirman and first aired on Arte in October 2005.

== Maintaining activities in Russia during the war in Ukraine ==
BIC has drawn criticism for maintaining its business operations in Russia after the Russian invasion of Ukraine in February 2022. Yale University's Chief Executive Leadership Institute has published lists identifying companies, including BIC, that have continued operations in Russia despite the ongoing conflict.
