= Pirouette: Turning Points in Design =

2025 exhibition at the Museum of Modern Art

- Warming stripes data graphic (Note: The minimalist style of warming stripes data graphics was conceived by climate scientist Ed Hawkins to intuitively convey global warming trends to non-scientists without unnecessary technical distractions. The version displayed here shows annual surface temperature variation for the period from 1850 to 2024 (as of January 2025). Periodically updated versions of this image and related graphics are available from the source under CC BY-4.0 licence.) by Ed Hawkins (2025)
- Date: January 26 – November 16, 2025
- Venue: Museum of Modern Art
- Location: The Philip Johnson Galleries; MoMA, Floor 3, 3 North; New York City
- Theme: Pivotal moments in design history
- Organised by: Paola Antonelli
- Website: moma.org/calendar/exhibitions/5756

Pirouette: Turning Points in Design was an exhibition at the Museum of Modern Art in New York that ran from January to November 2025. According to the museum, "the objects in Pirouette highlight the role of designers at their most inventive ... and demonstrate the power of design to translate human experience into tangible forms and envision a better future." The exhibition featured "widely recognized design icons and those known to more niche audiences, highlighting pivotal moments in design history."

== Overview ==
Pirouette: Turning Points in Design opened January 26, 2025 at the Museum of Modern Art (MoMA) in New York. Originally scheduled to run until mid-October, it was extended by a month, closing on the 16th of November, 2025. The exhibition was curated by Paola Antonelli with assistance from Maya Ellerkmann, and included many familiar and iconic designs such as BiC Cristal pens, Post-it notes, M&Ms candy, and Susan Kare's early-1980s hand-drawn artwork for the original Mac OS icons.

Sad Mac and Happy Mac icons by Susan Kare (1980s)

In addition to these widely recognised cultural artefacts, the show also examined the impact of less well-known designs such as Massoud Hassani's wind-powered deminer, the Doctors Without Borders middle upper arm circumference measuring device (a.k.a. MUAC "Bracelet of Life"), Sabine Marcelis's Candy Cube, bubble-gum pink cube-shaped furniture made from polished, translucent cast resin, as well as the first 176 emojis devised by Shigetaka Kurita for NTT DoCoMo in the late 1990s.

More familiar works of 2D graphic design included the 1975 NASA worm logo by Bruce Blackburn and Richard Danne, warming stripes data graphics by climate scientist Ed Hawkins, and the ubiquitous I ❤ NY logo – displayed together with Milton Glaser's original 1976 "back of a taxi" concept sketch for the iconic design.

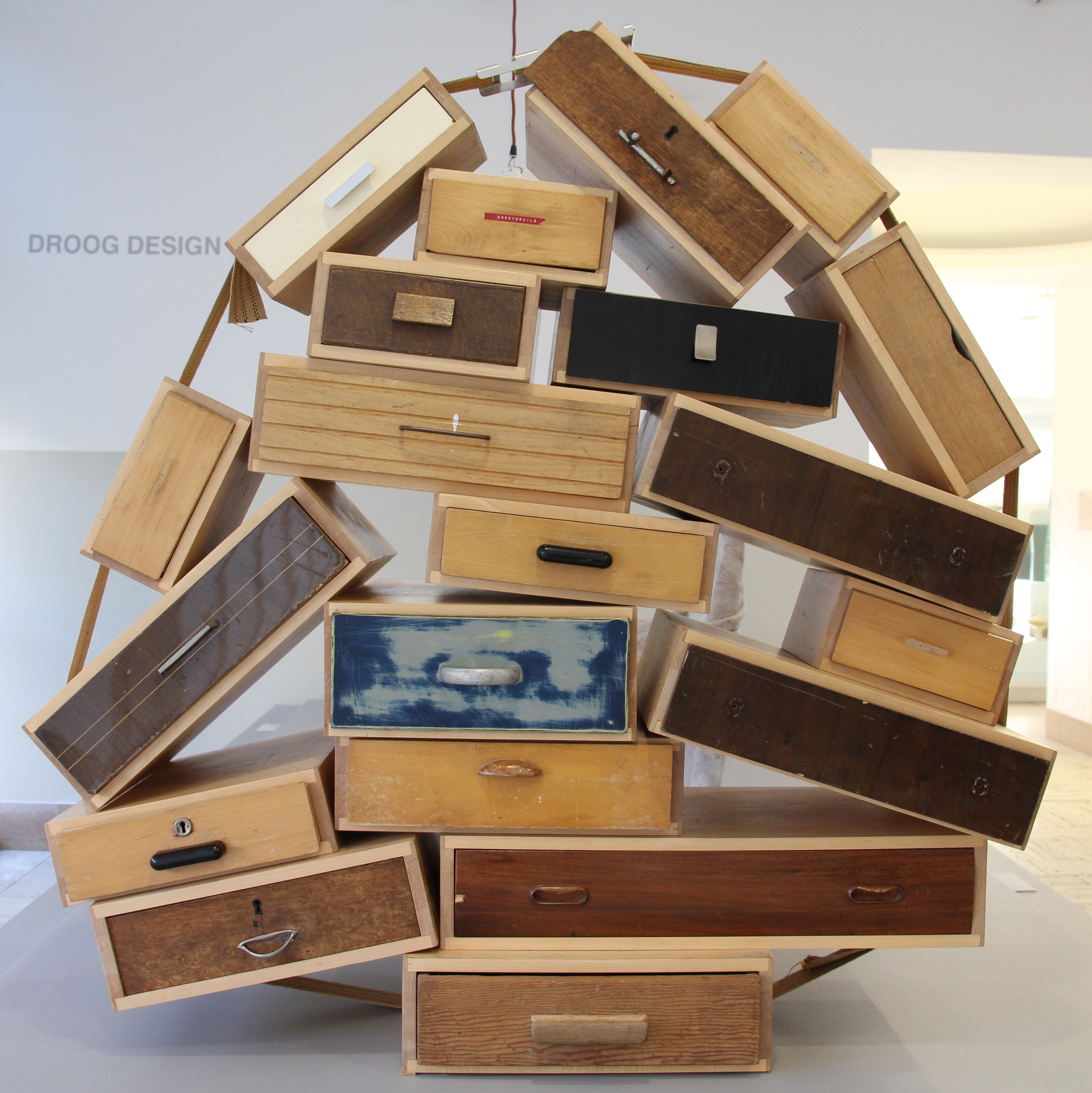
You Can't Lay Down Your Memory (Note: Pictured example is in the collection of the Museum Boijmans Van Beuningen, Rotterdam) by Tejo Remy for Droog (1991)

The variety of objects presented ranged from an original 1960s Sacco bean bag chair designed by Piero Gatti, Cesare Paolini, and Franco Teodoro, to the omnipresent, mass-produced, and anonymously designed injection moulded plastic monoblock garden chair; from the creations of familiar names like Charles and Ray Eames or Virgil Abloh, to familiar objects by less well-known creators like Art Fry and Spencer Silver, Sara Blakely, Jerry Manock, or the Décolletage Plastique design team; from industrially manufactured products like a 1980s Sony Walkman portable cassette player, to bespoke, handcrafted, and experimental curiosities such as a chest of drawers by Tejo Remy titled You Can't Lay Down Your Memory, various objects designed by Christien Meindertsma and made from flax, and a macramé-carbon fibre chair by Marcel Wanders; and from the patented and trademarked yet widely copied Moka Express coffee pot, to the freely licensed, open source, 3D printed Free Universal Construction Kit by Golan Levin and Shawn Sims.

The pieces on view were mostly from MoMA's collection and represented the work of 118 artists, designers, inventors, and other creators – an extensive display through which visitors were "guided only by wall text ... interrupted by the occasional interactive installation" such as early 1960s View-Master stereoscopes.

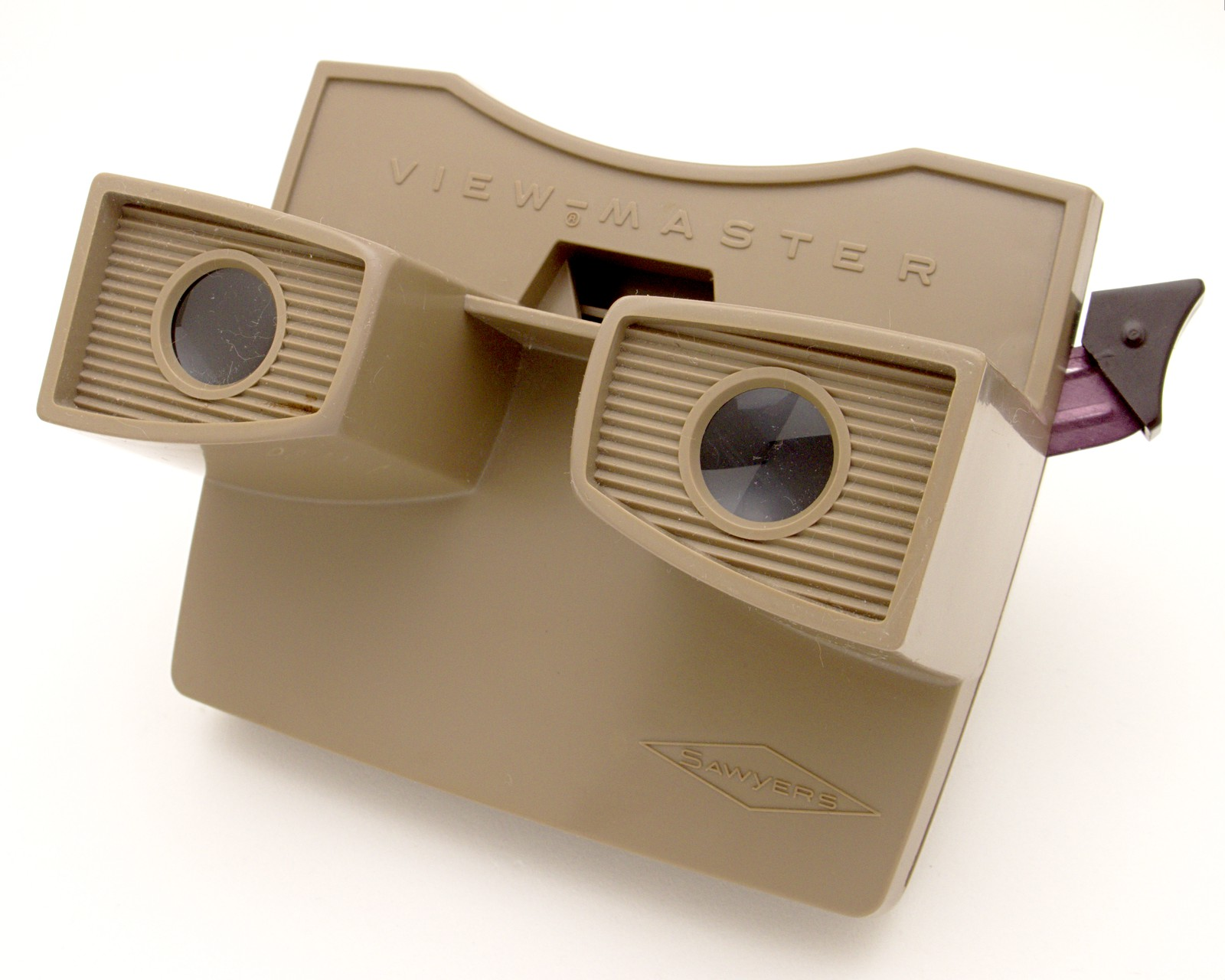
View-Master Model G by Chuck Harrison (1962)

Events held in support of the exhibition included an Abecedarium during which "twenty-six designers, scholars, DJs, photographers, and entrepreneurs [discussed] one paradigm-shifting object or idea, each corresponding to one letter of the alphabet". The day-long series of talks, staged in the museum's Celeste Bartos theater, presented the audience with "a steady stream of objects, voices, and perspectives" and an opportunity to "discover how objects and designs" from Post-it notes to the tampon "changed our culture and society." Participants included Alice Rawsthorn (Q for Quotidian), Sarah Kaufman (U for Universal), Susan Kare (I for Icon), Norman Teague (C for Chair), Andrés Jaque (K for Kitchen), Brandon Blackwood (L for Luxury), and Caterina Fake (Y for Yesterday).

== Reception and criticism ==
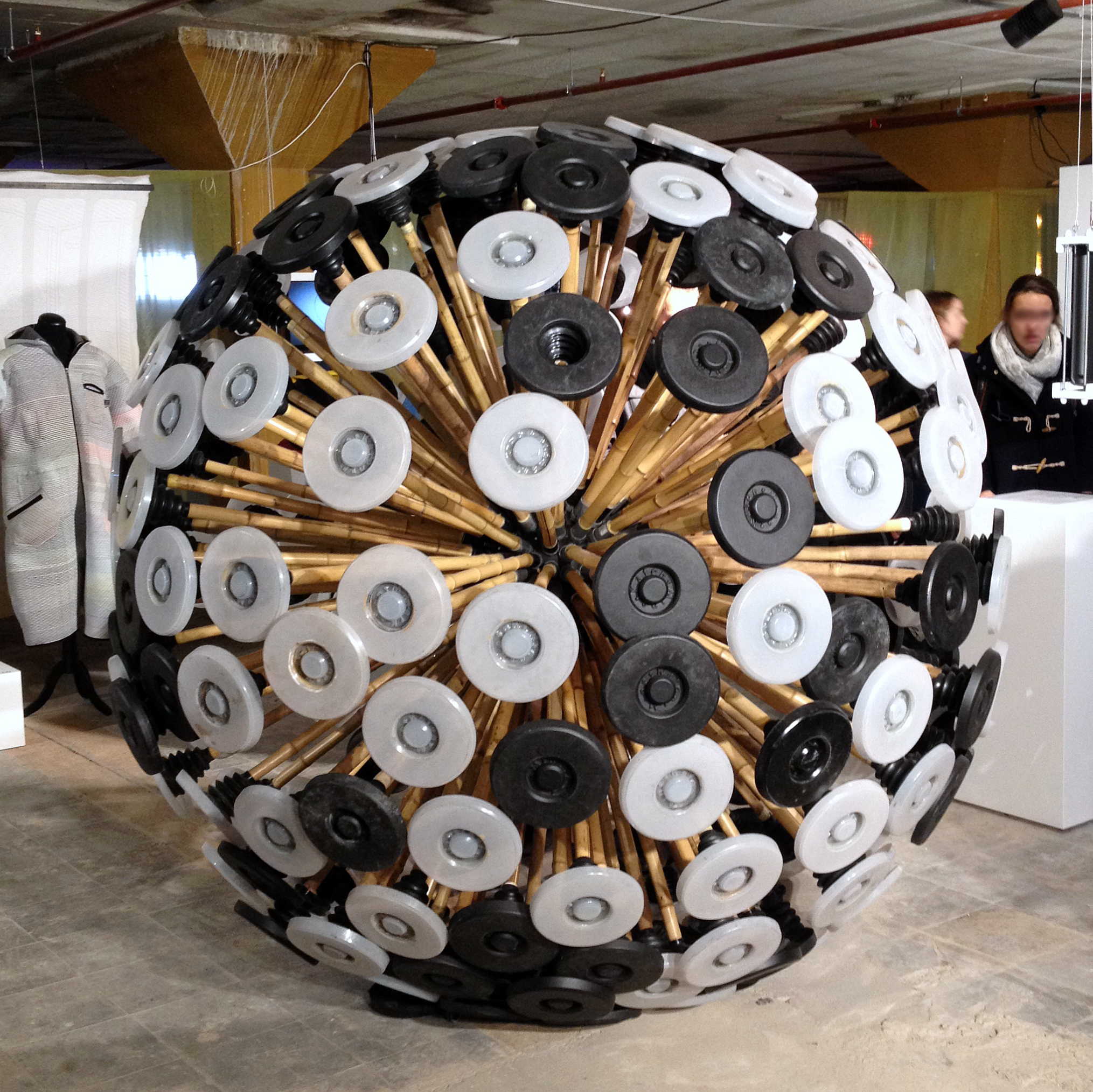
Mine Kafon (Note: Pictured in 2015 during Dutch Design Week, Eindhoven.) wind-powered deminer by Massoud Hassani (2011)

The show was described as an "ode to the power of design" which is intended to underscore "how important design is as a social force and a form of human expression", and to offer "a captivating reflection on the power of design to change behavior". Other sources observed that the exhibition "showcases the industrial design of our never-ending age of anxiety."

Mark Feeney, writing in The Boston Globe, remarked that "both the deminer and Bracelet of Life leave considerations of mere aesthetics far behind. They're a reminder that good design can be a literal matter of life and death." Feeney compared Hawkins's warming stripes to a Morris Louis painting, observing that "seen in strictly visual terms, the graphic is quite pleasing [while] understood conceptually, it's alarming to contemplate." He also noted that "some of the most striking and/or highest-profile designs in 'Pirouette' are incorporeal", referring to Glaser's I ❤ NY logo, Kare's original Mac GUI icons, as well as other computer graphics featured in the exhibition such as "digital typefaces ... the @ sign for email [and] Google map pins".

In reference to the inclusion of political provocations like the Gay Pride flag and a "giant, dandelion-like anti-landmine device", Architectural Record observed that "in a climate where even the most anodyne appeals for inclusion and peace suddenly seem so aberrant, Antonelli's game feels like a surprisingly brave one." The review also remarked that "putting the everyday, the ephemeral, and the commercial under the intellectual spotlight" shows to what extent MoMA and its curator are willing to go in order to "broaden the purview of the institution – and presumably its audience".
