= Bic Phone =

Mobile phone model

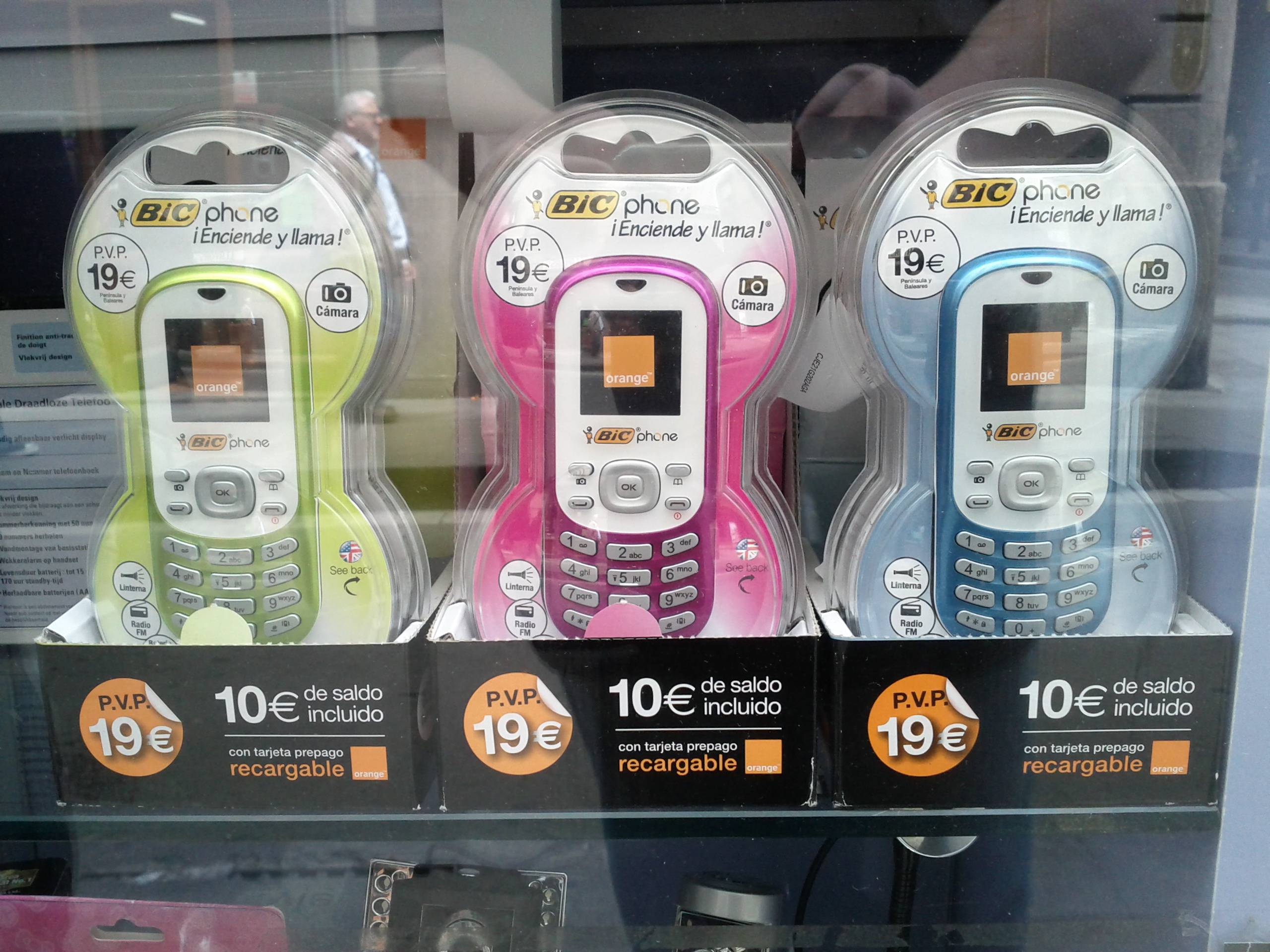
- Manufacturer: Alcatel subcontractor
- Availability by region: since 2008 (France), since July 2009 (Spain), since 2010 (Belgium)
- Related: Alcatel OT-S210
- Compatible networks: GSM bands 900 and 1800
- Form factor: Bar
- Dimensions: 98×44×12.3 mm (3.86×1.73×0.48 in)
- Weight: 70 g (2 oz)
- Battery: 4 h call time, 240 h standby
- Display: 1.5", 128×128 pixels, 65,000 colours
- Connectivity: Micro USB connector for charging

The Bic Phone is a variant of the Alcatel OT-S210 GSM mobile phone. An inexpensive phone with only the most basic of features, it is marketed in France and Spain by Orange as a "disposable" phone to casual customers. Société Bic, a French maker of disposable items, receives royalties for the use of its brand, but is not otherwise involved with the manufacture or distribution of the phone.

In Belgium, it was announced on June 21, 2010 that the Bic Phone will be marketed by Proximus, a subsidiary of Belgacom. However, it is purposely not marketed as a "disposable" phone but rather a low-entry phone seeing battery recharges are unlimited and the contract can be topped up just like any other prepaid card.

The phone is sold ready for immediate use, with a pre-charged battery and a certain number of free minutes. It can then be recharged with prepaid cards. The package also includes a hands-free kit and a micro USB charger. The phone features an alarm clock, a watch, a calculator, a camera, and an FM radio receiver. It can send and receive SMS messages, but has no multimedia functionality.
