= Christien Meindertsma =

Dutch artist and designer (born 1980)

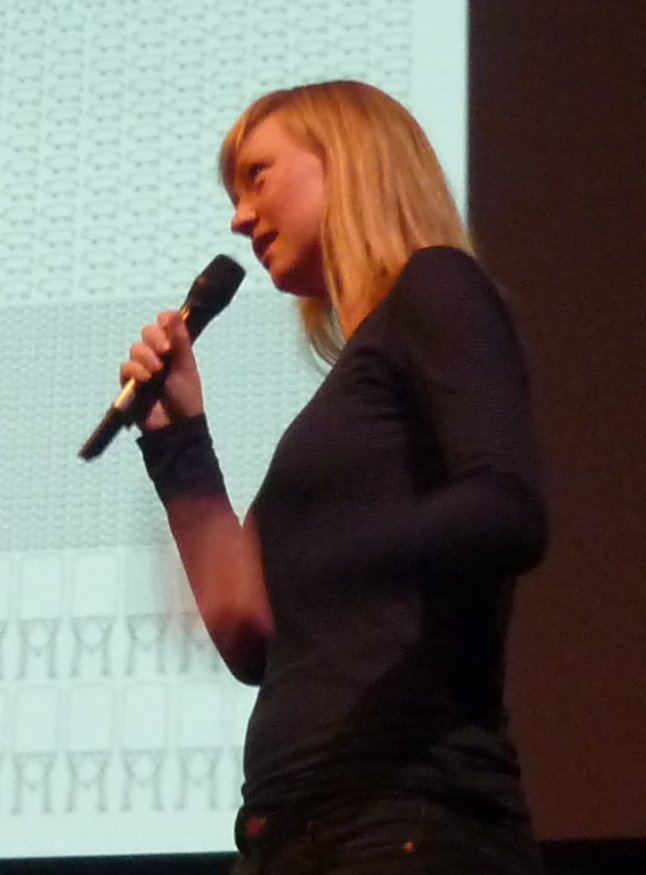
- Meindertsma in 2011
- Born: 1980 (age 45–46); Utrecht
- Education: Design Academy Eindhoven
- Occupations: Artist, photographer, designer
- Notable work: PIG 05049
- Awards: International Jury Award (2016, 2008); International Jury Award (2008); Profielprijs (2019); Young Designer Award (2008); Dutch Design Award 'Communication' (Julie Joliat, PIG 05049, 2008); Dutch Design Award 'Product' (FLAX Chair, 2016); Dutch Design Award 'Product' (Het Verzameld Breiwerk van Loes Veenstra uit de 2e Carnissestraat, 2013); Dutch Design Award 'Best Commissioning' (Rotterdam Circulair, 2023)
- Website: www.christienmeindertsma.com

Christien Meindertsma (born 1980) is a Dutch artist and designer.

== Early life and education ==
Christien Meindertsma was born in Utrecht in the Netherlands. She attended Design Academy Eindhoven and graduated in 2003. She trained under Hella Jongerius. She lives and works in Asperen.

=== Work ===
Meindertsma's work often examines the use of raw material. Her first major work was Checked Baggage, which is a book. The book has photographs of 3,267 items that were collected from airline passengers at the security checkpoints at Amsterdam Schiphol Airport. Her next book, PIG 05049, is about how many ways one pig can be used by people in manufacturing. PIG 05049 is in the collection of the Museum of Modern Art. She has created art for The Nature Conservancy. In 2010, Meindertsma presented a TED Talk about the book. She has designed lamps out of flax and has done projects for Droog. She has also designed sweaters. Each sweater uses wool from one specific Dutch sheep. In 2012 she was artist in residence at the Textielmuseum Tilburg. She has also partnered with Thomas Eyck.

Her work has been exhibited at the Museum of Modern Art, the Cooper-Hewitt, National Design Museum, Vitra Design Museum, National Gallery of Victoria, and the Victoria & Albert Museum, and is held in the collections of the Zuiderzee Museum and the Fries Museum.

In 2025, the Museum of Modern Art added her Flax Chair to its collection and included the piece in Pirouette: Turning Points in Design, an exhibition featuring "widely recognized design icons [...] highlighting pivotal moments in design history."

== Bibliography ==
- Meindertsma, Christien. PIG 05049. Flocks. ISBN 9081241311
