= George Bon Salle =

American basketball player

Personal information
- Born: July 1, 1935 Chicago, Illinois
- Died: July 20, 2015 (aged 80) South Miami, Florida
- Listed height: 6 ft 8 in (2.03 m)
- Listed weight: 220 lb (100 kg)

Career information
- High school: Loyola Academy (Chicago, Illinois)
- College: Illinois (1954–1957)
- NBA draft: 1957: 1st round, 7th overall pick
- Drafted by: Syracuse Nationals
- Playing career: 1957–1962
- Position: Power forward
- Number: 33

Career history
- 1957–1958: Olimpia Milano
- 1958–1959: Denver Truckers
- 1961–1962: Chicago Packers

Career highlights
- Second-team All-American – NABC (1957)
- Stats at NBA.com
- Stats at Basketball Reference
Medals
Representing United States
Men's basketball
Pan American Games
Gold medal – first place	1959 Chicago	Team Competition

George H. Bon Salle (July 1, 1935 – July 20, 2015) was an American professional basketball player. A 6 ft 8 in (2.03 m) forward, he starred at Loyola Academy in Chicago, Illinois, before playing at the University of Illinois. As a senior in 1957, Bon Salle was awarded All-American honors, and he was selected by the NBA's Syracuse Nationals in that year's professional draft. However, Bon Salle never played for the Nationals. He spent part of his professional career with the National Industrial Basketball League's Denver Truckers. A gold-medalist at the 1959 Pan-American Games, Bon Salle also played briefly for the NBA's Chicago Packers (now the Washington Wizards) during the 1961–62 season.

He collected the posters of the French graphic artist Bernard Villemot and published a catalogue raisonné of those works.

== Career statistics ==
Legend
GP	Games played	GS	Games started	MPG	Minutes per game
FG%	Field goal percentage	3P%	3-point field goal percentage	FT%	Free throw percentage
RPG	Rebounds per game	APG	Assists per game	SPG	Steals per game
BPG	Blocks per game	PPG	Points per game	**Bold**	Career high

=== NBA ===
==== Regular season ====
Year	Team	GP	MPG	FG%	FT%	RPG	APG	PPG
1961–62	Chicago	3	3.0	.250	–	.7	.0	1.3
