= We Are One (film) =

2020 documentary film

- Film poster
- French: On est ensemble
- Directed by: Stéphane de Freitas
- Starring: Afaq; Panmela Castro; Stéphane de Freitas
- Distributed by: Netflix
- Release date: July 14, 2020
- Running time: 86 minutes
- Country: France
- Language: French

We Are One (French: On est ensemble) is a 2020 documentary film directed by Stéphane de Freitas and starring Afaq, Panmela Castro and Stéphane de Freitas. It is about how French musician Matthieu Chedid brings together activists from around the world to be part of a video of the song Solidarité (Solidarity) that he wrote. The film was released on July 14, 2020, on Netflix.
