= Centraal Beheer =

Dutch insurance company

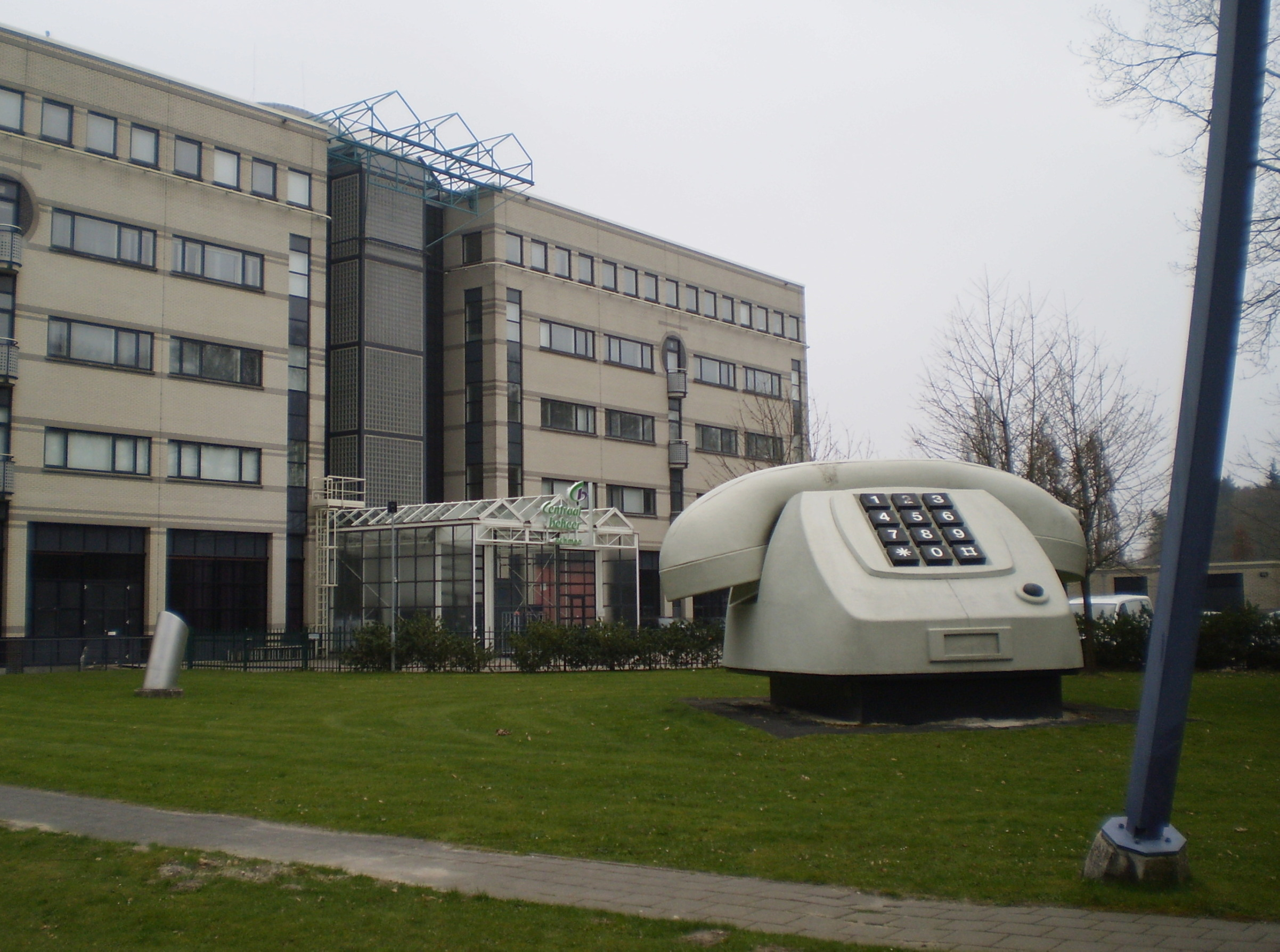
- The office of Centraal Beheer in Apeldoorn
- Company type: Subsidiary
- Industry: Financial services
- Founded: 1909; 117 years ago
- Headquarters: Amsterdam, Netherlands
- Parent: Achmea
- Website: www.centraalbeheer.nl

Centraal Beheer is an insurance company located in Apeldoorn, Netherlands. It became part of Achmea in 2001. Centraal Beheer is usually referred to as "Apeldoorn". Its offices are known for its architecture by Herman Hertzberger. The company is noted for its external relations, in particular with startups.

Centraal Beheer's advertising slogan is Even Apeldoorn bellen (Just call Apeldoorn), in use since 1985. Many of its TV commercials feature people causing big problems, played for comical effect, which culminate in the slogan. A few of these commercials have won the Dutch Gouden Loeki award for Best Commercial, in 2001, 2004 and 2006. In 2011 Even Apeldoorn bellen was declared the "most classic advertising slogan of all time" in the Netherlands by visitors of the Dutch exhibition ReclameKlassiekers.
