= Monks (media company) =

Global marketing and technology services firm

- Formerly: MediaMonks (2001-2024)
- Type: Public (SFOR.L)
- Industry: Advertising; Professional services; Information technology consulting
- Founded: 2001; 25 years ago
- Founders: Founders: Wesley ter Haar; Gin Roberscheuten; Terrence de Kat (formerly Terrence Koeman)
- Headquarters: London, United Kingdom
- Area served: Worldwide
- Key people: Sir Martin Sorrell (Chairman); Victor Knaap (CEO, Europe); Justin Billingsley (CGO, Marketing); David Kullmann (CRO, Technology); Brady Brim-DeForest (CEO, Technology; Bruno Lambertini (CEO, Marketing)
- Products: Monks.Flow (AI Platform)
- Revenue: £1.01 billion (2023)
- Number of employees: 7,500+ (2024)
- Parent: S4Capital plc
- Website: www.monks.com

Monks is a digital-first marketing, technology services and consulting company that connects content, data and digital media and technology services and provides solutions in the consulting, enterprise software, gaming, film, social, digital advertising, data, and measurement ecosystems. It is a wholly owned subsidiary of S4 Capital, Plc.

== History ==
=== Formation and early years ===
The company was founded in Hilversum, the Netherlands in January 2001 as "MediaMonks B.V." by Terrence de Kat, Wesley ter Haar, and Gin Roberscheuten.

Since then the company's head office had been based in Hilversum. First in an illegal basement, dug under Grand Hotel Gooiland, later in a space that was previously used for a cannabis-growing operation (and hence still had the massive steel bars on the windows to deter theft, giving the offices an industrial look).

Eventually that location was outgrown, and MediaMonks rented multiple floors of a building called "Silverpoint" in the same city for the more than 100 'monks' (employees) at that point.

Victor Knaap joined the company in 2003, as "Sales Monk" and would manage it as CEO from 2004 until 2018, at first acquiring a 15% share in the company, but later an equal 25% to the other three owners. Monks joined the Society of Digital Agencies (SoDA) in 2012, with Ter Haar serving as chairman of that collective today. Monks won 23 Lions at Cannes, including one for the Universal Typeface Experiment in 2014.

=== Acquisition by S4Capital ===
In July 2018, S4Capital plc purchased Monks for $350 million.

The company's head office was moved to London, United Kingdom.

In 2018, S4 Capital acquired data and digital media firm, MightyHive for $150 million. MediaMonks and MightyHive were later merged under the combined Media.Monks brand.

The former "Head Creative of Film", who quit and sold his shares in the company at the end of 2017 (more than 6 months before the acquisition by S4Capital), sued the company in August 2019. He argued that had he known about the upcoming acquisition, he would not have decided to quit. The lawsuit was settled in December 2019.

=== Post Acquisition ===
In January 2021, S4Capital merged Decoded and Metric Theory into MediaMonks. Jam3 joined MediaMonks in March 2021, and, in August of the same year, all 24 S4Capital companies, plus culture agency Cashmere, became part of Media.Monks. Further mergers include TheoremOne, and XX Artists, both in 2022.

Media.Monks was the fastest growing company in The Netherlands in 2021 and 2022.

On July 18, 2024, Media.Monks was rebranded to Monks, with a focus on AI. Campaign US noted this occurred in the midst of the introduction of new AI products, an earnings miss, and multiple acquisitions.

== Awards ==
In January 2020, Monks was the first company to be awarded 200 Favourite Website Awards.

Monks was awarded a 2022 Peabody Award in the Immersive & Interactive category for The Uncensored Library project. The project's profile page describes the library as "a monument to press freedom and an innovative back door for access to censored content."
