= László Bíró =

Hungarian-Argentine inventor (1899–1985)

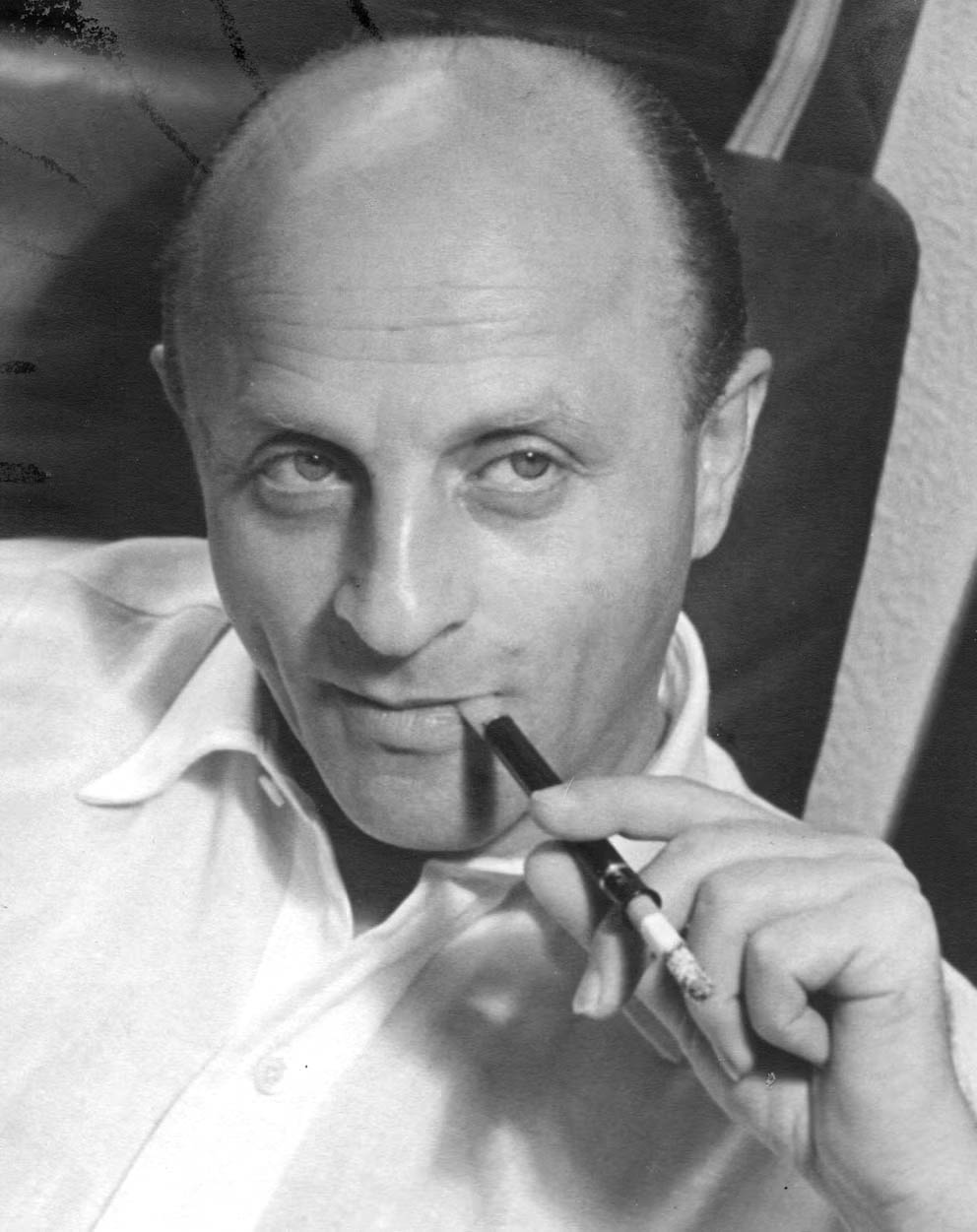
- Bíró in the 1950s
- Born: László József Schweiger; 29 September 1899; Budapest, Austria-Hungary
- Died: 24 October 1985 (aged 86); Buenos Aires, Argentina
- Other names: Ladislas Jozsef Biro; Ladislao José Biro
- Known for: Inventor of the first commercially successful ballpoint pen
- Spouse: Erzsébet Schick (m. 1931)
- Children: 1

László József Bíró (Hungarian: [ˈlaːsloː ˈjoːʒɛf ˈbiːroː]; né Schweiger; 29 September 1899 – 24 October 1985), Hispanicized as Ladislao José Biro, was a Hungarian and Argentine inventor who patented the first commercially successful modern ballpoint pen. The first ballpoint pen had been invented roughly 50 years earlier by John J. Loud, but it was not a commercial success.

== Early life ==
Bíró was born to a Hungarian Jewish family in Budapest, Kingdom of Hungary, within the Austro-Hungarian Empire, in 1899 to Mózes Mátyás Schweiger and Janka Ullmann. The Schweigers changed their name to Bíró in 1905. After leaving school, Bíró began work as a journalist in Hungary.

== Invention of the ballpoint pen ==
While working as a journalist, Bíró noticed that the ink used in newspaper printing dried quickly, leaving the paper dry and smudge-free. He tried using the same ink in a fountain pen, but found that it would not flow into the tip, as it was too viscous. In 1930 he observed children playing with marbles in a puddle, noticing that the marbles left a trail of water in their wake. This gave him an idea: Why not use a ball-shaped metal nib for writing, which became the initial design idea for the ball pen.

Bíró presented the first production of the ballpoint pen at the Budapest International Fair in 1931. Working with his brother György, a chemist, he developed a new tip consisting of a ball that was free to turn in a socket, and as it turned it would pick up a special viscous ink from a cartridge and then roll to deposit it on the paper. Bíró patented the invention in Paris in 1938.

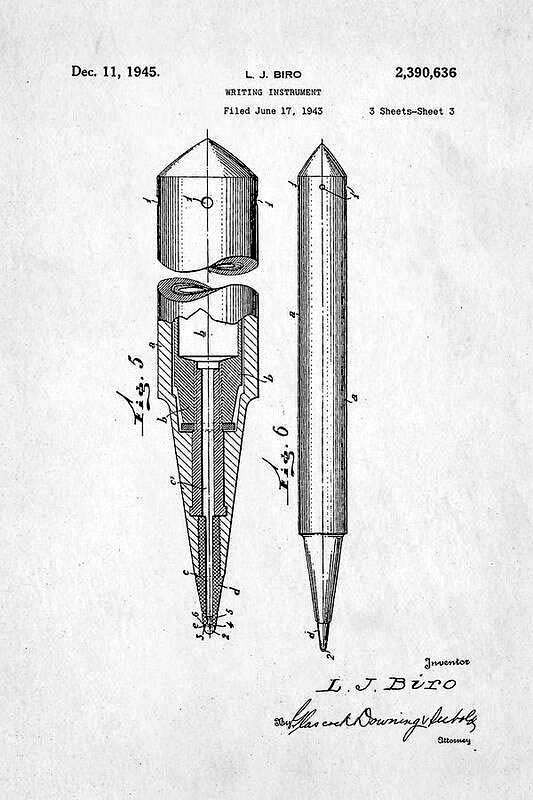
Ballpoint pen patent filed in 1943

During World War II, Bíró fled the Nazis with his brother. They relocated to Argentina in 1943 at the invitation of the President of Argentina, Agustin Justo, who met the inventor in Yugoslavia while on vacation, noticing the unusual writing implement. On 17 June 1943, the brothers filed another patent, issued in the US as "US Patent 2,390,636 Writing Instrument" and formed Biro Pens of Argentina (in Argentina and Uruguay the ballpoint pen is known as birome, a portmanteau of the brothers' surname with that of their business partner, Juan Jorge Meyne). This new design was supposedly licensed for production in the United Kingdom for supply to Royal Air Force aircrew.

In 1945, Marcel Bich bought the patent for the pen from Bíró. The resulting designs, including the Bic Cristal, became the main products of his company Société Bic S.A., which has since sold more than 100 billion ballpoint pens worldwide. In November of that same year, promoter Milton Reynolds introduced a gravity-fed pen to the US market, to try to get around Biro's patent, which was based on capillary action, where fresh ink is drawn out of the reservoir of the pen as ink is deposited on the paper. Because the Reynolds workaround depended on a gravity feed, it did not infringe, but required thinner ink and a larger barrel.

== Personal life and death ==
In 1931, Bíró married to Erzsébet Schick in Terézváros. In 1938, Bíró and his wife converted to Lutheranism.

László Bíró died in Buenos Aires, Argentina, on October 24, 1985.

== Legacy ==
A ballpoint pen is widely referred to as a "biro" in many countries, including the UK, Ireland, New Zealand, Australia and Italy. Although the word is a registered trademark, in some countries it has become genericised.

Argentina's Inventors' Day is celebrated on Bíró's birthday, 29 September. On 29 September 2016, the 117th anniversary of his birth, Google commemorated Bíró with a Google Doodle for "his relentless, forward-thinking spirit".
