= Awwwards =

Website promoting innovative web design

- Awarded for: "Discover, recognize, and promote the talent of web designers, developers, and agencies who create unique digital experiences."
- Country: Spain
- First award: 2009 - Present
- Website: Awwwards.com

Awwwards (Awwwards Online SL) is an organization that hosts web design competitions and conferences across Europe and the United States. Website owners and developers can participate by submitting their websites for review. Submissions are assessed by a jury, and top entries are presented and awarded prizes on a rotational basis.

== Nomination process ==
Web designers submit their websites through Awwwards' platform for consideration for the Site of the Day. A jury, composed of industry professionals, and the Awwwards community evaluate the entries. The best daily sites are published annually in "The 365 Best Websites Around the World" book.

== Jury ==
The jury consists of international designers, developers, and agencies who assess the creativity, technical skills, and insight of the submitted web projects. The panel's expertise ensures a comprehensive review process.

=== Developer Award ===
Awwwards, in partnership with Microsoft, created the Developer Award to recognize web developers who demonstrate excellence in creating websites that meet modern standards. The award highlights websites that work seamlessly across various platforms and devices, using best practices in HTML5, JavaScript, and CSS.

== Annual winners ==
Some prominent Site of the Year winners include Mercedes-Benz, Bloomberg L.P., Bose Corporation, Warner Brothers, Volkswagen, Uber, and Google.

== Awwwards conference ==
Awwwards also organizes two-day conferences featuring speakers from major tech companies and industry leaders such as Microsoft, Google, Spotify, Adobe, Opera, and Smashing Magazine. These events focus on the latest trends in web design and development.

Speakers at Awwwards conferences have included notable figures in the design and technology industry such as Stefan Sagmeister, Paula Scher, and design leaders from companies including Wix.

== Corporate affairs ==
=== Platform ===
Awwwards operates an online platform where web designers and developers submit websites for evaluation and awards. Submitted projects are reviewed by a jury based on design, usability, creativity, and content. The platform also serves as a community hub for discovering digital trends, showcasing work, and accessing educational resources including talks and interviews.

Design professionals from international companies have participated in Awwwards events and platform content. For example, Wix, a cloud-based web development company known for its website builder tools, has featured prominently in Awwwards conferences, with its design leadership contributing to discussions on design trends and creative thinking.

== See also ==
- Favourite Web Awards
- Webby Awards
- List of Web Awards
