= World Day Against Cyber Censorship =

Annual online event

World Day Against Cyber Censorship is an online event held each year on March 12 to draw attention to the ways that governments around the world are deterring and censoring free speech online.

== Netizen Prize (2010-2014) ==
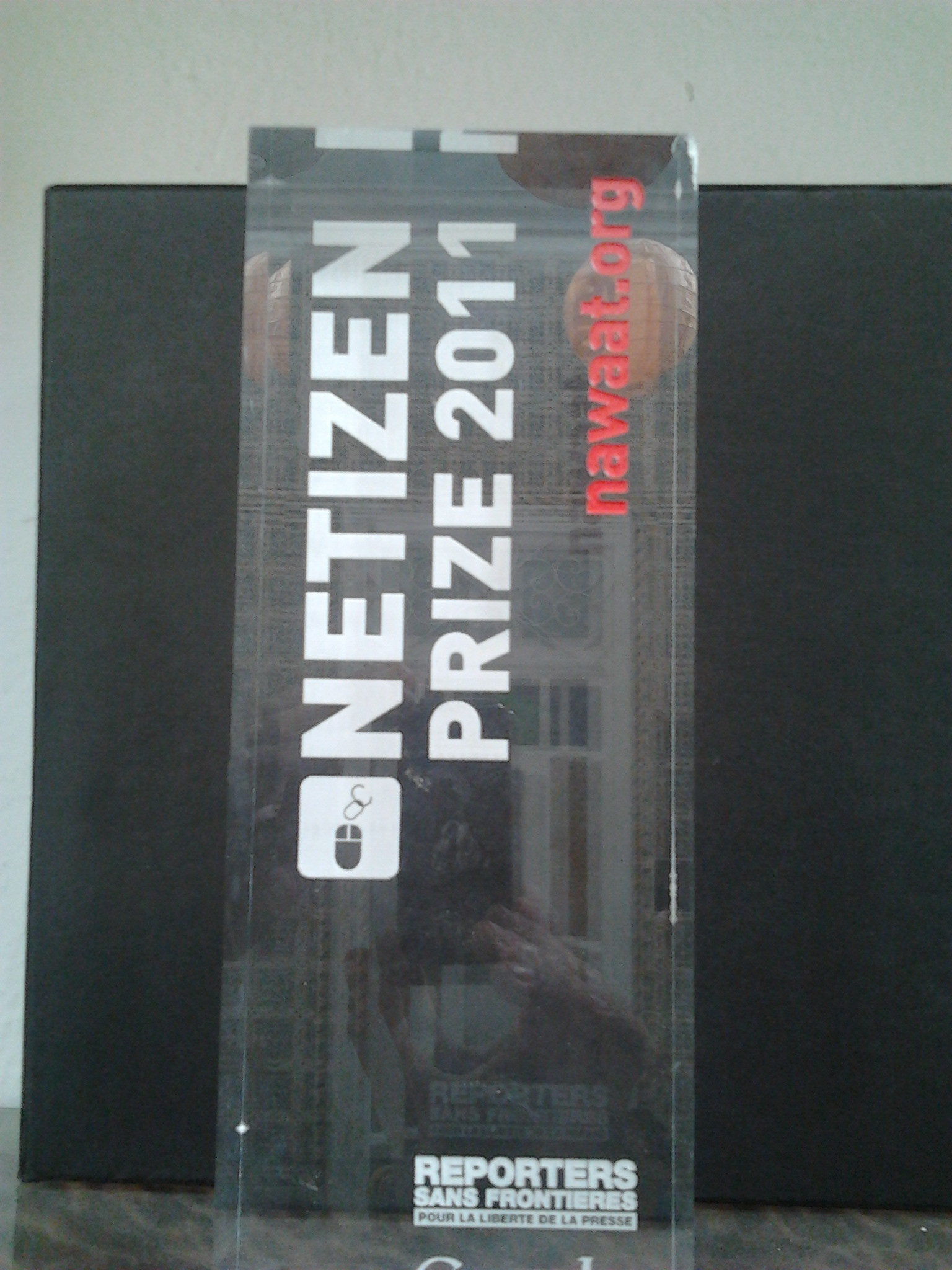
RWB 2011 Netizen Prize

On World Day Against Cyber Censorship, Reporters Without Borders awards an annual Netizen Prize that recognizes an Internet user, blogger, cyber-dissident, or group who has made a notable contribution to the defense of online freedom of expression. Starting in 2010 the prize has been awarded to:

- 2010: Iranian women's rights activists of the Change for Equality website, www.we-change.org.
- 2011: the founders of a Tunisian blogging group named Nawaat.org.
- 2012: Syrian citizen journalists and activists of the Media center of the Local Coordination Committees.
- 2013: Vietnamese blogger Huynh Ngoc Chenh.
- 2014: Saudi Arabian blogger Raif Badawi.

== Enemies of the Internet list (2006–2014) ==
In conjunction with World Day Against Cyber Censorship, Reporters Without Borders published its Enemies of the Internet list periodically from 2006–2014.

== See also ==
- Internet censorship and surveillance by country
