= Raymond Savignac =

French graphic artist

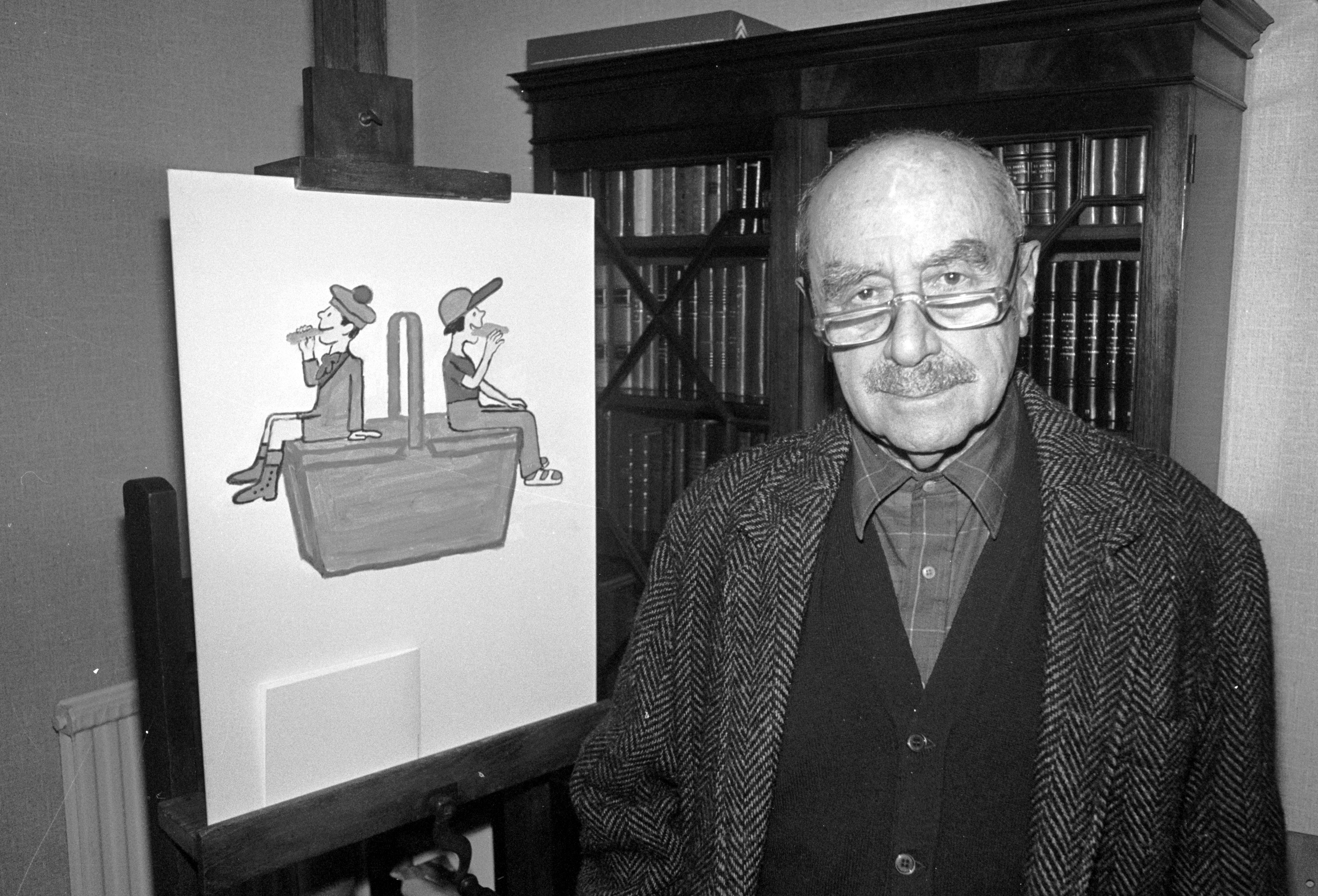
Raymond Savignac at home

Raymond Savignac (French: [saviɲak]; 6 November 1907, Paris, – 29 October 2002, Trouville-sur-Mer), often just abbreviated to "Savignac", was a French graphic artist famous for his commercial posters. His work is distinguished by a humorous simplicity.

Self-taught, he started designing posters under the direction of Cassandre, but met his greatest success with the poster for Yoplait yogurt, which featured the udders of a cow directly supplying the "milk yogurt" with milk.

Another famous poster was for the 1962 film La Guerre des boutons (The War of Buttons).

In 1949, Savignac's works were exhibited with those of his contemporary poster artist Bernard Villemot at the Gallery of Beaux Arts in Paris. A permanent display of his work may be found at the Montebello Museum in Trouville, where he spent his last years. There is also a beachfront walk dedicated to him. Many of his posters depicted the Norman seaside town. These works can be seen there. His murals can be seen also around town.
