= TheFWA =

FWA - a professional web design and development competition body

The FWA
- Sponsored by: Rackfish, FontShop International
- Country: England, United Kingdom
- First award: 2000
- Website: https://thefwa.com/

Precedence
- Equivalent: Favourite Website Awards

FWA (Favourite Website Awards) is an international award platform that honors and rewards web designers, developers and agencies around the world for excellence within the field of web design and development. The FWA was founded in May 2000 by Rob Ford.

In November 2012, The FWA was the most visited website award program in the history of the internet, with over 170 millions site visits.

== Jury ==
The FWA jury is composed of more than 500 web professionals (200 women + 200 men) from 35 countries.

== Awards granted ==
- FWA of the Day (FOTD) : Every day, the FWA jury selects the best project,
- FWA of the Month (FOTM): Every month, the FWA jury selects the best project,
- People's Choice Award (PCA) : Every year, a public vote selects the people's favourite project,
- FWA of the Year (FOTY) : Every year, the FWA jury selects the best project.

== Hall Of Fame ==
The FWA Hall of Fame was established in May 2007 (to celebrate the seventh anniversary of the FWA), as a recognition of web's greatest individuals and companies.

== See also ==
- Awwwards
