= Cynthia Brewer =

American geographer (born 1960)

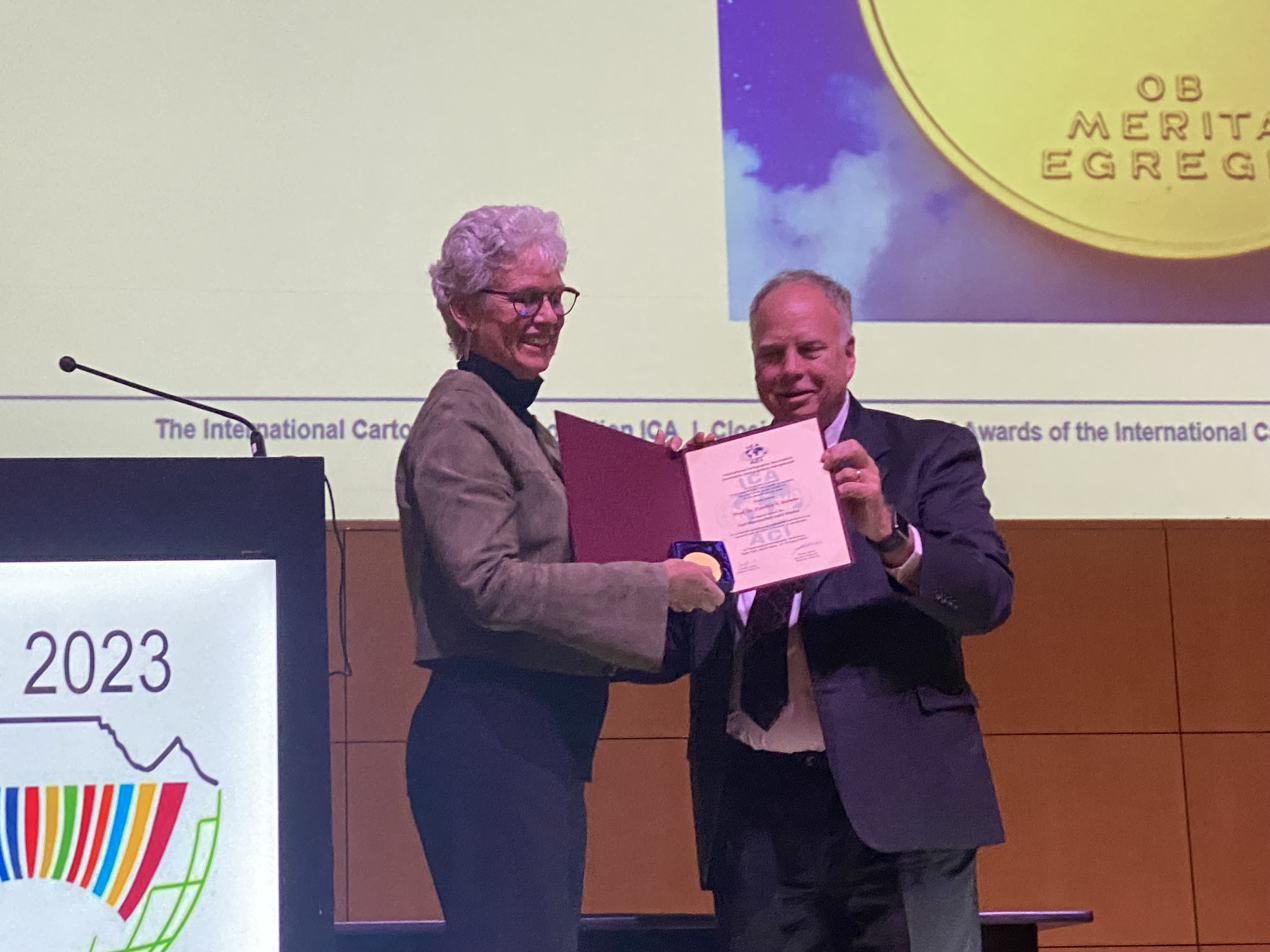
- Cynthia Brewer receiving the ICA Carl Mannerfelt Gold Medal from outgoing ICA President Tim Trainor at the International Cartographic Conference.
- Born: 1960 (age 65–66)
- Education: University of Guelph (BA); Michigan State University (MA, PhD)
- Known for: ColorBrewer
- Awards: Carl Mannerfelt Gold Medal (2023)
- Scientific career
- Workplaces: Pennsylvania State University
- Thesis: Prediction of Surround-Induced Changes in Map Color Appearance
- Website: sites.psu.edu/cbrewer/

Cynthia Ann Brewer (born 1960) is an American cartographer, author, and professor of geography at Pennsylvania State University. Brewer's specialty relates to visibility and color theory in cartography. In 2023, she was awarded the International Cartographic Association's highest honor, the Carl Mannerfelt Gold Medal, for her distinguished contribution to the field.

Her web, print, and colorblind-friendly sets of colors, known as the Brewer palettes, have been used by numerous projects. She is the creator of the online color palette tool ColorBrewer.

Brewer has worked as a map and atlas design consultant for the U.S. Census Bureau, National Cancer Institute, National Center for Health Statistics, and National Park Service. She teaches courses in introductory cartography and map design. She also works on topographic map design, multi-scale mapping, generalization, and atlas mapping. She has been influential as a theorist for map representations and GIS professionals.

== Education ==
She graduated from McMaster University (Ontario, Canada) in 1979 and the University of Guelph (Ontario, Canada) in 1983. She did her master's degree in geography with emphasis in cartography at Michigan State University, 1983 to 1986, presenting a thesis titled The Development of Process-Printed Munsell Charts for Selecting Map Colors. After a year at University of California at Santa Barbara, she obtained her doctorate from Michigan State University in 1991. Her dissertation was Prediction of Surround-Induced Changes in Map Color Appearance.

== Academic career ==
She was visiting lecturer at the University of California at Santa Barbara, Department of Geography during the year 1986/87. On completing her doctorate she was assistant professor, for three years (1991 to 1994) at San Diego State University. She joined the Pennsylvania State University, Department of Geography in 1994 and has been professor since 2007 and was head of the department from 2014 to 2021.

She has been a faculty member of the Center of Excellence for Geospatial Information Science (CEGIS), U.S. Geological Survey, Department of Interior, since 2008.

== ColorBrewer ==
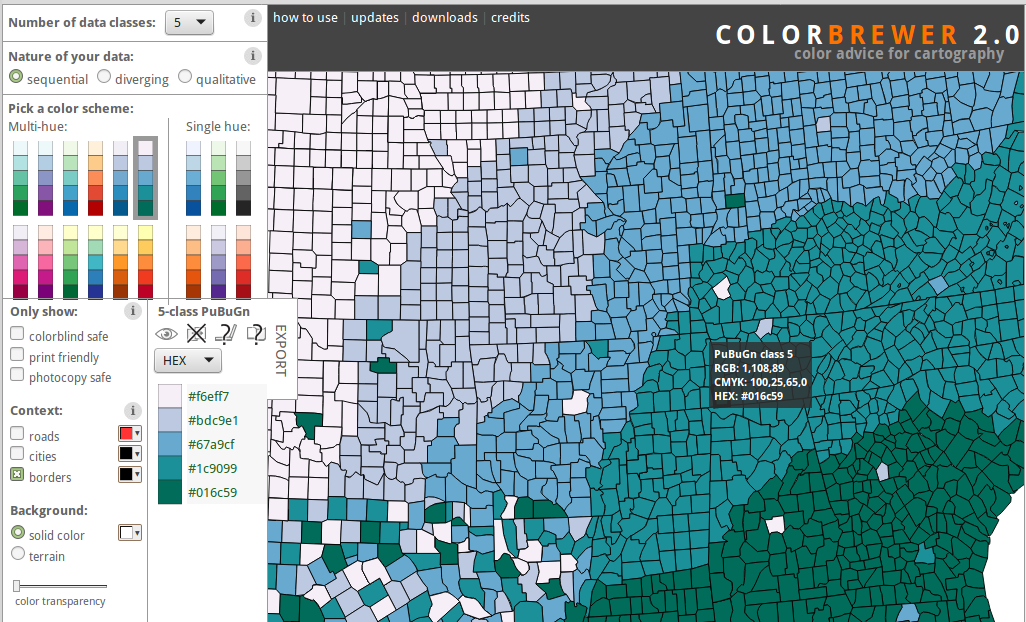
ColorBrewer screenshot

ColorBrewer is an online tool developed in 2002 for selecting thematic map color schemes based on Brewer's palettes. The ColorBrewer palettes have uses beyond cartography; in 2018 climatologist Ed Hawkins chose ColorBrewer reds and blues for warming stripes graphics portraying global warming.

== Publications ==
=== Books ===
- Brewer, Cynthia A. (2005), Designing Better Maps: A Guide for GIS Users, Esri Press, p. 220, ISBN 978-1589480896
- Brewer, Cynthia A. (2008), Designed Maps: A Sourcebook for GIS Users, Esri Press, p. 184, ISBN 978-1589481602
- Brewer, Cynthia A. (2015), Designing Better Maps: A Guide for GIS Users, 2nd Edition, Esri Press, p. 250, ISBN 978-1589484405

=== Articles ===
- Harrower, Mark; Brewer, Cynthia A. (2003), "ColorBrewer.org: An Online Tool for Selecting Colour Schemes for Maps" (PDF), The Cartographic Journal, 40 (1): 27–37, Bibcode:2003CartJ..40...27H, doi:10.1179/000870403235002042, S2CID 140173239, archived from the original (PDF) on 2013-05-10
- Brewer, Cynthia A. (2006), "Basic Mapping Principles for Visualizing Cancer Data Using Geographic Information Systems (GIS)" (PDF), American Journal of Preventive Medicine, 30 (2): S25–S36, doi:10.1016/j.amepre.2005.09.007, PMID 16458787, archived from the original (PDF) on 2010-06-25
- Brewer, Cynthia A.; Hatchard, Geoffrey W.; Harrower, Mark A. (2003), "ColorBrewer in Print: A Catalog of Color Schemes for Maps", Cartography and Geographic Information Science, 30 (1): 5–32 (28), Bibcode:2003CGISc..30....5B, doi:10.1559/152304003100010929, S2CID 129427665
- Brewer, Cynthia A. (2003), "A Transition in Improving Maps: The ColorBrewer Example", Cartography and Geographic Information Science, 30 (2): 159–162(4), Bibcode:2003CGISc..30..159B, doi:10.1559/152304003100011126, S2CID 62243305
- Brewer, Cynthia A. (1996), "Guidelines for Selecting Colors for Diverging Schemes on Maps", The Cartographic Journal, 33 (2): 79–86(8), Bibcode:1996CartJ..33...79B, doi:10.1179/caj.1996.33.2.79
- Olson, Judy M.; Brewer, Cynthia A. (1997). "An Evaluation of Color Selections to Accommodate Map Users with Color-Vision Impairments". Annals of the Association of American Geographers. 87 (1): 103–134. doi:10.1111/0004-5608.00043.

== Awards and honors ==
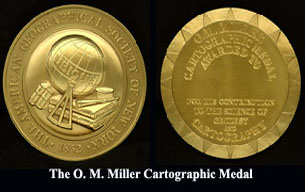

- Carl Mannerfelt Gold Medal, International Cartographic Society, 2023
- Osborn Maitland Miller Medal, American Geographical Society, 2019

== See also ==
- Anne Kelly Knowles – American geographer (born 1957)
- Chartjunk – Term for unnecessary visual elements in charts
- Duane Marble – American geographer (1931–2022)
- Edward Tufte – American statistician (born 1942)
- George F. Jenks – American geographer and cartographer
- GIS – System to capture, manage, and present geographic data
- Mark Monmonier – American geographer and cartographer
- Scientific visualization – Interdisciplinary branch of science concerned with presenting scientific data visually
- Waldo Tobler – American geographer
