= Ellie Highwood =

British climate scientist and consultant

Ellie Highwood FRMetS SFHEA
- Born: Eleanor Highwood
- Education: University of Manchester, University of Reading

Ellie Highwood is a British climate scientist who is a diversity and inclusion consultant and coach to academics, researchers and scientists.

She was formerly Professor of Climate Physics at the University of Reading and was head of that department from 2012 until 2015. She was previously a member of the RMetS Council and Education Committee. On 1 October 2016 she became the 81st President of the Royal Meteorological Society (RMetS), serving until 2018.

Highwood studied physics at the University of Manchester and then studied for a PhD at the University of Reading. Her research focuses on atmospheric particulates in climate, particularly the impact of aerosol on climate change and climate model simulations.

From 2015 to 2019 she also took on the role of Dean for Diversity and Inclusion at the University of Reading, which was a job share with Professor Simon Chandler-Wilde.

In 2019 she left the academic research world and started her own businesses focussing on developing inclusive organisations and supporting academics, researchers and scientists through individual and team coaching.

Her work on aerosols and their impact on climate and climate change has been discussed in notable publications, such as The Independent and the BBC. She has argued that cooling the planet artificially by "injecting tiny reflective particles into the atmosphere" (as proposed by Paul Crutzen, for example) could "cause droughts and climate chaos" in poor countries, albeit also stating that it would "be prudent to explore alternatives that might help us in the decades ahead".

A striped "global warming blanket" that she crocheted in 2017 was the inspiration for the now famous Warming stripes graphics that were devised by her University of Reading colleague Ed Hawkins.

== Selected bibliography ==
- Myhre, Gunnar, et al. "New estimates of radiative forcing due to well mixed greenhouse gases." Geophysical research letters 25.14 (1998): 2715–2718.
- Highwood, E. J., and B. J. Hoskins. "The tropical tropopause." Quarterly Journal of the Royal Meteorological Society 124.549 (1998): 1579–1604.
- Tanré, D., et al. "Measurement and modeling of the Saharan dust radiative impact: Overview of the Saharan Dust Experiment (SHADE)." Journal of Geophysical Research: Atmospheres (1984–2012) 108.D18 (2003).
- Highwood, Eleanor J., et al. "Radiative properties and direct effect of Saharan dust measured by the C‐130 aircraft during Saharan Dust Experiment (SHADE): 2. Terrestrial spectrum." Journal of Geophysical Research: Atmospheres (1984–2012) 108.D18 (2003).
- Abel, Steven J., et al. "Evolution of biomass burning aerosol properties from an agricultural fire in southern Africa." Geophysical Research Letters 30.15 (2003).
