= ColorBrewer =

Online color tool for cartography

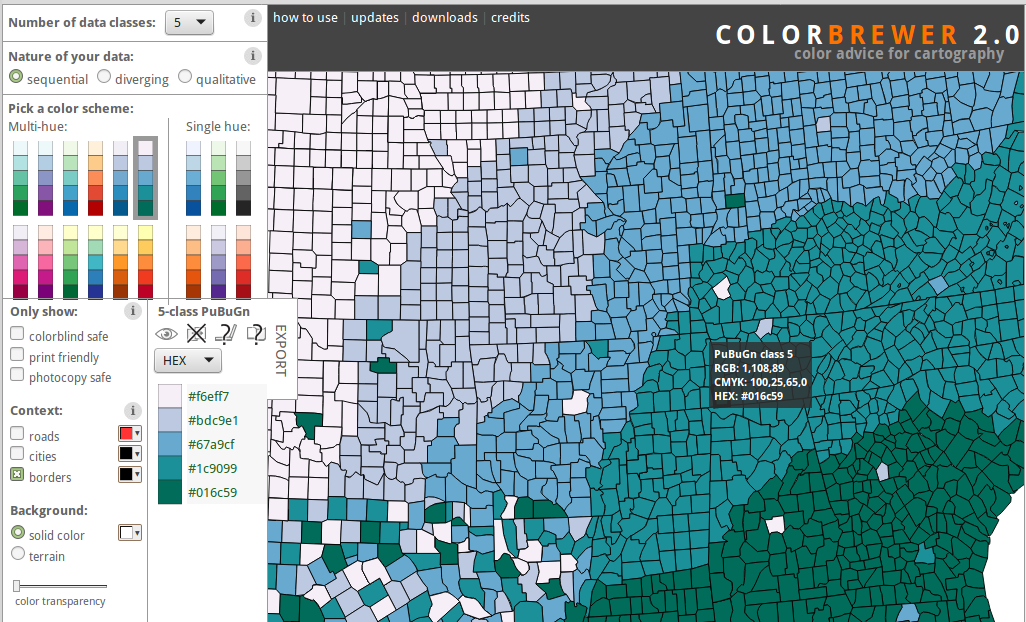
ColorBrewer screenshot

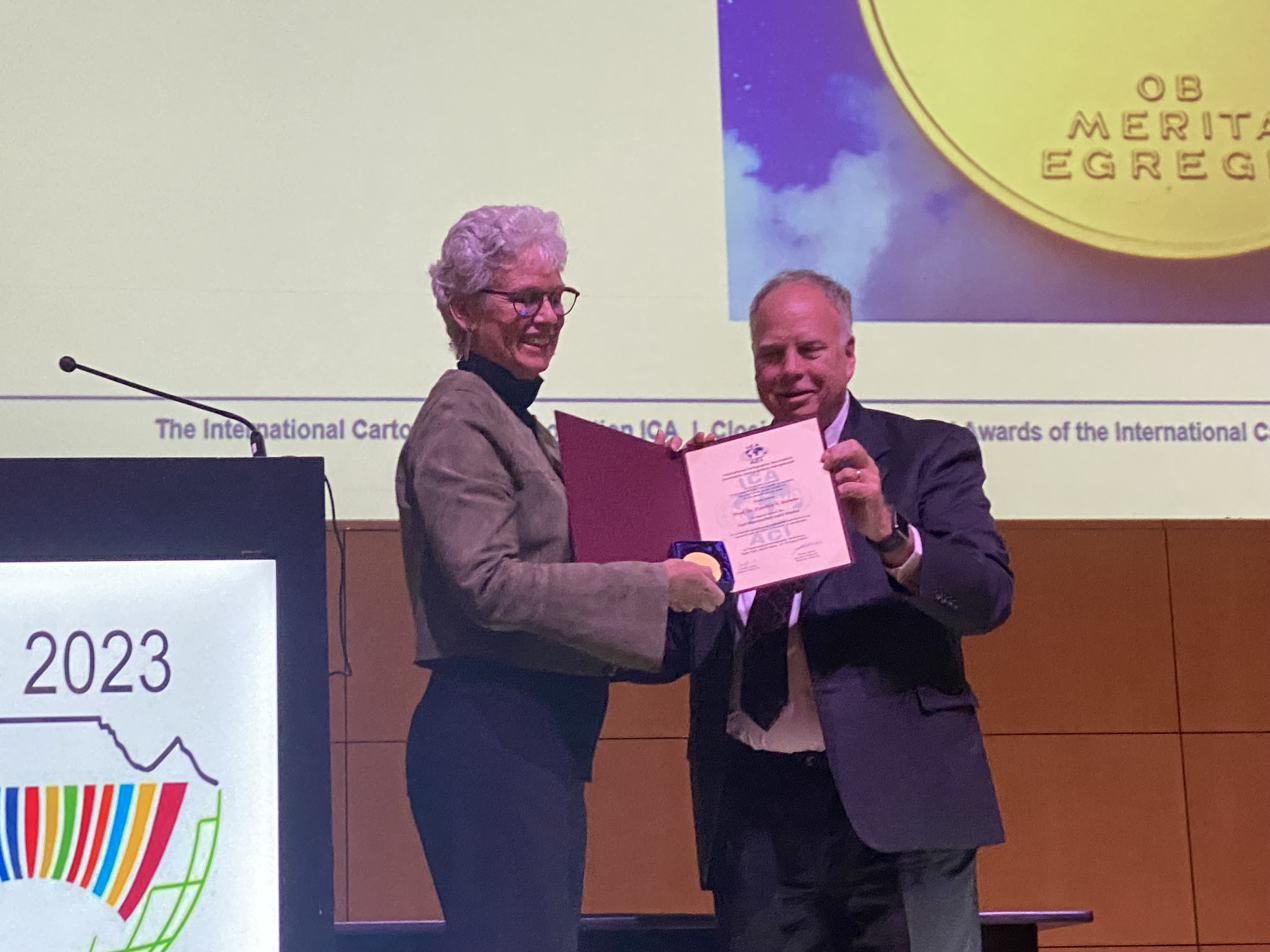
Cynthia Brewer receiving the ICA Carl Mannerfelt Gold Medal from outgoing ICA President Tim Trainor at the International Cartographic Conference.

ColorBrewer is an online tool for selecting map color schemes based on palettes created by Cynthia Brewer. It was launched in 2002 by Brewer, Mark Harrower, and The Pennsylvania State University. Suggested color schemes are based on data type (sequential, diverging, or qualitative). It also provides options for varied display environments, such as laptop, photocopy, and LCD projector, and colorblind safe options.

ColorBrewer is licensed using Apache 2.0 software license, which is similar to CC-BY-SA 3.0.

== Brewer palettes ==
Valid names and a full color representation for each palette are shown below. If this is viewed in a compliant browser, moving the mouse cursor over each box will pop up the corresponding color number as a tooltip.

Sequential (1-9)
- YlGn
- YlGnBu
- GnBu
- BuGn
- PuBuGn
- PuBu
- BuPu
- RdPu
- PuRd
- OrRd
- YlOrRd
- YlOrBr
- Purples
- Blues
- Greens
- Oranges
- Reds
- Greys

Divergent (1-11)
- PuOr
- BrBG
- PRGn
- PiYG
- RdBu
- RdGy
- RdYlBu
- Spectral
- RdYlGn

Qualitative (1-8/12)
- Accent
- Dark2
- Paired
- Pastel1
- Pastel2
- Set1
- Set2
- Set3

== Applications ==
Palette chosen by climatologist Ed Hawkins in his warming stripes graphics for portraying global warming

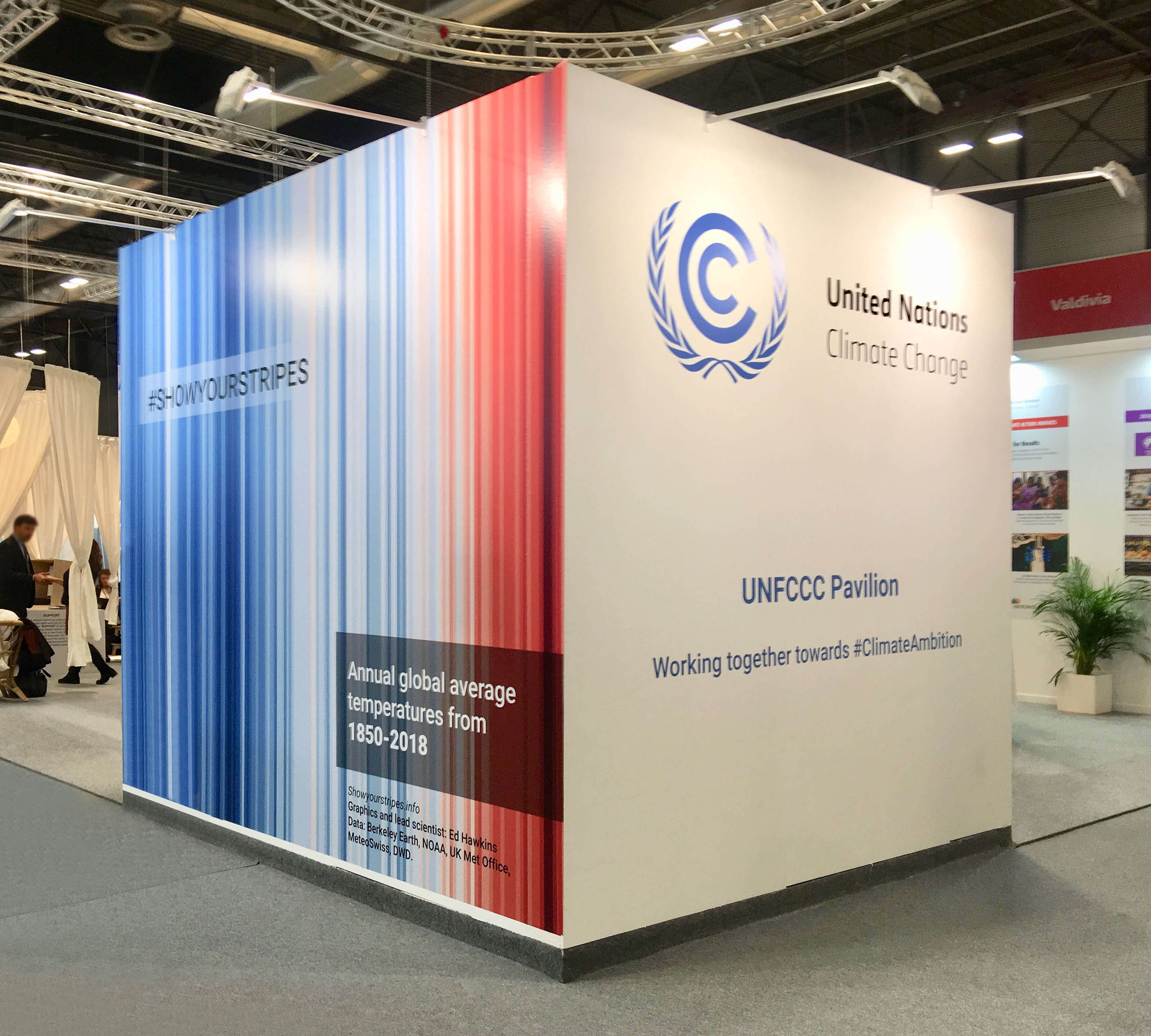
Example of a display with warming stripes, at a climate conference

In 2018, climate scientist Ed Hawkins chose the eight most saturated blues and reds from the ColorBrewer 9-class single-hue palettes in his design of warming stripes graphics, which visually summarize global warming as an ordered sequence of stripes.

== See also ==
- Map coloring
- Choropleth map
- Chorochromatic map
