= Lucy Tammam =

British fashion designer

- Born: Poole, Dorset, UK
- Occupation: Fashion Designer
- Years active: 2006-present
- Known for: Sustainability
- Notable work: One Dress

Lucy Tammam is a British fashion designer working with haute couture techniques and fair trade practices. She is recognized as a pioneer in sustainable haute couture. Through her brand, TAMMAM, founded in 2006, she creates bespoke, high-end garments and accessories that prioritize environmental and social responsibility, with ethical production methods. Tammam is an outspoken activist for both environmental and human/women's rights. Tammam dedicates time to passing on her knowledge to the next generation; she is an educator at prestigious institutions including The London College of Fashion. TAMMAM is a member of the British Fashion Council and a London Fashion Week schedule designer.

== Early life and education ==
Born in Poole, Dorset, Tammam grew up in the English coastal town. She traces her passion for sustainability back to an early dedication to activist causes. A vegetarian from childhood, Tammam was inspired by the British eco-warrior, Swampy, to join public protests and support human and animal rights. Tammam moved to London in 2000 to study fashion design with marketing at Central Saint Martins.

== Career ==
After graduating from Central Saint Martins, Tammam found that no existing fashion houses aligned with her values. This inspired her to launch her own label, Atelier TAMMAM, in 2007. Tammam's work emphasizes a "fiber-to-finish" philosophy, ensuring ethical sourcing and production at every stage. She personally inspects the locations where her eco-friendly cotton and silk are grown and processed. Tammam innovates her own fabrics based on organic cotton and Peace Silk (produced without harming silkworms).

Instead of adhering to the fast-fashion model of multiple collections per year, Tammam focuses on an annual collection combining new inspirations with updated styles from her archive. Her designs showcase both innovative techniques and traditional craftsmanship that promotes sustainability.

To provide supply chain transparency, the TAMMAM label was an early adopter of Digital Product Passports (DPP).

== One Dress activism ==
Tammam conceived the "One Dress" project in 2016 as a response to disposable fashion and the fast pace of London Fashion Week. The concept was for TAMMAM to produce just one dress instead of an entire collection. The project began with "One Dress: WOMEN," a collaborative couture gown embroidered with words symbolizing feminism and strength, contributed by individuals worldwide. A range of artisans globally contributed to the dress's design and construction, incorporating recycled materials and traditional sewing techniques. The project not only celebrated historical achievements in women's rights but also highlighted ongoing issues related to sustainability and craftsmanship in the fashion industry. The completed dress was showcased in various exhibitions and events throughout the UK, serving as a catalyst for discussions on these topics.

"One Dress: PLANET", which launched on 15 February 2025 at the Royal Geographical Society, merges haute couture with environmental activism in partnership with Stop Ecocide International. The gown is made from sustainable materials like organic cotton and Tencel and embroidered with flora from endangered ecosystems by artisans from diverse backgrounds. Participants can sponsor embroidery segments.

== Climate stripes and climate change activism ==
Tammam has collaborated with the University of Reading to create an eco-friendly fashion line inspired by Professor Ed Hawkins' "warming stripes" graphic, which illustrates the rise in global temperatures since 1850. This collection, showcased at London Fashion Week in September 2021, featured garments made from sustainable materials such as hand-loomed organic cottons, peace silks, and repurposed vintage fabrics. In April 2022, the TAMMAM x University of Reading partnership received the Best Customer Engagement Campaign award at the Drapers Sustainable Fashion Awards, recognizing its success in promoting climate change awareness through fashion.

In November 2023, Tammam launched the "ESA x Tammam" collection, featuring scarves inspired by European Space Agency's satellite imagery of Earth. The scarves are crafted in TAMMAM's signature cruelty-free Peace Silk, and are printed using organic-certified dyes, making them fully compostable. This partnership aims to blend couture with activism, encouraging conversations on climate issues through fashion.

== Philosophy and advocacy ==
Tammam believes that couture is a perfect model for sustainability due to its low-volume production, hand craftsmanship, and high-quality materials. She advocates for transparency in the fashion industry and supports artisans and sustainable suppliers by offering consultancy and introduction services to other designers. She also has a clear ethical policy, which she updates to reflect new ideas and current understandings. TAMMAM aims to offer fashion as an emotion or experience, instead of needless products, aiming to create a fashion brand based on the doughnut economics model.

== Accolades ==
- 2025 Winnder P.E.A. Awards Evolution of Sustainability Award for One Dress: PLANET
- 2022 Winner Drapers Best Engagement Campaign Award
- 2013 On behalf of the TAMMAM, Lucy Tammam received a Future 50 Award for demonstrating outstanding entrepreneurial flair and innovation in their pursuit to improve the economy, environment and society (awarded by Striding Out)
