= Zero Hour (2004 TV series) =

2004–2006 documentary TV series

- Genre: Documentary, docudrama
- Countries of origin: Canada; United Kingdom
- Original language: English
- No. of seasons: 3
- No. of episodes: 16

Production
- Running time: 45–50 minutes
- Production company: Cineflix Productions

Original release
- Network: History Television
- Release: 2004 – 2006

Zero Hour is a documentary-style television series. It aired on History Channel in the United States, on History Television in Canada and on the BBC in the United Kingdom. Zero Hour has also aired on Channel Seven in Australia (the third series aired on Network Ten from 1 May 2010 and now plays on 7mate); on Discovery Channel in Africa, Asia, New Zealand, Brazil, and the Netherlands. The program retells man-made disasters which unfolded in less than an hour.

Three narrators were used over the three seasons, David Morrissey, Paul McGann and Sean Pertwee.

Certain episodes have been partially censored for particular broadcasts. One example is the Columbine High School massacre episode (Season 1, Episode 3), which had some scenes cut (for intense violence, profanity, and racist slurs) when broadcast on Discovery Channel.

From 1 September 2014 to 1 March 2016, all episodes were available for streaming on Netflix. They can still be viewed on Amazon Video.

In 2008, a DVD box set containing 10 episodes was released by Discovery Channel and Go Entertain. The DVDs were also released separately. The episodes included were: "Disaster at Chernobyl", "Massacre at Columbine High" (cut version), "Terror in Tokyo & The Bali Bombing", "The Capture of Saddam Hussein", "The King of Cocaine", "The Sinking of the Estonia", "The Columbia Space Shuttle Disaster", "A Royal Massacre", and "SAS Mission Impossible". "The Last Hour of Flight 11" and "Shoot-out in Marseilles" (though titled differently as "Marseilles Plane Hijack") were released on a separately on DVD. The other episodes have not been released on DVD.

== Episodes ==
=== Season 1 (2004) ===
No. in season	Title	Disaster	Hour
1	"Disaster at Chernobyl"	Chernobyl disaster	26 April 1986; 00:23 – 01:23
On 26 April 1986, a power plant in Chernobyl exploded with devastating consequences. It is estimated that there were a total of 4,000 deaths worldwide and led hundreds of thousands to flee the cities of Pripyat and Chernobyl. This episode was filmed on location in Chernobyl at the surviving areas of the power plant.
2	"The Last Hour of Flight 11"	American Airlines Flight 11	11 September 2001; 07:46 – 08:46
On the morning of 11 September 2001, five Islamist extremists led by Mohamed Atta hijack the Los Angeles-bound American Airlines Flight 11 and deliberately fly it into the North Tower of the World Trade Center in New York City, as part of the September 11 attacks, taking thousands of lives and striking American soil in tragedy.
3	"Massacre at Columbine High"	Columbine High School massacre	20 April 1999; 11:19 a.m. – 12:08 p.m.
On 20 April 1999, high school senior students Eric Harris and Dylan Klebold opened fire at Columbine High School in Columbine, Colorado. Killing 13 (Note: Anne Marie Hochhalter, who was one of the wounded students, died from her injuries in 2025.) students and one teacher, as well as injuring 23 other students (20 by direct gunfire), before committing suicide in the library. The incident made international news, and has since spawned many copycat incidents. Two versions of the episode exist. The censored version (with a few scenes cut) is aired on television as well as the "explicit cut", which is also available to be streamed on Amazon Video.
4	"Terror in Tokyo"	Tokyo subway sarin attack	20 March 1995; 07:46 – 08:46
On 20 March 1995, the Tokyo Metro was attacked with the highly dangerous chemical weapon sarin, which was planted by five members of a terrorist group called Aum Shinrikyo. A total of thirteen people were killed and around 1,050 others were non-fatally affected, in an attack that the terrorists made to fulfil a task that given to them by their Master.

=== Season 2 (2005) ===
No. in season	Title	Disaster	Hour	Air Date
1	"The Bali Bombing"	2002 Bali bombings	12 October 2002; 22:10 – 23:10	12 October 2005
On 12 October 2002, terrorists planted two bombs in two nightclubs in Bali, Indonesia. There were 202 deaths and 209 people were injured, some of them seriously. Days before the episode aired, the tragedy repeated itself again.
2	"One of America's Own"	Oklahoma City bombing	19 April 1995; 08:02 – 09:02	23 January 2006
On 19 April 1995, 168 were killed when Timothy McVeigh bombed the Alfred P. Murrah Federal Building children, Men, Women, and, Government officials were killed under the hands of a Gulf War Vet.
3	"The Sinking of the Estonia"	MS Estonia sinking	28 September 1994; 00:48 – 01:48	2006
On 28 September 1994, the ship MS Estonia, already listing from poor cargo management, loses its bow visor while sailing through a storm on the Baltic Sea en route to Stockholm, rapidly flooding and sinking rapidly into the depths of the ocean. 852 people were killed and some were seriously injured but survived.
4	"The King of Cocaine"	Death of Pablo Escobar	2 December 1993; 13:59 – 14:59	2006
On 2 December 1993, Colombian drug lord and terrorist Pablo Escobar and his assistant were captured and killed by the Search Bloc forces in Colombia while trying to escape from the roof. NOTE: Also released on online streaming as "Killing the Cocaine King"
5	"Capturing Saddam"	Operation Red Dawn	13 December 2003; 19:26 – 20:26	14 February 2006
On 13 December 2003, Saddam Hussein, the 5th president of Iraq, was captured by U.S. special forces. In December 2006, he was executed by hanging and buried in a tomb that would soon be destroyed.
6	"The Plot to Kill The Pope"	Pope John Paul II assassination attempt	13 May 1981; 16:17 – 17:17	2006
On 13 May 1981, Turkish nationalist Mehmet Ali Ağca nearly assassinated Pope John Paul II. The Pope survived, losing 3 litres of blood and would live until his death in 2005.

=== Season 3 (2006) ===
No. in season	Title	Disaster	Hour
1	"SAS Mission Impossible"	Operation Barras	10 September 2000; 06:00 – 07:00
On 10 September 2000, the West Side Boys held members of the Royal Irish Regiment hostage. In the following rescue attempt, an estimated 56 people were killed, 12 wounded, and 18 WSBs captured.
2	"Falling Star – Columbia"	Space Shuttle Columbia disaster	1 February 2003; 08:00 – 09:00
On 1 February 2003, the U.S. Space Shuttle Columbia disintegrated over Texas and Louisiana during re-entry into the Earth's atmosphere, resulting in the death of all seven crew members and the loss of the oldest Space Shuttle, along with the retirement of the shuttle program
3	"A Royal Massacre – Nepal"	Nepalese royal massacre	1 June 2001; 19:57 – 20:57
On 1 June 2001, Crown Prince Dipendra Bir Bikram Shah killed 9 people and injured 5 others at a house in the grounds of the Narayanhity Royal Palace, before shooting himself and dying three days later on 4 June 2001, all to get revenge on his family for disapproving the marriage of him and his girlfriend.
4	"Hostage Rescue in Lima"	Japanese embassy hostage crisis	22 April 1997; 14:25 – 15:25
On 22 April 1997, hundreds of high-level diplomats, government and military officials and business executives were freed from the grasp of 14 members of the Túpac Amaru Revolutionary Movement (MRTA) during a raid on the Japanese embassy in Lima by Peruvian Armed Forces commandos, during which one hostage, two commandos, and all the MRTA militants died.
5	"The North Hollywood Shootout"	North Hollywood shootout	28 February 1997; 08:58 – 09:58
On 28 February 1997, two heavily armed bank robbers, Larry Eugene Phillips, Jr. and Emil Decebal Mătăsăreanu, engaged over 300 LAPD officers in a shootout in North Hollywood, Los Angeles with AK-47 type rifles and automatic weapons. Both robbers were killed, eleven police officers and seven civilians were injured, and numerous vehicles and other property were damaged or destroyed by the nearly 2,000 rounds of ammunition fired by the robbers and the police.
6	"Shoot-Out in Marseilles"	Air France Flight 8969	26 December 1994; 16:20 – 17:20
On 26 December 1994, members of the Armed Islamic Group (GIA) hijacked Air France Flight 8969 in Algiers, in an attempt to destroy the Eiffel Tower. When the aircraft reached Marseille, the GIGN, an intervention group of the French Gendarmerie, stormed the plane and killed all four hijackers. 3 passengers had been killed by the hijackers in Algiers, and 25 others were wounded during the rescue.

== See also ==
- Mayday (also known as Air Crash Investigation or Air Emergency)
- Seconds from Disaster
- Seismic Seconds
- Blueprint for Disaster
- Trapped
- Critical Situation (also known as Situation Critical)
- Days That Shook the World (a similar British documentary series in which historical events are dramatically reconstructed)
- Crimes That Shook Britain
