= GAMCO Educational Software =

American software developer

GAMCO Educational Software was an American educational video game developer located in Texas. From 1995 it a wholly owned subsidiary of Siboney Learning Group, a division of Siboney Corporation.

== History ==
Siboney was founded as Siboney-Caribbean Petroleum in 1955 by Jerry Tegeler. After the 1960s, the company evolved into the industries of coal properties, plastics production and domestic oil exploration. In 1968, Siboney purchased Gamco Inc., a company that manufactured and sold educational products. In 1992, Siboney granted options to purchase 175,000 shares to employees of Gamco Industries. In 1995, Jerry's son Tim took control of the company and sold off all the operating divisions except Gamco, a small educational systems company in west Texas. Bodie Marx, then working for a French trade publisher, was brought in to take over software operations via Siboney Learning division. By this point, Gamco had released 17 titles, the most popular one being Touchdown Maths.

Touchdown Maths had been developed after "tests revealed that both girls and boys enjoy learning math in connection with the game of football." The series sees pairs of students compete in maths problems, the winner gaining yardage on the field. The series was released on Mac Color Classic, LC Series, Roman Numeral II series and Proforma 400 and 600 series. Touchdown Maths had recently been accused of being societally and technologically outdated; "too boy-oriented", and only running on Apple II and MS-DOS systems. Marx paid a Ukrainian software developer $350,000 update the games to run on Windows and Mac computers; meanwhile he tasked Siboney software staff of 8 programmers to create more titles. They debuted in October 1997.

Of Gamco's total sales for the quarter ended March 31, 1997, approximately 94% was generated by proprietary software. In 1997, Siboney Learning Group launched Orchard: Teacher's Choice Software, which offered schools a curriculum-based solution with universal management by tracks student scores on all Siboney programs; this included Gamco products. Gamco dealers' sales grew 14.4% in 1998. Gamco had ann "on approval" policy where products shipped subject to customer approval were not billed for and could. be returned within 45 days. Gamco's R&D budget was $403,000, $440,000 and $412,000 in 1998, 1997 and 1996.

As of 2001, Siboney employed around 60 people at its Kirkwood headquarters, Hanley Industrial Court fulfillment center and other offices throughout the United States. In 2005, sales of GAMCO and Teacher Support Software decreased 33% compared to 2004. In 2009, Siboney signed a latter of intent to sell Siboney Learning Group to an affiliate of educational software company EdOptions.

== Series ==
=== Maths ===
- Math Concepts One... Two... Three!
- Math Concepts in Motion
- Math Concepts Step-by-Step
- Skillbuilders
- Paws and Pyramids
- Word Problem Square Off Series
- Touchdown Math Series
- Number Facts Series
- Money Challenge/Discover Time

=== Reading ===
- Phonics
- Reading Concepts
- Reading for Critical Thinking
- Captain Zog's Main Idea
- Undersea Reading for Meaning
- Verdict: A Game of Fact or Opinion

=== Language Arts ===
- Renegades
- Essential Language Series

=== Writing ===
- Paragraph Power & Responsive Writing
- Precision Writing
- Writing Renegades
