= MV Rocknes =

Two motor ships have borne the name Rocknes:

- MV Rocknes (1975) is a 3,645-ton bulk carrier launched on 1 November 1975, by Appledore Shipbuilders, in Appledore, North Devon, United Kingdom. Sold in 2002, renamed several times, in 2011 as Ali-K.
- MV Rocknes (2001) is a 9,000-ton bulk carrier ship launched in 2001, shipwrecked in 2004, salvaged and renamed Nordnes.
