= Humberto Vidal explosion =

Explosion in Río Piedras, Puerto Rico in 1996

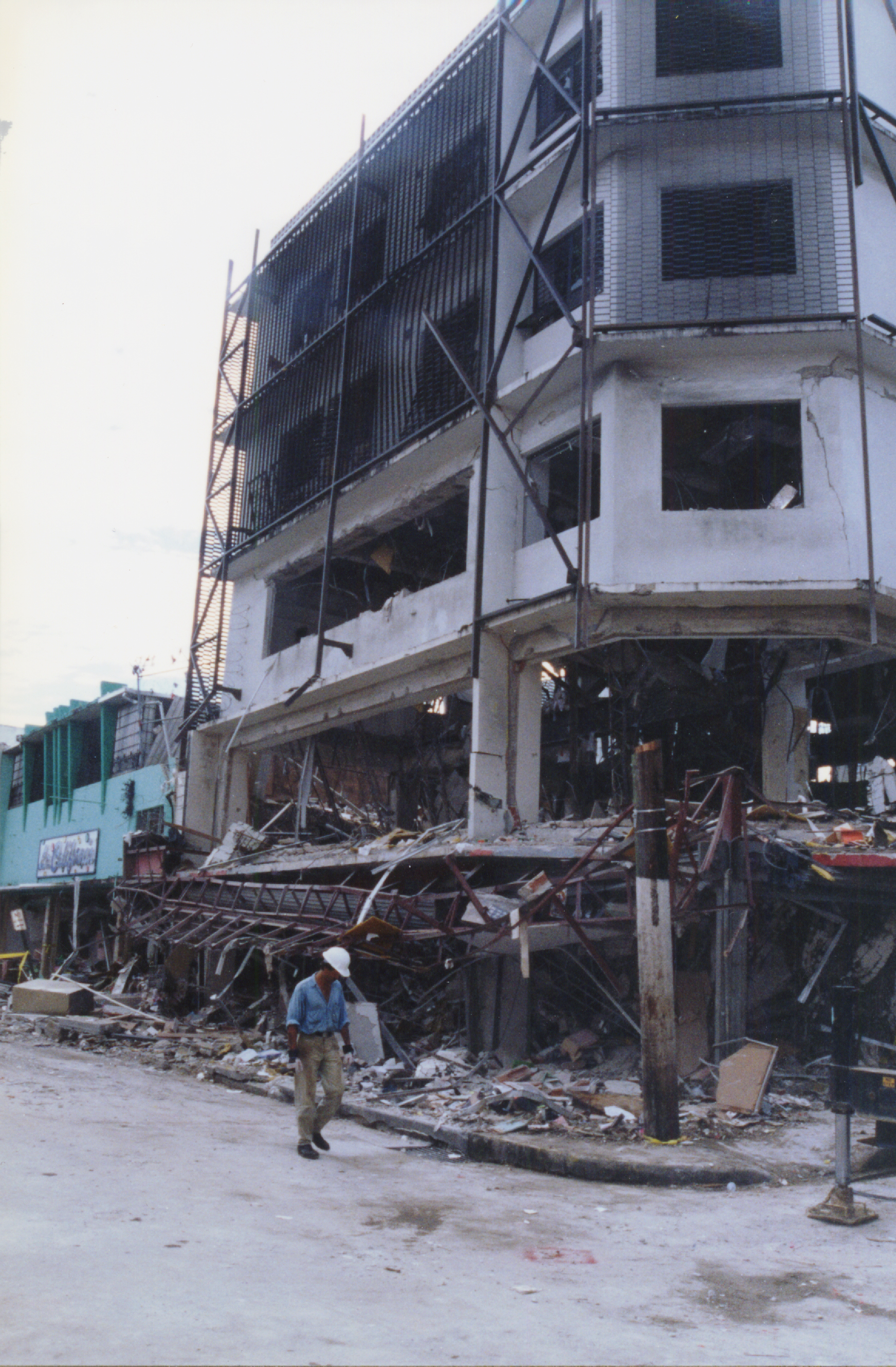
- A view of the destroyed building.
- Date: November 21, 1996; 30 years ago
- Time: 8:35 a.m.
- Location: Humberto Vidal store Río Piedras, Puerto Rico; 18.3984°N 66.0493°W
- Also known as: Río Piedras explosion
- Cause: Gas leak
- Deaths: 33
- Injuries: 69
- Property damage: Several adjacent businesses and properties severely damaged or destroyed
- Verdict: Explosion caused by failure of San Juan Gas Company, Inc., (1) to oversee its employees' actions to ensure timely identification and correction of unsafe conditions and strict adherence to operating practices and (2) to provide adequate training to employees

The Humberto Vidal explosion (sometimes also referred to as the Río Piedras explosion) was a gas explosion that occurred on November 21, 1996 at the Humberto Vidal shoe store in Río Piedras, Puerto Rico. The explosion killed 33 and wounded 69 others. It is the deadliest disaster to occur in Puerto Rico.

== Disaster ==
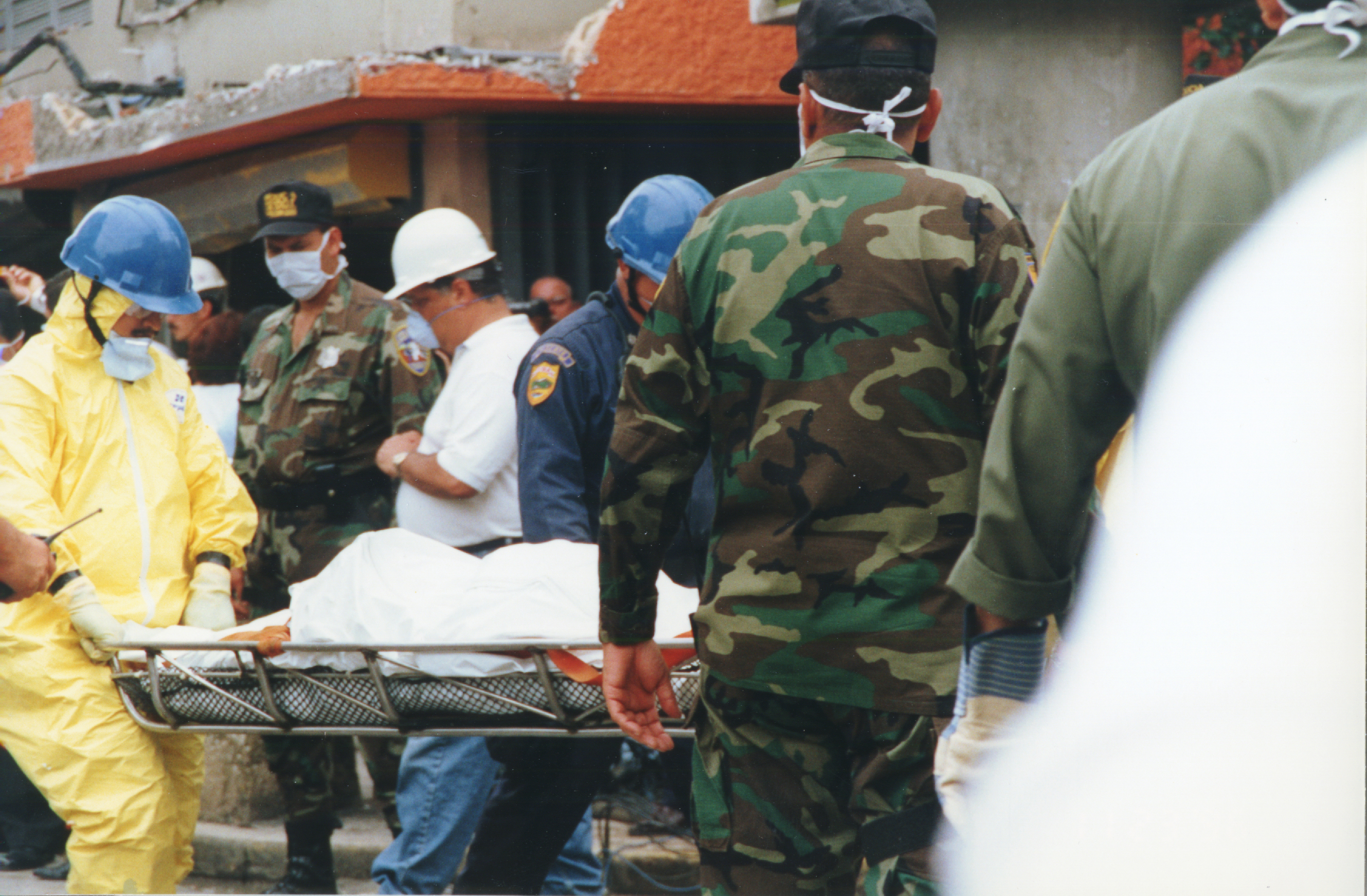
A survivor is carried out after being rescued from the rubble.

The explosion occurred in the middle of a bustling commercial sector of Río Piedras. This area of the city at the time was particularly busy, filled with shoppers doing their holiday shopping. A week prior to the explosion, Sara Ruiz, the owner of the department store adjacent to the Humberto Vidal building noticed a strange smell lingering in the store. A week later, the owner of the Humberto Vidal shoe store, Arturo O'Neill, also smelled the same smell of gas. The company's human resources manager Milagros Saavedra, who had dreams of becoming a pastry chef, arrived for work and also detected a strange odor. Arturo asked her to go to the basement to check the source of the smell, but she refused. Desperate, Arturo phoned the gas company. Once they arrived, the technician, Luis Marquez used a "gas sniffer" to detect any built-up gas in the basement. However, the device could not detect any gas and Marquez reassured Arturo that the smell was just the odor emanating from the shoes stored in the basement. Skeptical of Luis' advice, Arturo phoned the gas company a second time. This time, they drilled holes into the ground and stuck rods down into the area where the gas was present. However, this method also failed to detect any gas and Arturo eventually decided to open the store to the public, despite his concerns about the smell. Hours later, Maritza Ramos arrived with her two daughters to shop for new shoes. The six-story building consisted of a basement that stored extra shoes (the only store in the area that used the basement for this purpose), the Humberto Vidal shoe store, a jewelry store, a music record store on the first floor and the company head offices on the 3rd, 4th and 5th floors. The 2nd floor was empty and not used. The force of the blast caused the upper floors to collapse down onto one another, crushing occupants beneath it, killing many of them. Shards of glass and debris flew through the windows of a Roman Catholic parochial school across the street. The store was later demolished.

The initial theory was that the explosion was caused by a bomb planted by clandestine paramilitaries or even arson due to San Juan being notorious for crime and terrorist activity, with the crime rate twice that of New York City, and due to previous deliberate acts, including the destruction of 5 government aircraft by the insurgency group Macheteros ("Cane Cutters"), notorious throughout all of Puerto Rico. However, there was no trace of explosives, nor was there any evidence that the building was set ablaze by arsonists.

United States President Bill Clinton declared Puerto Rico a disaster area, which ensured the receipt of federal aid to help the victims, including the assistance of the National Transportation Safety Board (NTSB), which launched an investigation. San Juan Gas Company, owned by Enron Corporation, denied any responsibility, claiming that the building had no gas service at the time of the explosion.

== Casualties ==
The explosion killed 33 victims and wounded 69 others. Most of the victims were inside the building in the shoe store and the corporate offices above. Many pedestrians walking near the building when it exploded were killed or injured by the force of the blast and flying debris. Among the victims was Jorge Ivanez Sr., the father of Jorge Ivanez Sr., who worked as a father-son air conditioning maintenance team. Ivanez Sr. had gone to the basement at an unknown time to check on the air conditioning unit, shortly after his son finished his shift and was meeting his boss for lunch downstairs. During the inspection, he inadvertently flicked a switch on the air-conditioning unit, which caused a spark to generate near the basement thermostat, igniting the accumulated propane gas, killing him instantly. In addition, the sister of Janet Ramos, Maritzia, was also killed, leaving behind her 2 daughters. Store manager Arturo O'Neill's body was found amongst the rubble of the collapsed building. 5 employees from the company offices were killed, and 7 more were injured, including Malegra Saavedra, who had fallen several floors when the building collapsed. After the explosion, bodies of victims were placed on the pavement in front of the nearby La Milagrosa church, where Cardinal Luis Aponte Martínez administered last rites. San Juan Police Chief Pedro Toledo witnessed the chaos and carnage of the immediate aftermath of the explosion, stating, "There were just parts of bodies lying in the street, torsos, bones, cars blasted against the building". The Colegio de La Milagrosa across the street had students outside for an outdoor class. Several students were knocked to the ground by the force of the blast, but none of the students were injured or killed in the explosion.

== Investigation ==
The NTSB's investigation revealed that a nearby propane gas line adjacent to the Humberto Vidal Store had been improperly constructed years earlier, with the gas line becoming bent when a water main was installed beneath it. This caused cracks in the pipe, allowing propane gas to seep out through the soil into the basement, accumulating near the floor (due to propane being more dense than air). Investigators discovered that holes drilled by the gas company that were used to detect gas below ground were only 46 centimetres (18 in) deep, not nearly deep enough to detect the propane gas which was approximately 120 centimetres (47 in) below street level. Poor training was the cause of the gas company team's failure to detect any propane gas. In addition, Luis Marquez, the gas technician who first went to the basement with the gas sniffer had turned the device on inside the building instead of outdoors in fresh air as required, resulting in the sniffer unable to detect any gas.

The San Juan Gas Company vehemently denied responsibility, stating that the explosion was caused by methane gas from the sewer lines. However, NTSB investigator Charles Batten refuted this claim, stating that methane gas being lighter than air would have settled near the ceiling and if ignited, would have caused the shoes to be thrown downward instead of up, further reinforcing that propane gas was the cause of the explosion. In addition, photos taken right after the explosion showed a support beam being bent upward and black marks made from the stored shoes higher up on the shelves near the ceiling further supported the fact that propane gas was the cause. Propane gas, being more dense than air, would have settled at the bottom of the basement and would have thrown shoes upward when ignited.

== Aftermath ==
The San Juan Gas Company was sued by the victims' families and owners of the businesses affected. There were a total of 1,500 lawsuits presented. Despite this, the company continuously admitted no wrongdoing. Of all the lawsuits, 725 were settled out of court, while 101 were ruled against the company. The remaining lawsuits were settled in 2002 for $28 million. There was also criticism of the company's training practices, which management promised to rectify.

According to a city resolution, all underground gas lines in Río Piedras were removed to avoid further tragedies. The area of the explosion now has a mural in remembrance of those who died.

== Dramatizations ==
The disaster was examined in the 13th episode of the second season of the documentary series Seconds From Disaster, titled "Puerto Rico Gas Explosion", on the National Geographic Channel, aired on December 13, 2005, and the Canadian documentary television series Blueprint for Disaster.

== See also ==
- List of explosions
- Dupont Plaza Hotel arson, a New Year's Eve fire in Puerto Rico
- 2009 Cataño oil refinery fire, an oil refinery explosion and fire in Puerto Rico
- Morris J. Berman oil spill, an oil spill on the north coast of Puerto Rico
