= List of Seconds from Disaster episodes =

The National Geographic documentary programme Seconds from Disaster investigates historically relevant man-made and natural disasters from the 20th century. Each episode aims to explain a single incident by analyzing the causes and circumstances that ultimately affected the disaster. The program uses re-enactments, interviews, testimonies, and CGI to analyze the sequence of events second-by-second for the audience. National Geographic has broadcast many of the programme's episodes under multiple titles. The title currently or most recently listed on the NGC Calendar is shown first. Alternate titles are shown in parentheses.

== Series overview ==
Season	Episodes	Originally released	
Season	Episodes	First released	Last released
1	13	July 6, 2004	October 26, 2004
2	19	June 28, 2005	July 11, 2006
3	13	July 25, 2006	March 7, 2007
4	6	September 5, 2011	October 10, 2011
5	6	March 11, 2012	April 22, 2012
6	10	July 22, 2012	December 29, 2012
7	2	February 15, 2018	February 22, 2018

== Season 1 (2004) ==
No. overall	No. in season	Title	Disaster	Date of disaster	Nature of disaster	Original release date
1	1	"Concorde" ("Crash of the Concorde")	Air France Flight 4590	July 25, 2000	Aircraft crash	July 6, 2004
On July 25, 2000 a Concorde supersonic jet operating as Air France Flight 4590 takes off from Charles de Gaulle Airport. A piece of metal from a McDonnell-Douglas DC-10 that fell onto the runway impales the Concorde's tire, which explodes. Debris is flung into the wing, causing a fire and the Concorde's crash into a hotel in Gonesse, killing the 100 passengers and nine crew members on board, as well as four others in the hotel.
2	2	"Tunnel Inferno"	Mont Blanc Tunnel fire	March 24, 1999	Vehicle fire	July 13, 2004
A truck carrying margarine and flour catches fire in the Mont Blanc Tunnel, which connects France and Italy under Mont Blanc; 39 people are killed in the inferno.
3	3	"Oklahoma City" ("The Bomb in Oklahoma")	Oklahoma City bombing	April 19, 1995	Terrorist attack (bombing)	July 20, 2004
In retaliation against the U.S. government, whom Timothy McVeigh blames for the Waco siege two years earlier, McVeigh parks a truck carrying a bomb in front of the Alfred P. Murrah Federal Building in Oklahoma City. Minutes later it explodes, destroying the building and killing 168 people.
4	4	"Fire on the Star" ("Fire Onboard the Star")	M/S Scandinavian Star Fire	April 7, 1990	Ship fire	July 27, 2004
An arsonist sets a fire on Deck 3 of the Frederikshavn, Denmark-bound M/S Scandinavian Star, loaded with passengers and cars at Oslo, Norway. 158 people on board die from smoke inhalation and another person dies in hospital from his injuries, bringing the total of deaths to 159.
5	5	"Derailment at Eschede" ("High Speed Train Wreck")	Eschede train disaster	June 3, 1998	Train derailment	August 3, 2004
A wheel of the ICE 1 No. 884 'Wilhelm Konrad Röntgen' high speed train fails during travel in Eschede, Germany. The train derails and strikes a bridge, killing 101 people and injuring 105.
6	6	"Wreck of the Sunset Limited" ("The Wreck of the Sunset Limited")	Big Bayou Canot rail accident	September 22, 1993	Train derailment	August 10, 2004
After one of a string of barges hit a support of a bridge in Big Bayou Canot near Mobile, Alabama, the Sunset Limited (an Amtrak train) derails as it crosses the bridge, resulting in its collapse and the deaths of 47 people.
7	7	"Meltdown in Chernobyl"	Chernobyl disaster	April 26, 1986	Nuclear disaster	August 17, 2004
An explosion at the Chernobyl Nuclear Power Plant kills 56 people, threatens the health of thousands more and causes a major environmental disaster.
8	8	"Inferno in Guadalajara"	Guadalajara petrol explosions	April 22, 1992	Subterranean explosions	August 24, 2004
Days after residents of Guadalajara, Mexico complained of a foul smell, a series of gasoline-fueled explosions in the sewers kills 206 people. An investigation finds that the accident was caused by an improperly-routed water pipe producing humidity that corroded a steel pipeline, allowing gasoline to seep into the sewer system.
9	9	"Fire on the Ski Slope"	Kaprun disaster	November 11, 2000	Tunnel fire	August 31, 2004
A funicular train catches fire as it travels through a tunnel at the Kaprun Ski Resort, Austria, killing 155 people; 12 people survive, exiting the tunnel past the burning train.
10	10	"Explosion in the North Sea"	Piper Alpha disaster	July 6, 1988	Oil platform explosions	October 5, 2004
A series of explosions and fires on the Piper Alpha, an oil platform 110 miles off the coast of Scotland that had been converted to natural gas production, results in the deaths of 167 people and the collapse of the platform.: Note: Only episode with the opening narration being "sequence of critical events, locked in time".
11	11	"Flood at Stava Dam"	Collapse of Val di Stava dam	July 19, 1985	Dam collapse and consequent flood	October 12, 2004
Two dams above the village of Stava in northern Italy collapse, causing an ensuing mudslide and flood down the Stava River valley that kills 268 people in the village below.
12	12	"Collision on the Runway"	Tenerife airport disaster	March 27, 1977	Aircraft collision on runway	October 19, 2004
At Tenerife North Airport, in the Canary Islands, KLM Flight 4805, a Boeing 747 trying to take off through fog, strikes Pan Am Flight 1736, another Boeing 747 that was still on the runway. Both aircraft explode, killing 583 people.
13	13	"Pentagon 9/11"	American Airlines Flight 77	September 11, 2001	Aircraft hijacking and intentional crash into building	October 26, 2004
As the World Trade Center in New York City burns after being hit by two hijacked aircraft, another hijacked aircraft is deliberately flown into The Pentagon, killing all 64 people on board and 125 on the ground.: Note: Only episode with the opening narration being "don't just occur".

== Season 2 (2005–2006) ==
No. overall	No. in season	Title	Disaster	Date of disaster	Nature of disaster	Original release date
14	1	"Columbia's Last Flight" ("Space Shuttle Columbia")	Space Shuttle Columbia disaster	February 1, 2003	Space Shuttle disintegration	June 28, 2005
As the Space Shuttle Columbia lifts off from the Kennedy Space Center on a 16-day mission, a piece of insulating foam breaks off the external fuel tank and damages the left wing of the shuttle. As it enters the Earth's atmosphere during the return trip, Columbia disintegrates under the massive heat, killing all seven astronauts on board.
15	2	"Alpine Tsunami"	Galtür avalanche	February 23, 1999	Powder snow avalanche	July 5, 2005
At the Austrian alpine village of Galtür, snow on the mountains surrounding the village build up. Due to the changing temperature during the month, a strong but brittle layer of ice forms under the snow. On the day of the disaster, the ice layer collapses and the building ice bank slips down the slope and forms a powder avalanche. Two minutes later, it hits Galtur and buries 57 people in the snow, killing 31 of them. Note: The opening narration changed to "Unravel the fateful moments".
16	3	"Motorway Plane Crash" ("Freeway Plane Crash")	British Midland Flight 92	January 8, 1989	Aircraft crash	July 12, 2005
British Midland Flight 92, a two-month-old Boeing 737-400, takes-off from Heathrow Airport in London, heading for Belfast. While on route the aircraft's left engine suffers a fan blade failure. The crew shut down the wrong engine and start to prepare for an emergency landing at East Midlands Airport. On approach to the airport the damaged left engine fails completely and then catches fire. With insufficient thrust to maintain altitude, the plane crashes 900 metres from the runway on the M1 motorway embankment at Kegworth, killing 47 people, though miraculously, the plane managed to clear the motorway itself, preventing any further casualties on the ground. Note: The opening narration permanently changed to "Unravel the clues and count down" and used in subsequent episodes. Exceptions of the change are stated in the notes. This episode also looks briefly at the Bombing of Pan Am flight 103.
17	4	"Mount St Helens Eruption" ("Mount St. Helens Eruption")	1980 eruption of Mount St. Helens	May 18, 1980	Volcanic eruption, massive landslide, and volcanic lahars	July 26, 2005
Mount St. Helens in the countryside of Washington erupts for the first time in 123 years, killing 57 people. Note: Only episode with the opening narration being "Behind natural disasters are a chain of"
18	5	"Zeebrugge Ferry Disaster" ("Capsized in the North Sea")	Herald of Free Enterprise capsizing	March 6, 1987	Ship capsize	August 16, 2005
The British car ferry Herald of Free Enterprise departs the port of Zeebrugge in Belgium. The crew accidentally left the bow doors open and water enters the car deck, causing the ferry to capsize, taking the lives of 193 passengers and crew. Note: Only episode with the opening narration being "Unravel the decisions that triggered those".
19	6	"Kobe Earthquake" ("Killer Quake")	1995 earthquake in Kobe	January 17, 1995	Earthquake	August 30, 2005
The Japanese city of Kobe is rocked by the Great Hanshin earthquake, which destroys many of its buildings. Many traditional houses collapse due to the heavy roofs and weak walls. Soil liquefaction occurs at the coastal and port areas of Kobe. 6,434 people die in what is then Japan's worst peacetime disaster. Note: The opening narration is "Behind every disaster lies a chain of critical events that decides who lives and who dies".
20	7	"Crash Landing at Sioux City" ("Crash Landing in Sioux City")	United Airlines Flight 232	July 19, 1989	Aircraft crash	September 13, 2005
United Airlines Flight 232, a McDonnell Douglas DC-10 en route to Chicago from Denver, experiences a catastrophic failure of the titanium fan disk in its tail engine. The pilots try to land at Sioux City, Iowa. As the DC-10 descends it rolls right just above the ground. The DC-10 crashes and explodes into a fireball, killing 112 of the 296 people on board. 184 people survive the accident, in part thanks to a deadheading training-check and an airman named Dennis Edward Fitch who was able to provide assistance to the flight crew in controlling the DC-10.
21	8	"The Bali Bombing" ("Disco Bombing")	2002 Bali bombings	October 12, 2002	Terrorist attack (three bombings)	September 20, 2005
Bombers in Bali attempt to detonate bombs in three different places. The first, a suicide bomb, is detonated in a small nightclub across the road from another nightclub, the Sari Club. A second bomb, a truck filled with explosives parked outside the Sari Club explodes 15 seconds after the first. Less than a minute later, a third bomb detonates outside the United States Consulate. The total death toll is 202. Note: The opening narration is "Behind every disaster lies a chain of critical events that decides who lives and who dies. Unravel the fateful moments in those final".
22	9	"Hotel Collapse Singapore" ("Hotel Collapse")	Collapse of Hotel New World	March 15, 1986	Building collapse	September 27, 2005
Hotel New World, a one-star budget hotel located in Singapore's Little India district, collapses due to growing microcracks in the failing structural columns. The cracks were caused by a miscalculation of the building's structural load by the structural engineer. After a seven-day rescue operation, 17 people are saved, but 33 perish.
23	10	"TWA Flight 800" ("TWA 800")	TWA Flight 800	July 17, 1996	Aircraft crash	October 18, 2005
TWA Flight 800 leaves New York City for Paris 80 minutes late. Only 12 minutes into the flight, there are short circuits in electrical wires that cause ignition of vaporised jet fuel in the center fuel tank. The explosion causes the nose of the aircraft to break off. The aircraft continues to disintegrate as it plummets into the sea, killing all 230 on board.
24	11	"Paris Train Crash" ("Gare de Lyon") ("Runaway Train")	Gare de Lyon rail accident	June 27, 1988	Train collision on platform	November 1, 2005
A commuter train bound for Paris is forced to stop at Le Vert de Maisons (Paris RER) when a woman pulls the emergency brake after realising she was about to miss her stop. The crew reset the brake system so the train can resume its trip. Then the train arrives at the Gare de Lyon, it collides with another train parked at the station, killing 56 people. Note: This episode was originally named "Gare de Lyon" but was changed whilst aired on National Geographic.
25	12	"The Hindenburg" ("Hindenburg Air Ship")	Hindenburg disaster	May 6, 1937	Zeppelin crash	November 15, 2005
When the zeppelin LZ-129 Hindenburg catches fire at Lakehurst Naval Air Station for landing. The zeppelin explodes into an inferno and crashes, killing 35 of the 97 people on board and one ground crew member.
26	13	"Explosion In Puerto Rico" ("Puerto Rico Gas Explosion")	Humberto Vidal explosion	November 21, 1996	Subterranean explosion	December 13, 2005
For days, a foul smell hangs around in the Humberto Vidal shoe store in San Juan, Puerto Rico. The smell is caused by leaking propane gas coming from an unmapped pipe in the sloping road near the shoe store. The gas goes undetected due to faulty gas searching techniques. Then, an air conditioner with bad wiring is switched on, starting a spark that ignites the propane and the store explodes, claiming 33 lives. Note: The opening narration is "Behind every disaster lies a chain of critical events that decides who lives and who dies".
27	14	"Skywalk Collapse"	Hyatt Regency walkway collapse	July 17, 1981	Skywalk collapse	January 10, 2006
1,500 people gather for a dance in the Hyatt Regency Hotel in Kansas City. The second and 4th floor skywalks, hung from steel rods, fail. They collapse and crush 114 people to death.
28	15	"Amsterdam Air Crash" ("Plane Crash in the Suburbs")	El Al Flight 1862	October 4, 1992	Plane crash	March 28, 2006
El Al Flight 1862, a Boeing 747-200F cargo airliner, takes-off from Schiphol Airport near Amsterdam, when the engines on the right wing shear off. 8 minutes later, Flight 1862 glides into a high rise apartment building killing 43 people.
29	16	"Russia's Nuclear Sub Nightmare" ("Sinking of the Kursk")	Kursk submarine disaster	August 12, 2000	Submarine sinking	April 18, 2006
During a training mission, a torpedo on board the Kursk leaks hydrogen peroxide. It reacts with iron oxide (rust) in the bow and blasts the front of the submarine. Although the submarine has explosion-proof walls, the explosion spreads through the ventilation shafts, killing everyone at the command post and preventing the sub from performing an emergency blow. 135 seconds later, another explosion rocks the submarine. Then it sinks, killing all but 23 men on board. While the survivors wait to be rescued, special boards that produce breathing oxygen with potassium superoxide drop into the oily floor, starting a reaction that creates a fire, killing them as well. Note: The opening narration is "triggered by a chain of critical events".
30	17	"King's Cross Fire" ("London's Subway Inferno")	King's Cross fire	November 18, 1987	Subway station fire	May 19, 2006
On the night of 18 November 1987, a dropped match produced a small flame on a wooden escalator at the King's Cross tube (underground railway) station. Suddenly, the containable flame explodes rapidly into a fireball. It charges up the escalator and kills 31 people in the ticket hall 20m away. The inferno leaves investigators stumped. When the answer is revealed, it will shock everyone, adding a new chapter to the laws of fire dynamics. This effect is now called the trench effect.
31	18	"US Embassy Bombings" ("American Embassy Bombing") ("Nairobi Bombing")	1998 U.S. embassy bombings	August 7, 1998	Terrorist attack (two bombings)	June 27, 2006
In Dar-es-Salaam, Tanzania, and Nairobi, Kenya, truck bombs destroy the U.S. Embassy buildings killing 224 and injuring thousands. Osama bin Laden and al-Qaeda are held responsible for the attacks.
32	19	"Florida Swamp Air Crash" ("Everglades Plane Crash")	ValuJet Flight 592	May 11, 1996	Aircraft crash	July 11, 2006
ValuJet Flight 592, a McDonnell-Douglas DC-9 with 110 people on board, is bound for Atlanta, Georgia from Miami, Florida. Suddenly a fire starts in the cabin and cockpit, so large it consumed in flames and the crew are incapacitated by the smoke. The jet loses control and goes down in the Everglades, leaving no survivors. Note: The opening narration is "the result of a chain of".

== Season 3 (2006–2007) ==
No. overall	No. in season	Title	Disaster	Date of disaster	Nature of disaster	Original release date
33	1	"Titanic" ("Sinking of the Titanic")	Sinking of the RMS Titanic	April 14–15, 1912	Ship sinking	July 25, 2006
The RMS Titanic, on her maiden voyage from Southampton to New York City with over 2,000 people on board, strikes an iceberg. The rivets holding the hull together fail upon impact, allowing water to enter the first five compartments, one more than she can handle and remain afloat. Plus, it also happens that the ship is equipped with insufficient lifeboats. Within 2 hours and 40 minutes, she sinks, taking with her about 1,500 lives.
34	2	"Aircraft Carrier Explosion"	USS Forrestal fire	July 29, 1967	Aircraft carrier explosion	August 15, 2006
Fighter aircraft on the aircraft carrier USS Forrestal prepare to launch for a sortie over Vietnam. Suddenly a fighter jet explodes and a massive blast rocks the ship. Despite the crew efforts the fire spread to the below deck. The disaster kills 132 personnel with a further 161 wounded and 2 missing, presumed dead.
35	3	"Plane Crash in Queens"	American Airlines Flight 587	November 12, 2001	Aircraft crash	September 6, 2006
It's been more than two months after 9/11 and the event is still fresh in everyone's minds. American Airlines Flight 587, operated by an Airbus A300-600R, leaves John F. Kennedy Airport for Santo Domingo. Shortly after take-off, the aircraft spins out of control and crashes into Rockaway, Queens, killing all 260 people on board and five on the ground.
36	4	"Munich Olympic Massacre" ("Olympic Hostage Crisis")	Munich massacre	September 5–6, 1972	Terrorist attack (hostage taking)	September 13, 2006
During the Olympic Games in Munich, 11 Israeli athletes are held hostage by Palestinian terrorists. They supply a list of Palestinian prisoners whose release they demand in exchange for freeing the athletes. But at Fürstenfeldbruck Airport, a rescue attempt goes wrong, and by 12am the next day, 17 people are dead.
37	5	"Superstore Collapse" ("Department Store Collapse")	Sampoong Department Store collapse	June 29, 1995	Building collapse	September 20, 2006
Three air conditioning units on the roof of the five-story Sampoong Department Store in Seoul, South Korea are moved across the roof. Two years later, a column on the fifth floor fails causing the building to collapse. The store had been kept open, despite reservations about its safety, and 502 people in the store were killed. Note: The episode also take a brief look into the collapse of Seongsu Bridge.
38	6	"Plane Crash in the Potomac" ("Washington Air Crash")	Air Florida Flight 90	January 13, 1982	Aircraft crash	September 27, 2006
Air Florida Flight 90 leaves Washington National Airport for Miami with 79 passengers and crew on board. The Boeing 737-200 is delayed for hours due to undesirable weather, and only seconds after getting airborne it crashes into the 14th Street Bridge. It bounces off and slams into the icy Potomac River. Five people are rescued, but 78 lose their lives, four of them motorists on the bridge. Lenny Skutnik and Arland D. Williams Jr. emerges as the heroes of that fatal day.
39	7	"Asian Tsunami"	2004 Indian Ocean earthquake and tsunami	December 26, 2004	Earthquake and consequent tsunami	October 25, 2006
The second largest earthquake in 40 years, with a magnitude of 9.3, strikes the town of Banda Aceh, Indonesia. Shortly after, it unleashes a tsunami, which takes nearly 230,000 lives around the coasts of the entire Indian Ocean.
40	8	"Comet Air Crash" ("Crash of the Comet")	BOAC Flight 781 and South African Airways Flight 201	BOAC 781: January 10, 1954; SAA 201: April 8, 1954	Two aircraft crashes	November 15, 2006
A de Havilland DH.106 Comet 1, the world's first passenger jet airliner, takes off from Rome but explodes over the Tyrrhenian Sea 26 minutes into the flight, killing all 35 people on board. The investigation begins but three months later, another Comet crashes evidently in the same manner taking another 21 lives. All Comets are grounded and the investigation takes a step forward. The investigation results in improved metallurgical understanding, from which all aircraft design greatly benefits, even over five decades after the incidents. Note: This episode mainly focuses on BOAC Flight 781, the first to crash.
41	9	"Chicago Air Crash" ("Flight Engine Down")	American Airlines Flight 191	May 25, 1979	Aircraft crash	November 29, 2006
American Airlines Flight 191, a McDonnell-Douglas DC-10, takes-off from Chicago's O'Hare Airport. But when the engine falls off, the plane stalls and crashes into a trailer park, killing all on board plus two on the ground. The investigators discover a shocking secret which will turn the aviation world upside down.
42	10	"Texas Oil Explosion" ("Oil Fire in Texas")	Texas BP Refinery explosion	March 23, 2005	Oil refinery explosion	December 6, 2006
At the BP Oil Refinery in Texas City, a test on the distillation tower goes wrong. The next day workmen are starting a routine day when a carelessly parked pickup truck with its engine left running backfires when it is engulfed triggering a massive explosion which cause the death of 15 workers.
43	11	"Tornado Outbreak"	The Super Outbreak	April 3–4, 1974	Tornado outbreak	January 2, 2007
The most violent outbreak of tornadoes in history, the 1974 Super Outbreak, releases 148 tornadoes in 13 American states and one province in Canada. Thousands of homes are destroyed and more than 330 people die; 5,000 people are left homeless or injured. A team of meteorologists led by Ted Fujita will examine the tragedy to provide new methods to predict more precisely the future tornadoes. Note: The episode also take a brief look into the crash of Eastern Air Lines Flight 66.
44	12	"Space Shuttle Explosion" ("Space Shuttle Challenger")	Space Shuttle Challenger disaster	January 28, 1986	Space Shuttle disintegration	January 31, 2007
Space Shuttle Challenger blasts off from Cape Canaveral to start the STS-51-L mission. 73 seconds later, Challenger's boosters explode and send it into the ocean in pieces. All seven astronauts on board are killed.
45	13	"Eruption on Montserrat" ("When The Volcano Blew")	1995–1997 eruption of Soufrière Hills	July 18, 1995 – December 26, 1997	Volcanic eruption	March 7, 2007
In July 1995, the Soufrière Hills volcano on the Caribbean island of Montserrat spews ash over the island. The nearby capital of Plymouth is evacuated. Two years on, Soufrière Hills erupts violently. Pyroclastic flows rage down the mountain and destroy Plymouth and Bramble Airport, killing 19 people. The eruption generates a small tsunami. Note: This episode mainly focuses on the events of June 25, 1997.

== Season 4 (2011) ==
No. overall	No. in season	Title	Disaster	Date of disaster	Nature of disaster	Original release date
46	1	"9/11"	September 11 attacks	September 11, 2001	Terrorist attack (4 aircraft hijackings and intentional crashes into buildings)	September 5, 2011
On September 11, 2001, two aircraft are deliberately flown into two buildings of the World Trade Center and one is flown into the Pentagon. Another crashes in a field in rural Shanksville, Pennsylvania after the passengers and crew attempt to fight back against the terrorists. 3D animation from the "Pentagon 9/11" episode was reused in this episode as well.
47	2	"Pearl Harbor"	Attack on Pearl Harbor	December 7, 1941	Act of war	September 12, 2011
On December 7, 1941, Japanese forces attacks Pearl Harbor in the United States which is neutral in World War II, thus bringing the U.S. into the conflict; the attack is presented as a Japanese disaster, "A Day of Infamy", bombing a neutral country, missing key targets, and provoking a war they could never win. 2,403 victims are killed and 1,178 are wounded, while Japan loses 64 personnel, and 1 sub captain is captured. The U.S. has 328 planes and 19 ships damaged or destroyed, the most famous of which is the USS Arizona.
48	3	"Paddington Rail Disaster" ("Paddington Train Collision")	Ladbroke Grove rail crash	October 5, 1999	Train collision	September 19, 2011
On October 5, 1999, in morning rush hour two trains – an InterCity 125 High Speed Train and a Class 165 Thames Turbo commuter train – collide at Ladbroke Grove junction near London's Paddington station after the driver of the Thames Turbo fails to stop his train at a red signal. The trains collided at a combined speed of 130 m.p.h. producing a spectacular fireball. 31 people die (2 drivers and 29 passengers) and 523 are injured.
49	4	"Death in Mid-Air" ("Collision At 35,000 Feet")	2002 Überlingen mid-air collision	July 1, 2002	Mid-air collision	September 26, 2011
On July 1, 2002, a Bashkirian Tupolev Tu-154 and a DHL Boeing 757 cargo plane collide while they are over Überlingen, Germany and crash, killing all 71 people on board, including 45 Russian schoolchildren on a trip to Barcelona. Having lost his entire family, Vitaly Kaloyev would later murder the air traffic controller. Note: This episode was renamed "Collision At 35,000 Feet" whilst airing on National Geographic.
50	5	"Alpine Collision" ("Cable Car Collision")	1998 Cavalese cable car crash	February 3, 1998	Aerial tramway cable severing by aircraft	October 3, 2011
On February 3, 1998, a low-flying Northrop Grumman EA-6B Prowler of the United States Marine Corps hits the support cable of an aerial tramway near the Italian town of Cavalese, severing it. The cabin immediately plummets to the ground, killing the 20 occupants. The aircraft, though severely damaged by the cable, lands safely. Note: This episode was renamed "Cable Car Collision" whilst airing on National Geographic.
51	6	"Bhopal" ("Bhopal Nightmare")	Bhopal disaster	December 2–3, 1984	Industrial disaster	October 10, 2011
On December 2, 1984, in Bhopal, India, a toxic Methyl isocyanate (MIC) gas leak at a Union Carbide chemical plant results in the deaths of 3,000 people. Note: This episode was renamed "Bhopal Nightmare" whilst airing on National Geographic.

== Season 5 (2012) ==
No. overall	No. in season	Title	Disaster	Date of disaster	Nature of disaster	Original release date
52	1	"Fukushima"	Fukushima nuclear disaster	March 11, 2011	Nuclear disaster triggered by earthquake and tsunami	March 11, 2012
On March 11, 2011, the largest earthquake ever recorded in Japan's history, at magnitude 9.0, causes a tsunami off the country's east coast that results in 15,893 deaths, 2,572 missing, and 6,152 injured. The tsunami causes a meltdown at the TEPCO Fukushima Nuclear Power Plant causing Prime Minister Naoto Kan to resign five months later on August 25, 2011. The meltdown also displaced around 100,000 people from their homes, jobs, and farms in the nearly 12.5 mile exclusion zone around the plant.
53	2	"The Bismarck"	Bismarck sinking	May 27, 1941	Act of war	March 18, 2012
After several engagements over the previous days - including the sinking of HMS Hood during the Battle of the Denmark Strait three days prior - on May 27, 1941, elements of the Royal Navy sink the German battleship Bismarck, Germany's largest battleship ever made, and one of the largest warships of the Second World War.
54	3	"Mountain Tsunami"	1963 Vajont Dam disaster	October 9, 1963	Landslide and consequent flood	March 25, 2012
In 1963, a landslide from Monte Toc into the reservoir of the Europe's highest dam causes a giant wave that destroys a number of villages including the town of Longarone, claiming over 2,000 lives.
55	4	"Waco Cult"	Waco siege	February 28 – April 19, 1993	Police raid, shootout and building fire	April 1, 2012
In 1993, an armed religious cult called the Branch Davidians were led by the charismatic David Koresh. After a 51-day siege at the Davidians armed compound in Waco, Texas, the Federal Bureau of Investigation tries to end the standoff with tear gas, but a fire breaks out and engulfs the compound. By the end, 76 Davidians and 4 ATF agents die, including 22 children. This motivates Timothy McVeigh to retaliate by perpetrating the Oklahoma City Bombing.
56	5	"The Deepwater Horizon"	Deepwater Horizon explosion	April 20, 2010	Oil platform explosion	April 15, 2012
A series of decisions and mistakes lead to the deaths of 11 oil rig workers and the world's largest oil spill disaster.
57	6	"Mumbai Massacre"	2008 Mumbai attacks	November 26, 2008	Terrorist attacks (shootings and bombings)	April 22, 2012
On November 26, 2008, 10 Islamic terrorists of the Lashkar-e-Taiba organisation attack two luxury hotels (one of them the famous Taj Mahal Hotel), a Jewish educational center, a café and a train station in Mumbai, killing 166 people. They also placed pipe bombs in two taxis, which killed the drivers whilst driving to a hotel. Note: The episode features interviews with survivors like Dara Huang and Gulam Noon.

== Season 6 (2012) ==
Season 6 of Seconds from Disaster premiered on the one-year anniversary of the 2011 Norway attacks (July 22, 2012). The episode was promoted as a one-off special. The other nine episodes aired from November 5, 2012 in Australia with the episode "Jonestown Cult Suicide".

No. overall	No. in season	Title	Disaster	Date of disaster	Nature of disaster	Original release date
58	1	"Norway Massacre: I Was There" ("Norway Massacre")	2011 Norway attacks	July 22, 2011	Terrorist attacks (bombing and mass shooting)	July 22, 2012
On July 22, 2011, a gunman goes on a terrorist rampage – starting with an explosion in Oslo and ending with the murder of dozens of teenagers at a summer camp organised by the Worker's Youth League on the island of Utøya. Note: This episode was promoted as a special on National Geographic, but was under the Seconds from Disaster brand when the episode was sold to other channels.
59	2	"Jonestown Cult Suicide"	Jonestown cult murder-suicide	November 18, 1978	Cult suicide	November 5, 2012
On November 18, 1978, cult leader Reverend Jim Jones and his followers die in Guyana, South America. Congressmen Leo Ryan (D-CA) is assassinated, and Jim Jones dies of a self-inflicted gunshot wound to the head at a sermon in which 909 people of the cult die from drinking poisoned 'grape juice', the largest mass murder-suicide of U.S. citizens in history.
60	3	"Fire In The Cockpit"	Swissair Flight 111	September 2, 1998	In-flight fire and consequent aircraft crash	November 12, 2012
On September 2, 1998, a fire breaks out on board a McDonnell Douglas MD-11 while on a transatlantic flight, damaging vital systems and causing the aircraft to crash into the sea off the coast of Canada, killing all 229 people on board.
61	4	"Black Hawk Down"	Battle of Mogadishu	October 3–4, 1993	Acts of war	November 19, 2012
On October 3–4, 1993, the United States Army in Somalia is engaged in a battle that kills 18 US Rangers and around 1,000 Somali combatants.
62	5	"Into The Death Zone"	1996 Mount Everest disaster	May 10–11, 1996	Mountain climbing disaster	November 26, 2012
On May 10–11, 1996, nine climbers die on Mount Everest, including New Zealand climbing veteran Rob Hall.
63	6	"Terrified Over Tokyo"	Japan Air Lines Flight 123	August 12, 1985	Aircraft crash	December 3, 2012
On August 12, 1985, the rear pressure bulkhead of a Boeing 747 bursts, destroying the vertical stabilizer and severing all four of the aircraft's vital hydraulic systems. The crew keep the aircraft flying for 32 minutes until it clips Mount Takamagahara in Gunma Prefecture and crashes, killing all but four people out of the 524 passengers and crew on board. Tragically, the investigation discovers that more than the final four people survived the crash, but died as a result of the JSDF's hesitance in travelling to the crash site, believing that no one could have survived such a dramatic accident.
64	7	"Runaway Train"	Amagasaki derailment	April 25, 2005	Train derailment	December 10, 2012
On April 25, 2005, a seven-car commuter train derails and crashes just before Amagasaki Station in Japan, causing 107 deaths and 562 injuries. Investigations reveal that the driver made numerous mistakes during the minutes prior to reaching the derailment site, and the prevailing theory regarding the crash's cause uncovers a harsh and systematic 'retraining system' that led the driver to fear being punished for his numerous mistakes, leading him to push the train beyond safe operating limits.
65	8	"The Forgotten Bomb"	Atomic bombing of Nagasaki	August 9, 1945	Act of war	December 17, 2012
On August 9, 1945, during the final stages of World War II, the United States of America uses a nuclear weapon in combat for the second time, named Fat Man, against the industrial Japanese city of Nagasaki.
66	9	"Sinking The Coventry"	Sinking of HMS Coventry	May 25, 1982	Act of war	December 27, 2012
On May 25, 1982, during the Falklands War between the United Kingdom and Argentina, a low level bomb attack from Argentinian jets causes HMS Coventry to capsize within 20 minutes.
67	10	"Chinook Helicopter Crash"	1994 Mull of Kintyre Chinook crash	June 2, 1994	Helicopter crash	December 29, 2012
On June 2, 1994, a Royal Air Force Boeing Chinook helicopter crashes on the Mull of Kintyre, on the west coast of Scotland. All 29 people aboard die, 25 of them being counter-terrorism officers who battled the IRA. The initial investigation cites pilot error as the cause, but several more investigations take place over the next 17 years before this verdict is overturned.

== Season 7 (2018) ==
Episode 1, "Chopper Down", aired on 15 February 2018 at 8pm on National Geographic UK, while Episode 2 aired on 22 February with the title "Deadly Design".

No. overall	No. in season	Title	Disaster	Date of disaster	Nature of disaster	Original release date
68	1	"Chopper Down"	Battle of Mogadishu; 1994 Mull of Kintyre Chinook crash	October 3–4, 1993; June 2, 1994	Helicopter crashes	February 15, 2018
This compilation of previous Seconds from Disaster combines two helicopter crashes of a military nature. In 1993, a US Army Black Hawk crashed in the deserted streets of Mogadishu. In 1994, a Royal Air Force Chinhook HC-2 crashed into a hill on the west side of the Mull of Kintyre in Scotland after taking a group of VIP passengers from Northern Ireland to Fort George.
69	2	"Deadly Details"	Swissair Flight 111; Japan Air Lines Flight 123	September 2, 1998; August 12, 1985	Aircraft crashes	February 22, 2018
This compilation of previous Seconds from Disaster episodes combines two airliner crashes that took hundreds of lives. In 1998, Swissair Flight 111 fell from the sky due to a wiring fault that sparked a fire in the entire cockpit. This fire grew uncontrollably and led to the demise of all 229 people on board. In 1985, Japan Air Lines Flight 123 crashed into a remote mountainside after its rear pressure bulkhead failed, killing 520 people, making it the worst single aircraft accident in aviation history.
