= Situation Critical =

- Also known as: Critical Situation
- Genre: Documentary, Disaster, Survival
- Narrated by: Rufus Jones (UK); John Benjamin Hickey (US)
- Country of origin: United States
- Original language: English
- No. of seasons: 1
- No. of episodes: 13

Production
- Running time: 43–50 minutes
- Production companies: Darlow Smithson Productions, National Geographic Society

Original release
- Network: National Geographic Channel
- Release: June 12, 2007 – October 2007

Related
- Seconds from Disaster

Situation Critical (also known as Critical Situation in the US) is an American/British-produced documentary television programme. Produced in conjunction with the National Geographic Channel, the series examined various disasters or violent incidents. It was intended to extend Seconds from Disaster's brand to disasters that don't necessarily have an official investigation. The main tagline of the show reads, "This is Situation Critical," or some variation thereof. 13 episodes were created for the show.

== Episodes ==
Ep#	Episode title	Situation	Date of situation	Nature of situation
1	Hollywood Shootout ("North Hollywood Shootout")	North Hollywood shootout	February 28, 1997	Bank robbery, gunfight
1	When two police officers of the Los Angeles Police Department noticed two criminals robbing a branch of the Bank of America in North Hollywood, Los Angeles, California, they called the local police department for support. A gun battle lasting almost 45 minutes ensued; one criminal committed suicide, the other was killed by the S.W.A.T. team.			
2	Taliban Uprising	Battle of Qala-i-Jangi	November 25 – December 1, 2001	Prison revolt
2	Hundreds of inmates tried to shoot their way out of a makeshift prison for Taliban fighters in Afghanistan with television reporters trapped in the crossfire.			
3	SAS Jungle Rescue ("Operation Certain Death")	Operation Barras	August 25 – September 10, 2000	Hostage crisis
3	Twelve soldiers carrying out a patrol through a jungle in Sierra Leone were taken hostage by a group of rebels. They were eventually rescued.			
4	Apollo 13	Apollo 13	April 11–April 17, 1970	Oxygen tank explosion, emergency landing
4	An explosion aboard Apollo 13 in space resulted in the lunar mission being aborted and a subsequent emergency landing.			
5	Downed Pilot	Rescue of Scott O'Grady	June 2, 1995	Shootdown, manhunt and rescue
5	Bosnian Serb and United States military forces hunt for a pilot after he is shot down while flying over Bosnia and Herzegovina in an F-16 Fighting Falcon.			
6	Hell on High Water	1998 Sydney to Hobart Yacht Race	December 26, 1998	Thunderstorm
6	A severe storm disrupts the 1998 Sydney to Hobart Yacht Race and destroys several yachts.			
7	Killing Pablo Escobar ("Killing Pablo")	Capture of Pablo Escobar	December 2, 1993	Manhunt, criminal capture
7	Wanted drug lord Pablo Escobar is shot and killed while trying to evade capture.			
8	Moscow Theatre Siege ("Moscow Siege")	Moscow theatre hostage crisis	October 23–26, 2002	Hostage crisis
8	40 armed members of the Special Purpose Islamic Regiment took 850 theatre goers hostage at the Dubrovka Theatre in Moscow, culminating in a rescue operation that resulted in the deaths of the terrorists, but also of many of the hostages due to the gaseous substance used during the counterattack to subdue the terrorists.			
9	Assault On Entebbe	Air France Flight 139	June 27 – July 4, 1976	Aircraft hijacking, hostage rescue
9	Air France Flight 139, originating from Tel Aviv, takes off from Athens. Minutes later, it is hijacked by two Palestinians from the Popular Front for the Liberation of Palestine – External Operations (PFLP-EO) and two Germans from the German "Revolutionary Cells". The hostages were eventually rescued from the old terminal of Entebbe International Airport in Uganda by Israel Defense Forces special forces troops.			
10	Russian Sub Rescue ("Running Out of Air")	AS-28 training accident	August 4–7, 2005	Submarine entanglement, undersea rescue
10	Priz AS-28, a miniature submarine of the Russian Navy, becomes entangled in sunken fishing nets and the cables of a hydrophone array at a depth of 190 m in Berezovaya Bay off the coast of the Kamchatka Peninsula. 2 days later, the submarine was successfully freed with no loss of life, thanks to the aid of a British remotely operated vehicle.			
11	Al Qaeda Ambush	Battle of Takur Ghar	March 3, 2002	Meeting engagement
11	Members of United States Navy SEALs are ambushed by Al-Qaeda forces. During the initial ambush and subsequent battle, three Chinook helicopters were lost before the SEALs and reinforcements consisting of units of the 75th Ranger Regiment brought the engagement to a conclusion.			
12	Miracle at Quecreek ("Coal Mine Disaster")	Quecreek mine rescue	July 24–28, 2002	Mine shaft flooding
12	At the Quecreek Mine in Somerset County, Pennsylvania, coal miners accidentally dug into the poorly documented Saxman Mine, causing 500 million tonnes of underground water to flood the Quecreek mine. All nine miners trapped by the water were eventually rescued.			
13	Nightmare on Mt. Hood	2002 climbing accident	May 30, 2002	Climbing accident, fall into crevasse, helicopter crash
13	Seven climbers trying to scale the slopes of Mount Hood fall into a crevasse called The Bergschrund on the mountain, resulting in the deaths of three of the climbers. A Sikorsky HH-60 Pave Hawk of the USAF rescues the three climbers, but then crashes and rolls during its attempt to fly clear of the mountain, additionally injuring the five crew members on board. Both the crew and the surviving climbers make it out of the crash alive.			

== Reception ==
Emily Ashby of Common Sense Media wrote, "Suspenseful and well crafted, Critical Situation is an addiction waiting to happen for adults, but be wary about sharing it with kids, since it's full of graphic, violent re-enactments of gun battles and vehicular crashes. Rocky Mountain News's Mike Pearson had a positive review of the documentary about Pablo Escobar, stating, "Killing Pablo plays like a real-life thriller: violent, unpredictable and filled with high-tech gadgets."

Writing in The Age, Brad Newsome said, "Pick any episode of Situation Critical and you'll get an amazing story told clearly and concisely by people who were there." Another The Age review stated, "The Israeli special forces' daring rescue of the passengers of a hijacked airliner in Entebbe, Uganda, in 1976 is an amazing tale. It's also a fairly complicated one that could have become a muddle in the hands of lesser documentary makers. The folks behind Situation Critical, however, excel at weaving classy dramatisations, fine computer graphics and interviews with key players into clear, compelling narratives."

== See also ==
- Blueprint for Disaster
- Seconds from Disaster
- Seismic Seconds
- Mayday: Air Crash Investigation
- Trapped
- Zero Hour
