= 2009 Cataño oil refinery fire =

Explosion and fire in Bayamón, Puerto Rico

CAPECO explosion
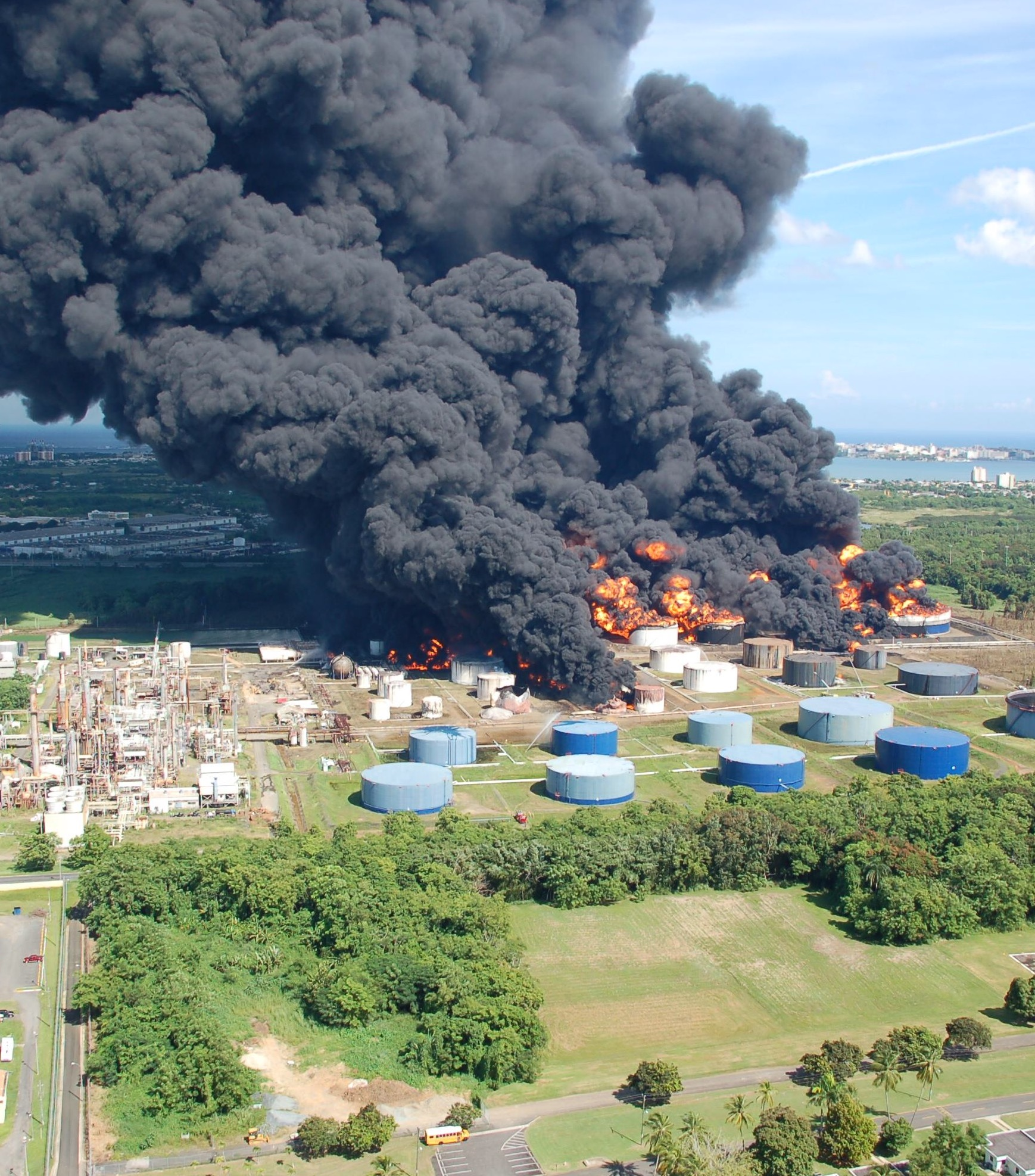
- Aerial view of the fire and the resulting smoke cloud
- Date: October 23, 2009; 17 years ago
- Time: 12:23am (AST)
- Location: Caribbean Petroleum Corporation oil refinery and oil depot Bayamón, Puerto Rico; 18.4165°N 66.1316°W
- Also known as: CAPECO explosion
- Cause: Malfunctioning tank fuel gauge
- Deaths: 0
- Injuries: 3
- Property damage: Several buildings and oil tanks damaged

The 2009 Cataño oil refinery fire, also known as the CAPECO explosion, was a fire that began with an explosion on October 23, 2009, and was extinguished on October 25 at the Caribbean Petroleum Corporation (CAPECO) oil refinery and oil depot in Bayamón, Puerto Rico. While the fire and subsequent explosion occurred close to the city of Cataño, it technically occurred within the borders of Bayamón, even though Cataño was more affected by fumes and evacuation. There were no fatalities, but three people were injured.

== Event ==
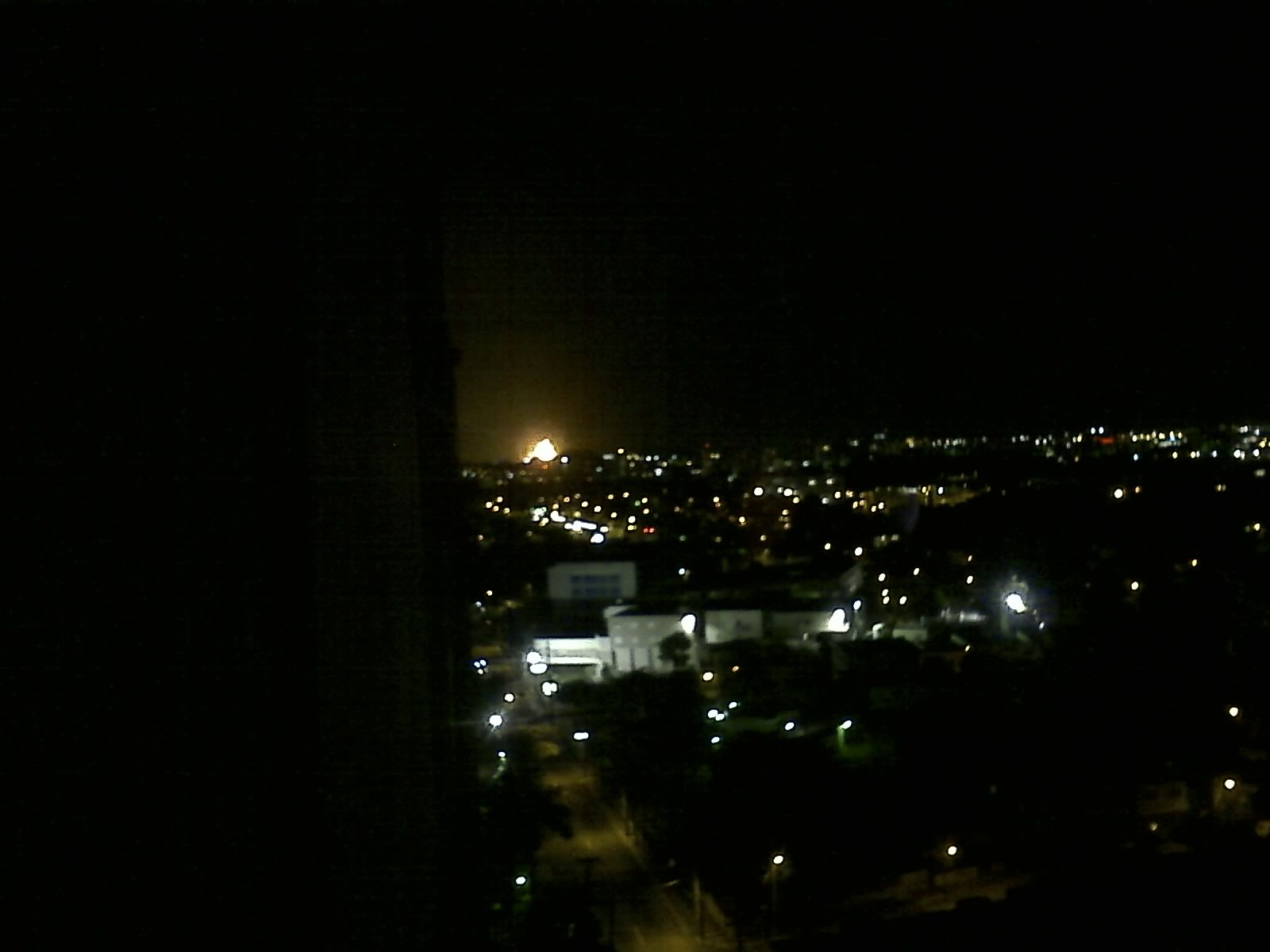
A picture taken minutes after the explosion from Río Piedras

The explosion destroyed eleven storage tanks and spread to others, generating a blast equal to a 2.8-magnitude earthquake. The 12:23 a.m. blast was heard 11 miles (18 km) away and shook windows over 2 miles (3.2 km) away. Flames reached 100 feet (30 m) above the refinery.

It released 30 million US gallons (110 Ml) of petroleum into San Juan Bay and wetlands, killing wildlife, including protected species. Environmental damage was severe, with millions in losses to nearby communities. About 600 people sought shelter.

Five workers escaped. Several drivers were injured by shattered glass, two people sustained minor injuries at Fort Buchanan, and four others sought treatment for respiratory issues.

=== Initial Response ===
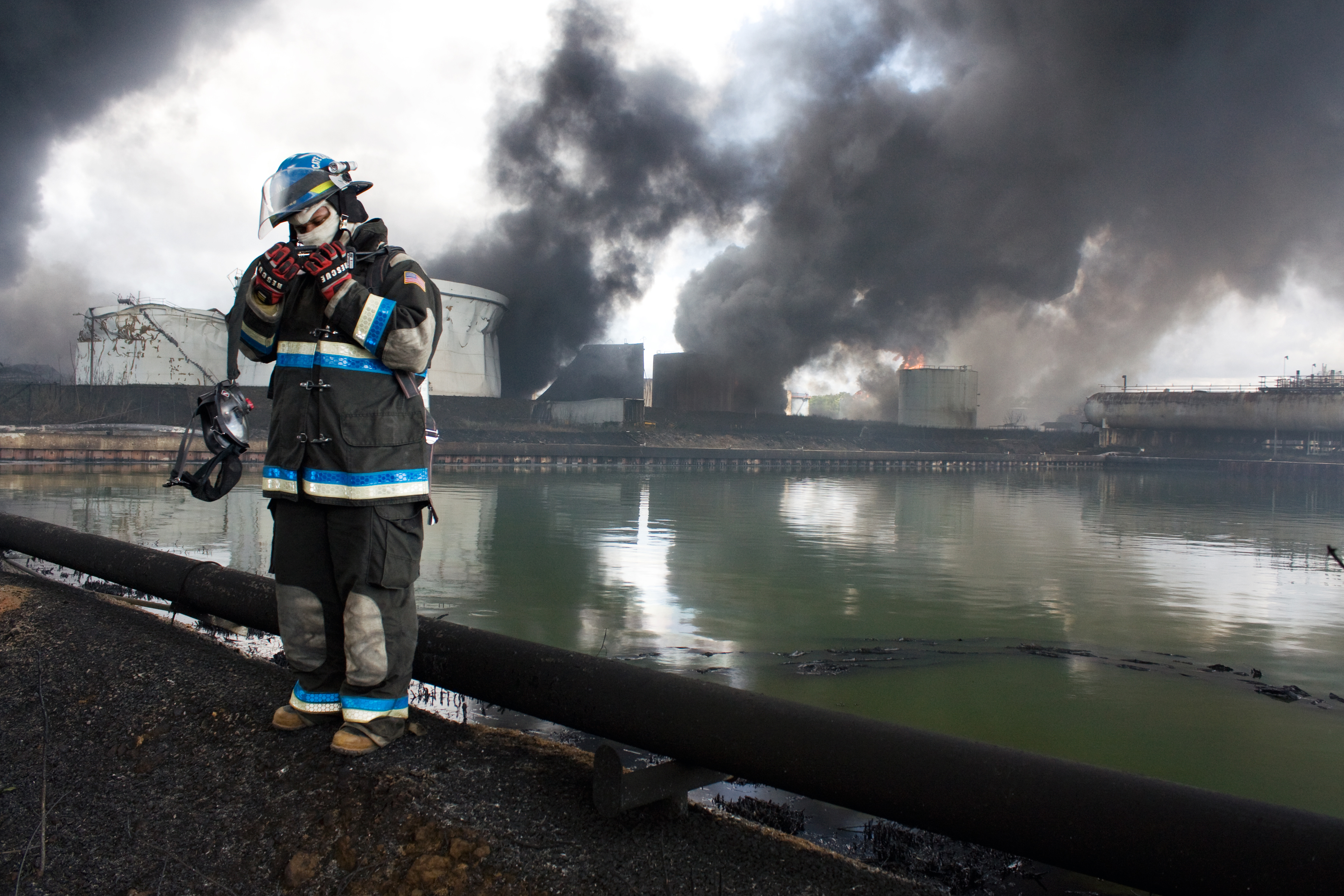
Firefighter inside the Gulf explosion perimeter

The call came to the Puerto Rico 9-1-1 office at 12:27 am. The Puerto Rico Fire Department stations of Bayamón and Cataño responded to the call once the tanks exploded. Later, due to the seriousness of the situation, PRFD had to make the decision to urgently call fire stations island-wide. Puerto Rico Police Department closed the De Diego Expressway due to the danger of the situation and a helicopter was patrolling the area. In less than one hour, firefighters from San Juan, Bayamón, Cataño, Toa Baja, Guaynabo, Carolina and Trujillo Alto responded to the urgent call. Other stations from other parts of Puerto Rico such as Ponce, Caguas, Arecibo, Humacao, and even Ft. Buchanan also responded to the scene. One hundred and thirty firefighters, with the support of the Puerto Rico National Guard, responded to the fire. Fifteen hundred residents were evacuated from four adjacent communities. Also, San Juan, Carolina and Bayamón city fire departments and the Luis Muñoz Marín Airport Crash and Rescue responded to the call. As a result of the smoke cloud, the U.S. Federal Aviation Administration diverted plane traffic.

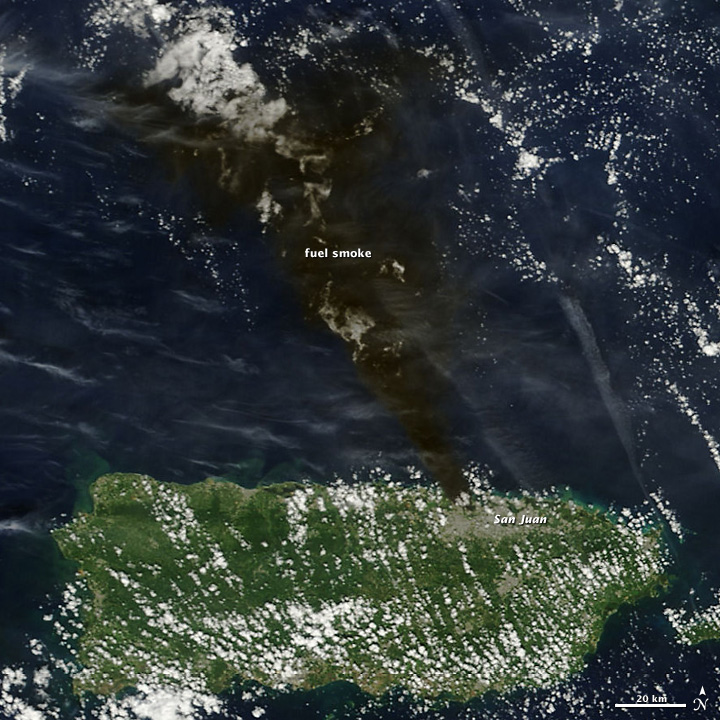
Visible satellite image taken by NASA's Terra Satellite showing the large area covered by black smoke produced by the fire.

To avoid further explosions, firefighters attempted to chill the remaining tanks to keep them from exploding, alongside the removal of dozens of fuel trucks being removed frok the area for the same reason. Due to the smoke cloud, authorities evacuated several communities downwind from it, as well as 80 people living in a secure facility for Justice Department witnesses. Governor Luis Fortuño canceled classes at nearby schools as well.

=== Local Response ===
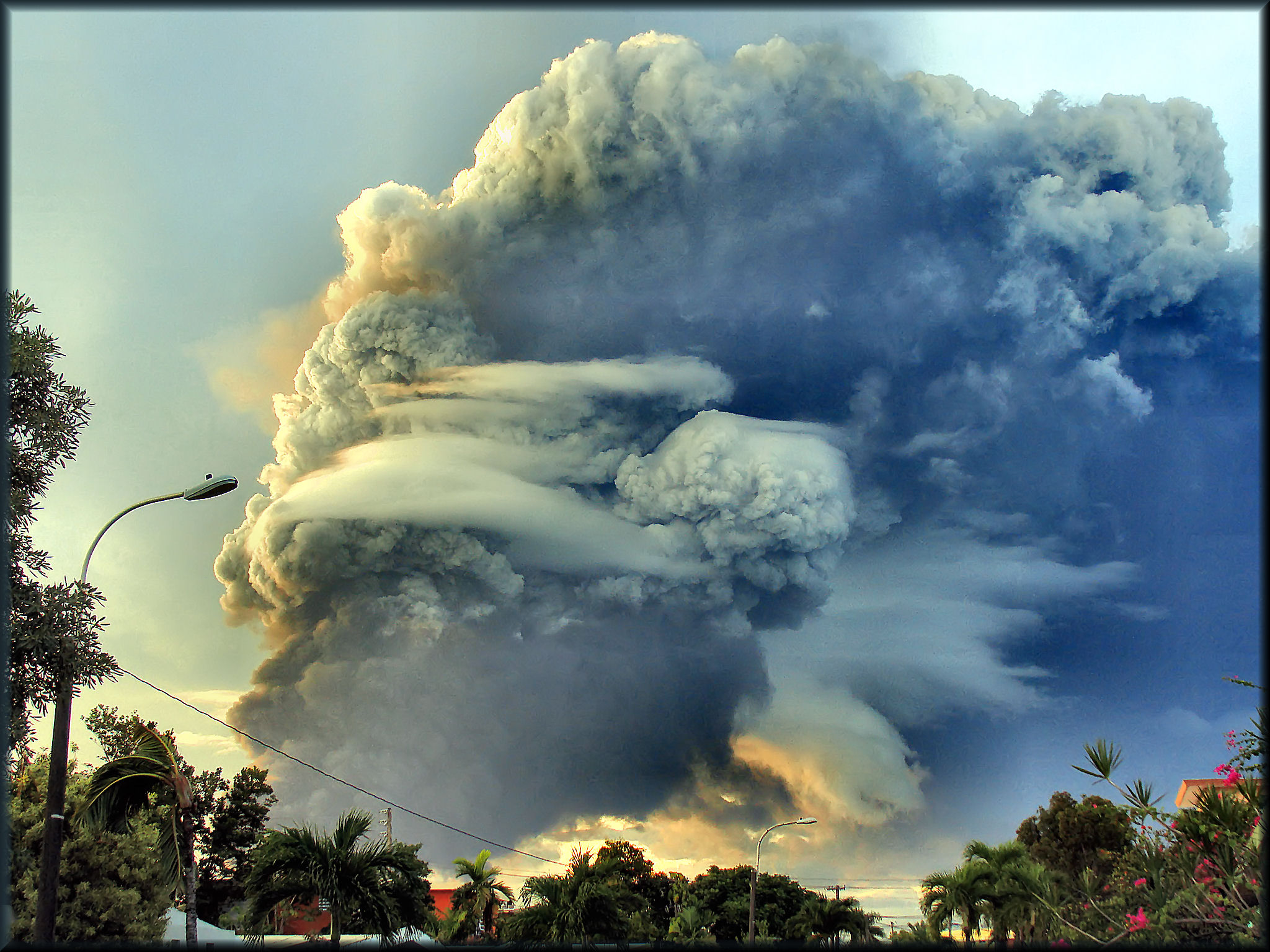
Caribbean Gulf Petroleum Explosion from Baldrich, Hato Rey

Puerto Rico Governor Luis Fortuño declared a state of emergency, and activated the Puerto Rico National Guard to support firefighters and aid the injured. Also, schools in the San Juan Metro Area were cancelled for the day, and some schools near the explosion area were closed until 4 days after the explosion due to evacuations.

=== Governmental Aid ===
President Barack Obama separately declared a federal state of emergency in Puerto Rico, clearing the way for U.S. federal agencies to coordinate disaster relief and authorizing the use of federal funds. Fighting the fire has cost the local Puerto Rican government more than $6.4 million, as of October 25. The United States Army announced that the explosion and fire had closed nearby Fort Buchanan until further notice.

Authorities built a temporary pipe to San Juan Bay in order to bring seawater to extinguish the fire, but the fire was extinguished before it could be used. Fire fighting foam was supplied from the nearby United States Virgin Islands. Luis Fortuño announced on October 25 that the fire had been extinguished, and estimated the initial cost to fight the fire at $6.4 million.

== Investigation ==
External videos
- Filling Blind (11:08), CSB Safety Video

On the days after the explosion, more than 60 agents from both the FBI and the Bureau of Alcohol, Tobacco, Firearms and Explosives were dispatched to the Caribbean Petroleum Corp. in Bayamón, just west of San Juan, to aid in the investigation, said ATF spokesman Marcial Orlando Felix. Several agents flew in from the U.S. Mainland.

The Caribbean Petroleum Corporation supplies most of Puerto Rico's oil and gasoline, which is marketed under the Gulf Oil brand name, but only 10 percent is managed from this plant. Government officials said at the time that Puerto Rico had enough fuel and diesel to last for 24 days after the disaster.

The morning after the explosion, police started investigating a graffiti found near the Minillas Tunnel in San Juan with the message: "Boom, fire, RIP, Gulf." However, the FBI later determined that they were not painted by anyone connected to the explosion.

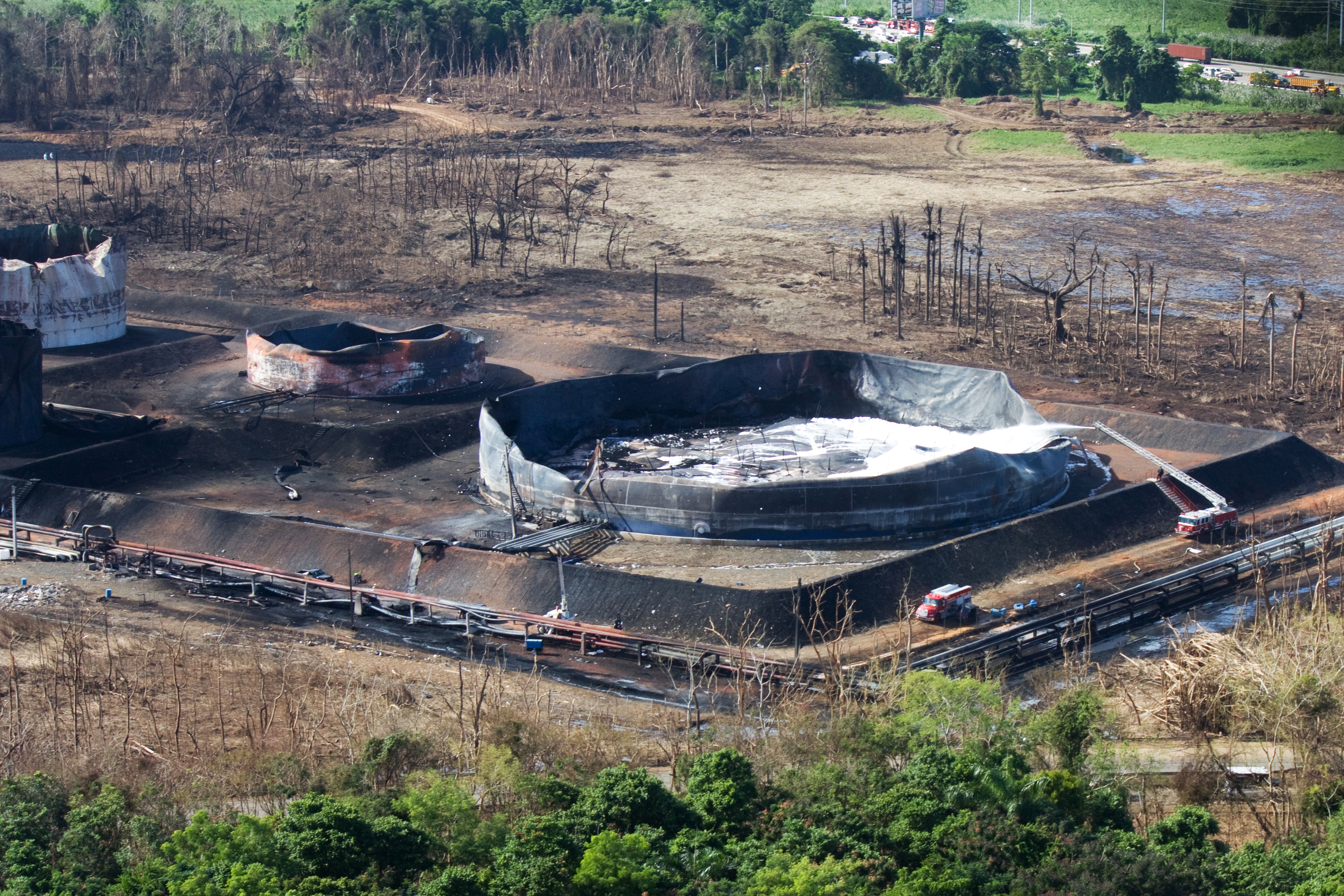
View of the damage caused to the vegetation and some of the tanks after the fire.

On October 30, 2009, the director of the FBI in Puerto Rico, Luis Fraticelli, said that more than 240 investigators analyzed the explosion and did not find evidence it was intentional. Authorities continued to investigate whether negligence was involved. The next month, officials from the U.S. Chemical Safety and Hazard Investigation Board announced that a malfunctioning tank fuel gauge led to the explosion. The faulty equipment prevented workers from noticing that one of the tanks was overflowing before the fuel vapors ignited after coming into contact with electrical equipment.

== Aftermath ==
The day after the explosion, a lawsuit was filed in the Federal District Court of San Juan against Caribbean Petroleum Corporation and MAPFRE Insurance Company. MAPFRE was later removed from the lawsuit. The action was filed by lawyers John Navares, Camilo Salas, and Daniel Becnel. On December 11, 2009, a third joint lawsuit was presented against Caribbean Petroleum Corp. by 1,000 defendants seeking $500 million in damages.

In August 2010, Caribbean Petroleum Corporation filed for bankruptcy under Chapter 11. The company cited debts of $500 million to $1 billion, against assets of $100 million to $500 million, according to the filing. The filing came after the company failed to comply with U.S. Environmental Protection Agency orders to clean the site of the explosion. Caribbean Petroleum claimed their financial situation prevented them from doing the work, and EPA took over the cleaning process.

== See also ==
- Dupont Plaza Hotel arson
- Humberto Vidal explosion
- Morris J. Berman oil spill
