= Ashton Smith =

American actor

- Occupation: Voice actor
- Years active: 1997–present
- Known for: Narrator of Seconds From Disaster
- Website: ashtonsmith.com

Ashton Smith is an American voice actor who has recorded voice-overs for many movie trailers, television commercials, and network promotions. He served as the narrator for the National Geographic documentary program Seconds From Disaster from 2004 to 2007.
