= Caribbean Petroleum Corporation =

Oil company in Puerto Rico

Caribbean Petroleum Corporation (CAPECO) is an oil company in Puerto Rico which owned an oil refinery in Bayamón having a capacity of 48 thousand barrels per day (7.6×10^{3} m^{3}/d). In addition, it operated 70 service stations in Puerto Rico under the Gulf Oil brand name. On October 23, 2009, an explosion took place in the decommissioned refinery that destroyed most of the facility. The company was sold in 2011 to Puma Energy.

== History ==
Caribbean Petroleum was incorporated in 1987 through the merger of Caribbean Gulf Refining Corp., Gulf Petroleum S.A., and Compañía Petrolera Chevron, Inc. The partners in the business were Israeli industrialist Gad Zeevi and Swiss businessman Michael Florsheim. On 7 January 1995 the company's Morris J. Berman ship ran aground off Escambrón Beach, San Juan and spilt 800,000 barrels of oil.

The Bayamón refinery began operations in 1955 and was acquired by Gulf Oil Corporation in 1962 and by Chevron Corporation in 1984 before passing to Caribbean Petroleum Corporation. The Bayamón refinery was shut down in April 1995 due to unprofitable margins, but reopened the next year. It output 48,000 barrels per day until 2000 when it closed.

The company filed for bankruptcy in 2001 and was reorganized in 2003 to operate solely in oil storage and distribution, from 170 service stations (branded as Gulf). The refinery became an oil depot and loading dock.

== Explosion and bankruptcy ==
On October 23, 2009, one of the tanks in the decommissioned refinery exploded due to a faulty gauge, leading to a massive fire that destroyed most of the facility. As a result, the company filed for bankruptcy.

The company field for chapter 11 bankruptcy protection in August 2010. The assets of the Caribbean Petroleum Corporation were purchased by Puma Energy Caribe, a subsidiary of Puma Energy, in a $82 million deal that completed in May 2011. The assets included 147 service stations as well as fuel storage facilities and land and docks at Bayamón and Cataño. As part of the deal Puma agreed to remediate land around the service stations and at Bayamón.
