= Rock-dumping vessels =

Watercraft and for dumping rocks on seabed

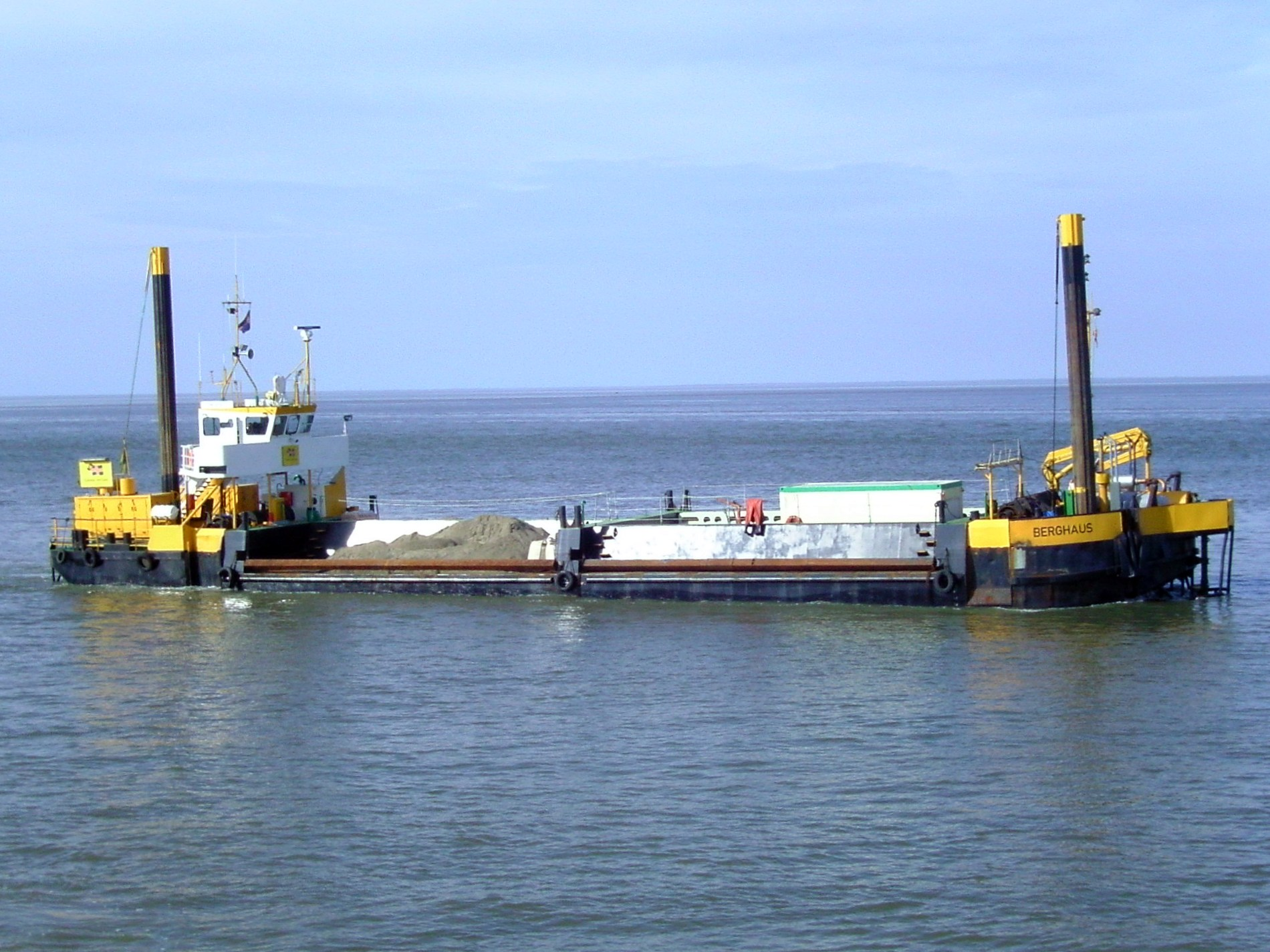
The stone dumping vessel Berghaus on the River Elbe in front of Cuxhaven.

Rock dumping vessels are a category of watercraft that exist for the purpose of dumping rocks on the seabed. They are able to transport and dump rocks of variable sizes. The vessels range from large bulk-carrier style vessels, able to carry out precision operations using fallpipes, to smaller deck-loading vessels mainly used for erosion remediation.

Almost all such vessels are fitted with a dynamic positioning system, which makes it possible to position rocks very accurately.

Large cranes or fall pipes are used to dump the rocks from the vessels. Side-discharging by means of crane is usually done in shallow waters, while fall pipes are more commonly used in deep-water rock-dumping operations.

The most common need for rock dumpers is to provide protection to previously laid pipelines in areas where they may be damaged by fishing gear. Pipelines at risk are not trenched, but remain on the seabed. There are a number of protection methods for such pipelines, including the placement of concrete mattresses, but for areas where a long distance of pipeline has to be protected, a rock-dumping operation may be most cost efficient.

Eclogite is often used because of its high density.

The Belgian dredging companies Jan De Nul and DEME Offshore are two global providers of rock-dumping operations. From the Netherlands Van Oord and Boskalis are also worldwide operators of dump vessels.

== Applications ==
- Protection of sub-sea infrastructures
- Thermal isolation of pipelines
- Leveling of the seabed prior to installing platforms, caissons, etc.

== See also ==
- Coastal erosion
- MV Rocknes
