= MV Rocknes (2001) =

Rock discharge vessel that capsized near Bergen, Norway in 2004

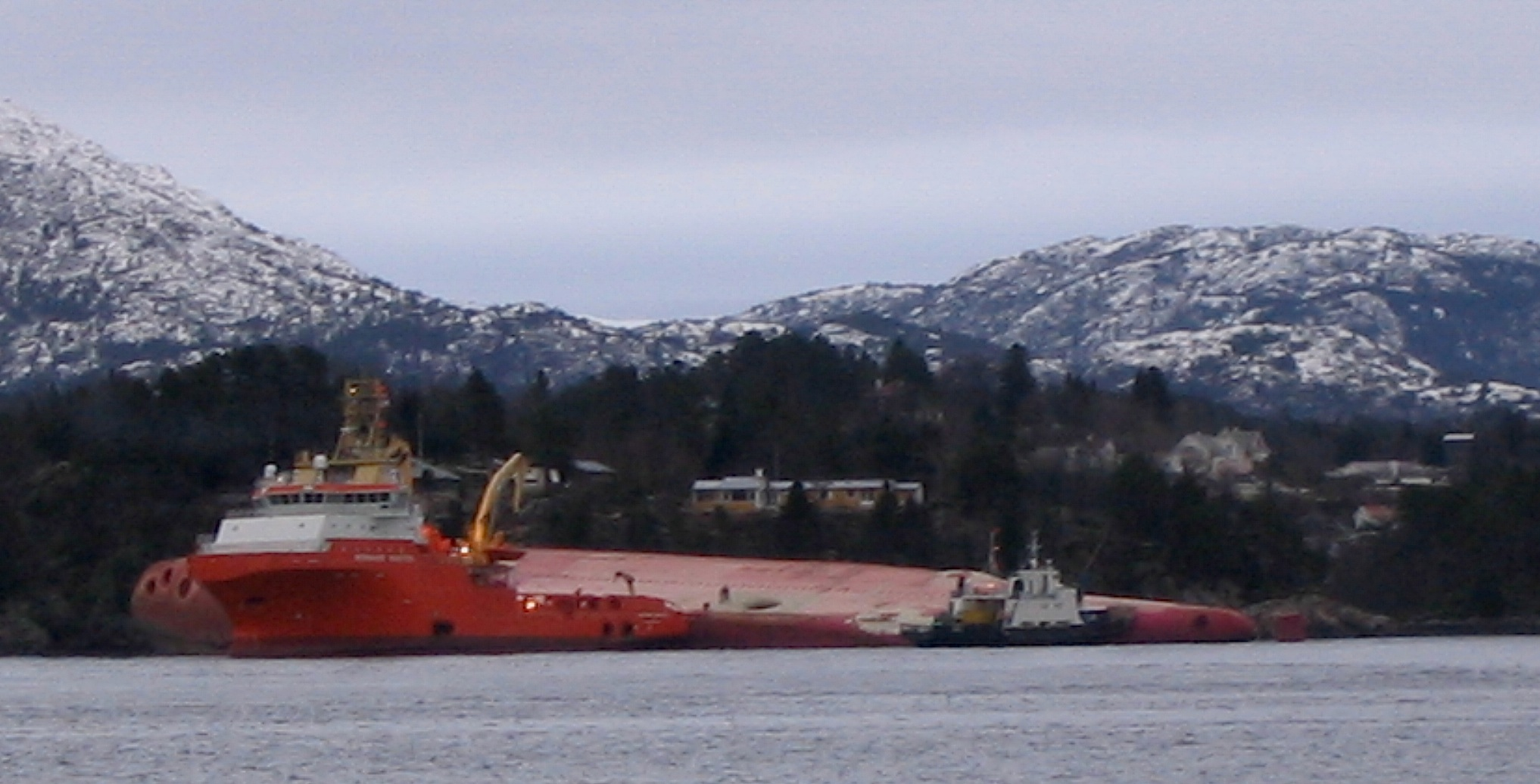
- MV Rocknes, ex-Kvitnes, which capsized in Vatlestraumen outside Bergen, Norway, 19 January 2004.

History
- Name: Kvitnes; Rocknes; Nordnes
- Launched: 29 June 2001
- Identification: IMO number: 9229910; MMSI number: 244962000; Callsign: PHOG

General characteristics
- Type: rock discharge vessel
- Length: 545 ft (166 m)
- Crew: 30

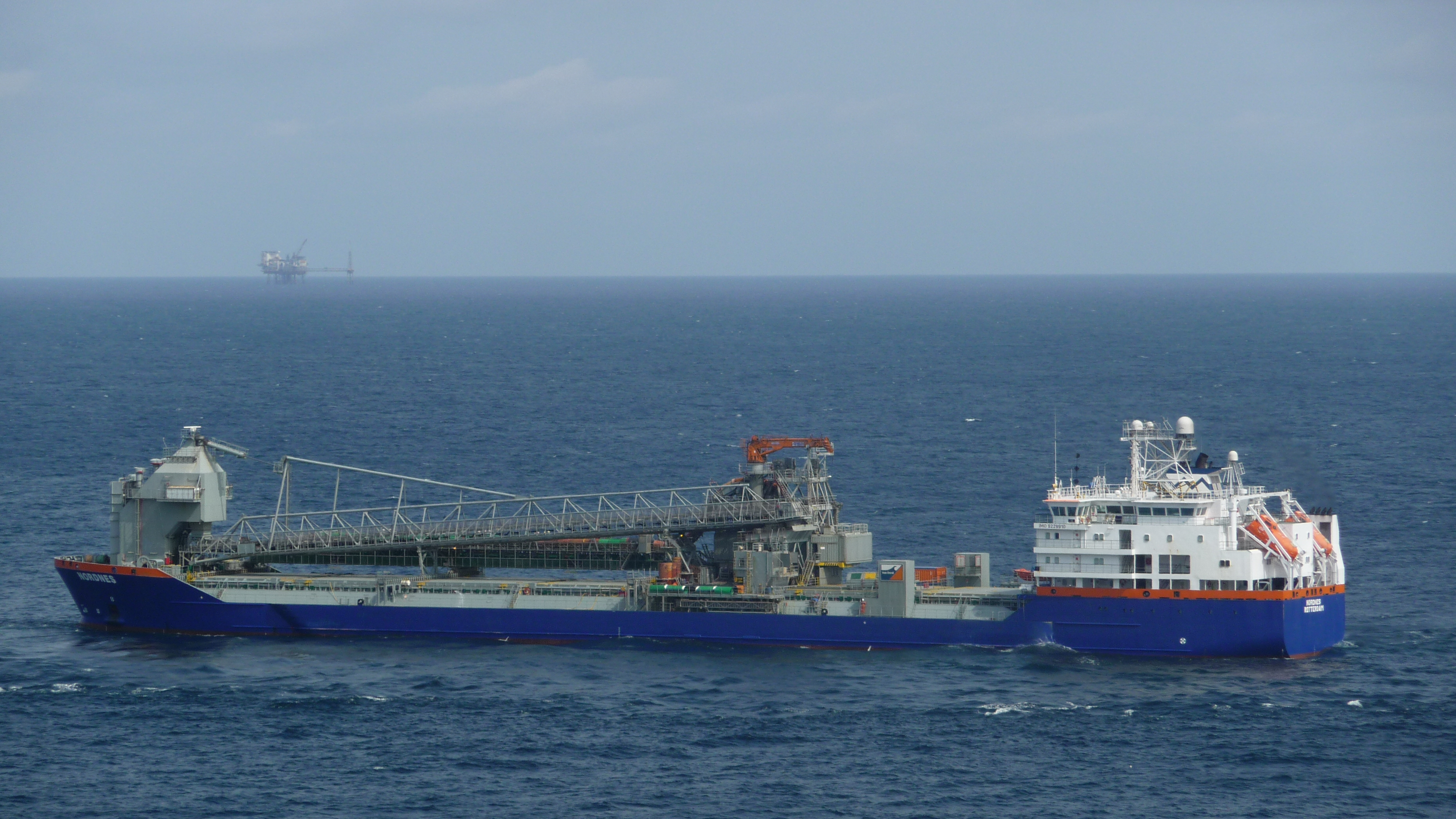
Nordnes

MV Rocknes was a 166-metre (545 ft)-long rock discharge vessel that hit shallow water and suddenly capsized south of Bergen, Norway on 19 January 2004, killing 18 members of its 30-person crew. At the time of its sinking, it was the world's largest dynamically positioned flexible fall pipe rock dumping vessel. The ship was repaired during 2004 and 2005 and renamed Nordnes.

Rocknes was owned by Kvitnes Shipping Company Ltd. of St. Johns, a part of the Hartmann group of Cadenberge, Germany. The ship was on a long-term charter to Van Oord ACZ, an international contractor specializing in dredging, rock dumping, and offshore and coastal construction.

== Conversion ==
Conversion of the ship was commissioned on 3 May 2003 in response to the increasing demand for offshore rock dumping. The ship was converted from the self unloading bulk carrier MV Kvitnes at Keppel Verolme Shipyard, Botlek, The Netherlands. The actual conversion was led by a design team formed by Van Oord ACZ. Post-conversion, the ship remained a capable bulk carrier, albeit with a reduction of 3,000 metric tons (3,000 long tons; 3,300 short tons) in cargo capacity and a loss of 0.6 knots (1.1 km/h; 0.69 mph) of sailing speed.

Conversion was scheduled for a maximum of 112 days, and was completed in 124 days.

=== Design challenges ===
Its large size (largest in the world of its type at the time of construction) created design challenges.

In order to create an economically feasible vessel of this size, the vessel must be designed with a high deadweight tonnage and a relatively high sailing speed to allow large quantities of rock, with densities ranging from 1.4–1.8 metric tons (1.4–1.8 long tons; 1.5–2.0 short tons) per cubic meter or 1.1–1.4 metric tons (1.1–1.4 long tons; 1.2–1.5 short tons) per cubic yard, to be rapidly transported to deeper waters farther from shore.

Because of the density of the rock, the ship must include large void spaces located ahead of, astern of, and to either side of the cargo holds in the hull to provide sufficient stability.

The holds themselves are loaded from above through hatches by shore-based equipment. They are designed with sloping sides and bottoms to allow them to be self-trimming and self-unloading via a conveyor belt running the length of the holds along the centerline of the ship at their lowest point.

The conveyors transport the rock to the forward part of the ship, into a rock hopper, then into flexible fall pipes that extend out of the ship's bottom through a moon pool. The ends of the fall pipes are fitted with purpose-built, state of the art remotely operated vehicles (ROVs) which ensure that the fall pipes are accurately guided along the cable or pipeline, ensuring highly precise deposition of protective rock ballast. These ROVs can also be used for dredging, trenching, and jetting tools.

The large quantity of heavy equipment mounted above the main deck of the ship raises its center of gravity and reduces its transverse stability.

== Sinking ==
MV Rocknes hit shallow water and suddenly capsized in four minutes south of Bergen, Norway, while on her way to Emden in Germany, killing 18 of 30 crew. She remained afloat upside-down.

=== Salvage ===
The Dutch salvaging company Smit International was hired to salvage the ship. As she had remained afloat upside down, a plan was designed to parbuckle the vessel, an exceptional approach for a ship of this size. Cables were attached from the 9000-ton vessel to two barges that had been specially prepared for this operation. She was towed into the harbour of Bergen, still capsized and after repairs the bulk-carrier was put back in operation.

== In the media ==
The sinking of Rocknes was broadcast on Discovery Channel in an episode of Blueprint for Disaster (in Europe broadcast under the name Minutes from Disaster). The sinking of the Rocknes also features in season 1 of Disasters at Sea.
