= Seconds from Disaster =

American/British documentary television series

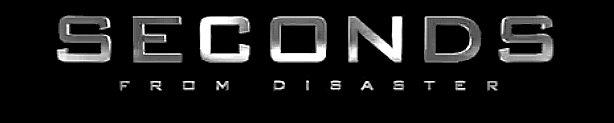
- Title card used between 2011 and 2018
- Genre: Documentary
- Based on: Historically relevant man-made and natural disasters from the 20th century
- Narrated by: Ashton Smith (US, Season 7); Richard Vaughan (UK); Peter Guinness (UK season 3)
- Composer: Graham Reilly
- Country of origin: United States / United Kingdom
- Original language: English
- No. of seasons: 7
- No. of episodes: 69 (list of episodes)

Production
- Running time: 25/45–50 minutes
- Production companies: National Geographic Society; Darlow Smithson Productions

Original release
- Network: National Geographic
- Release: July 6, 2004 – February 22, 2018

Related
- Seismic Seconds; Situation Critical

Seconds from Disaster is an American/British-produced documentary television programme that investigates historically relevant man-made and natural disasters from the 20th and early 21st centuries. Each episode aims to explain a single incident by analyzing the causes and circumstances that ultimately affected the disaster. The program uses re-enactments, interviews, testimonies, and CGI to analyze the sequence of events second-by-second for the audience.

Seconds from Disaster was first broadcast on the National Geographic channel in 2004 and originally consisted of 45 episodes over three seasons. Following its original conclusion in 2007, the show was put on a four-year hiatus and replaced with Situation Critical later that year. In 2011, National Geographic revived the show and aired another 22 episodes over three seasons until the following year. In 2018, the show revived again and aired two episodes featuring compilations about helicopter and airliner crashes. Narrators of the show are Ashton Smith, Richard Vaughan, and Peter Guinness.

== Format ==
Seconds from Disaster is characterised by an emphasis on chronological sequencing (in accordance with the show's name), the use of CGI technology and its blueprint-like CGI format. The show has little or no dialogue for the actors in the re-enactments, but instead is almost entirely dominated by the narrator.

Each episode begins with a chronological re-enactment of the disaster, which is always cut into several scenes displaying critical moments in the unfolding of the disaster with a clock appearing at the beginning of each scene. After the sequence of events, the show "winds back" the scenes to analyse the causes and events leading up to the disaster. The series uses blueprint-formatted CGI in every episode to reveal the anatomy of the disaster and the structures involved but in season 3, the blue formatting of the CGI is not used on the background and is replaced with a white background. From season 4 onwards, they used a sepia-like background. The show concludes with the original disaster scenes being rewound and played again; but this time, the clock is being replaced by a countdown timer and the conclusions reached from the analysis being put together with the sequence. Most often, the show finishes with a short moment of sentimentality (where those involved often speak of their emotions on the disaster) followed by the technological advances made to prevent similar disasters from happening again.

== Episodes ==
Season	Episodes	Originally released	
Season	Episodes	First released	Last released
1	13	July 6, 2004	October 26, 2004
2	19	June 28, 2005	July 11, 2006
3	13	July 25, 2006	March 7, 2007
4	6	September 5, 2011	October 10, 2011
5	6	March 11, 2012	April 22, 2012
6	10	July 22, 2012	December 29, 2012
7	2	February 15, 2018	February 22, 2018

== See also ==
- Blueprint for Disaster
- Situation Critical
- Mayday (Canadian TV series)
- Seismic Seconds
- Trapped (National Geographic Channel)
- Zero Hour (2004 TV series)
