= Seismic Seconds =

2000s multi-national TV series or program

- Also known as: Going Critical (Channel 4); Seconds from Death (National Geographic Channel)
- Genre: Documentary; Disaster
- Narrated by: Jack Davenport
- Country of origin: United Kingdom
- Original language: English
- No. of seasons: 1
- No. of episodes: 6

Production
- Running time: 23 minutes
- Production companies: Darlow Smithson Productions; Channel 4

Original release
- Network: Channel 4; National Geographic Channel
- Release: 2001

Related
- Seconds from Disaster

Seismic Seconds is a documentary television series that aired in 2001 on the National Geographic Channel and later that year on Channel 4. The program analysed the causes of six incidents, five involving the loss of human life. The better-known sequel to Seismic Seconds, Seconds from Disaster, was spun off from the series.

In the National Geographic version, the narrator says in the voiceover:

Disasters don't just happen. They're the result of a sequence of events, locked together in time. The science behind what went wrong is hidden in those seismic seconds.

The beginning of this voiceover:

Disasters don't just happen. They're the result of a sequence of events

was later used and modified for the series Seconds from Disaster:

Disasters don't just happen. They're the result of a critical chain of events.

== Episodes ==
#	Title	Disaster	Date of disaster	Nature of disaster
1	The Bhopal Gas Disaster	Bhopal disaster	3 December 1984	Human error
1	In Bhopal, India, lethal methyl isocyanate gas was accidentally released from a pesticides plant run by a subsidiary of Union Carbide. Between 2,500 and 5,000 people in Bhopal died on the day of the disaster, and thousands more have died since from ill-effects.			
2	The Crash of TWA 800	TWA Flight 800	17 July 1996	Electrical fault, central fuel tank explosion
2	Over the Atlantic Ocean, a Boeing 747 operating as TWA Flight 800 took off from John F. Kennedy International Airport. Twelve minutes into the flight the aircraft exploded and disintegrated, killing all 230 occupants.			
3	The Eruption of Mount St. Helens ("The Eruption of Mount St.Helens")	1980 eruption of Mount St. Helens	18 May 1980	Lava bulge opened by earthquake, volcanic eruption
3	Mount St. Helens, a volcano in the state of Washington that had lain dormant for 123 years, began to experience seismic activity in March 1980. A series of earthquakes and small eruptions ensued as a large bulge grew in the North face of the mountain. On 18 May, another earthquake caused the north face to collapse, triggering an eruption that blew off the top and side of the volcano. 57 tourists, local residents and scientists perished.			
4	The Death of Ayrton Senna ("The Death of Aryton Senna")	1994 San Marino Grand Prix crash	1 May 1994	Loss of control of Williams FW16
4	At the San Marino Grand Prix track, triple Formula One world championship winner Ayrton Senna lost control of his car and crashed into a concrete barrier wall at Tamburello. Then the front right tire flew up and struck his helmet. Senna was killed instantly.			
5	The Sinking of HMS Coventry	HMS Coventry sinking	25 May 1982	Enemy aircraft bombing, failed intercept by HMS Broadsword
5	During the Falklands War, two British warships - HMS Coventry and HMS Broadsword - prepared for battle, tasked with defending the British fleet from air attack. An attack force of Argentinian aircraft bombed the Coventry and the Broadsword. One bomb hit the Broadsword, but failed to explode until it had exited the ship's hull. Three bombs hit the Coventry, of which two exploded on board. The Coventry capsized shortly afterwards and sank the next day. Nineteen crew members were killed.			
6	The Airshow Miracle	RIAT MiG-29 collision	24 July 1993	Pilot error
6	At the then-biannual Royal International Air Tattoo held at RAF Fairford, two Mikoyan MiG-29s flying an aerobatics routine as part of the Tattoo air display collided in mid-air. Both pilots ejected from their aircraft and survived the accident, and there were no fatalities among the spectators.			

== See also ==
- Blueprint for Disaster
- Seconds from Disaster
- Situation Critical
- Mayday/Air Crash Investigation
- Trapped
