= Trapped (2007 TV series) =

- Genre: Documentary; Disaster; Survival
- Narrated by: Albert Schultz
- Countries of origin: United States; Canada
- Original language: English
- No. of seasons: 1
- No. of episodes: 6

Production
- Running time: 45–50 minutes
- Production company: Cineflix Productions

Original release
- Network: National Geographic Channel
- Release: November 7 – December 12, 2007

Trapped is a six-episode documentary television series that premiered on November 7, 2007, on the National Geographic Channel. Produced in association with the Canadian National Geographic Channel and Cineflix (which produced Mayday, also known as Air Crash Investigation), the program examined various actual incidents or disasters in which victims were trapped on the site.

== Episodes ==
No.	Title	Situation	Situation duration	Nature of Situation	Original release date
1	"Alive in the Andes"	Fuerza Aérea Uruguaya Flight 571	October 13 – December 23, 1972	Aircraft crash	November 7, 2007
A Fairchild FH-227 carrying five crew and forty passengers, many of them rugby players from Stella Maris College's "Old Christians" team, hits the side of a mountain (later named as Cerro Seler) in the Andes Mountains. Twelve of the occupants die instantly; more die as the survivors wait to be rescued. The sixteen remaining survivors are rescued more than two months after the crash.
2	"Ocean Emergency"	RORO vessel Camilla	January 23, 2003	Disabled ship	November 14, 2007
MV Camilla, a Finnish roll-on/roll-off cargo ship in Canadian waters, suffers a main engine failure. With a storm approaching, the captain declares an emergency to the Canadian Coast Guard. A squad of Canadian Armed Forces rescuers from 103 Search and Rescue Squadron fly to the ship and the sixteen members of Camilla's crew are safely evacuated.
3	"Osaka Train Wreck"	Amagasaki derailment	April 25, 2005	Train derailment	November 21, 2007
A JR-207 type train, bound for Osaka on a commuter service, derails on a curve at a speed greater than the limit for that section of track. The two front carriages crash into an adjacent apartment block. 107 people are killed and 555 are injured.
4	"Earthquake Rapid Response"	2005 Kashmir earthquake	October 8, 2005 – October 12, 2005	Earthquake victim rescue	November 28, 2007
An earthquake of magnitude 7.6 on the Richter scale rocks Pakistan. Two ten-storey blocks in the Margalla Towers, a luxury apartment complex in Islamabad, collapse. A rescue team from the United Kingdom, Rapid UK, goes to Islamabad to help rescue victims from the towers.
5	"Hurricane Hospital"	Tulane Hospital flood	August 29, 2005 – August 30, 2005	Flooded hospital	December 5, 2007
The 300-bed Tulane University Hospital in New Orleans, Louisiana takes in patients from other hospitals during Hurricane Katrina. Relatives of the patients and others also arrive until there are over 2,000 people at the hospital. The hospital is being powered by emergency generators in the basement and has no running water. When the basement starts to flood after the hurricane, the decision is made to evacuate. The patients, staff and everyone else are airlifted from the hospital's car park roof by helicopter.
6	"Cave Rescue"	Vitarelles cave system	November 11 - Late November 1999	Flooded cave	December 12, 2007
7 men are trapped underground. They are not saved until over a week later.

== See also ==
- Blueprint for Disaster
- Mayday: Air Crash Investigation
- Seconds from Disaster
- Seismic Seconds
- Situation Critical
