= Blueprint for Disaster =

Canadian documentary television series

- Also known as: Minutes from Disaster
- Genre: Documentary; Disaster
- Narrated by: Adrian Bell (Season 1); Shawn Murray (Season 2); Tony Hirst
- Country of origin: Canada
- Original language: English
- No. of seasons: 2
- No. of episodes: 12

Production
- Executive producer: David York
- Running time: 45-48 minutes
- Production company: Temple Street Productions

Original release
- Network: Discovery Channel Canada
- Release: January 9, 2005 – April 28, 2006

Blueprint for Disaster is a Canadian documentary television series that premiered in 2005 on Discovery Channel Canada. Produced by Temple Street Productions, the program investigates why and how various disasters have happened. As of 2006, two seasons have been produced.

On 12 June 2006, Discovery Channel rebranded season 2 and called it under the name Minutes from Disaster in the UK. It was noted that the show's name and format shared similarities with the National Geographic Channel show Seconds from Disaster, this caused National Geographic to consider taking legal action against Discovery Channel as it seemed to have copied the show. National Geographic's lawyers would later write to Discovery Channel to pull the show from airing, which they refused to do. It is unclear whether National Geographic decided to pursue legal action afterwards.

== Episodes ==
=== Season 1 ===
"The King’s Cross Disaster" and "The Mystery of the Derbyshire" were premiered back to back at 8pm and 9pm respectively on Discovery Channel Canada.

| № | # | Title | Date of disaster | Disaster | Airdate | Description |
|---|---|---|---|---|---|---|
| 1 | 1 | "The Inferno at Kaprun" | November 11, 2000 | Kaprun disaster | January 27, 2005 | 155 skiers die in a fire at Kaprun Ski Resort. The deadly chain of events was caused by a heater in the rear attendant's cabin that also affected the alpine station 2 kilometres above the tunnel. |
| 2 | 2 | "The Crash at Eschede" | June 3, 1998 | Eschede train disaster | January 20, 2005 | A train derails, killing 101 people. Each wheel and carriage had to be re-engineered and replaced as a result of the incident. |
| 3 | 3 | "The Collapse of Big Blue" | July 14, 1999 | Big Blue collapse at Miller Park | February 3, 2005 | A gigantic crane (Lampson Transi-Lift 3 nicknamed Big Blue) standing at 567 ft toppled while manoeuvring a 450-ton roof section at Miller Park Stadium in Milwaukee, killing three workers and causing damage to the stadium. |
| 4 | 4 | "The Sampoong Collapse" | June 29, 1995 | Sampoong Department Store collapse | January 13, 2005 | Seoul's posh Sampoong department store collapsed in 20 seconds with more than 1,500 people inside. Investigators discover secrets in the original blueprint that explain the collapse. |
| 5 | 5 | "The Mystery of the Derbyshire" | September 10, 1980 | MV Derbyshire | January 9, 2005 | A ship vanishes without any trace. The investigation took 20 years before the cause of the tragedy was determined beyond doubt. |
| 6 | 6 | "The King's Cross Disaster" | November 18, 1987 | King's Cross fire | January 9, 2005 | A fire kills 31 people at King's Cross station. Investigators spend months trying to explain the fire's unusual pattern, which they determined was started by a smoker's match. |

=== Season 2 ===
| № | # | Title | Date of disaster | Disaster | Airdate | Description |
|---|---|---|---|---|---|---|
| 7 | 1 | "Explosion at Enschede" | May 13, 2000 | Enschede fireworks disaster | March 24, 2006 | In Enschede, the Netherlands the S.E. Fireworks storage compound situated in a residential neighbourhood catches fire and explodes, killing 22 (4 firefighters and 18 civilians) and injuring more than 1,000. There were two explosions, with the first explosion equivalent to 800 kg TNT and the second was equivalent to just under 5,000 kg of TNT. The facility was authorized to hold 1.4G grade fireworks but actually contained quantities of 1.1G grade fireworks, adding to this, the facility was overloaded at the time. |
| 8 | 2 | "Off the Rails" | January 31, 2003 | Waterfall rail accident | April 7, 2006 | A four-carriage double-decker passenger train derails in New South Wales, Australia and slams into a rock face, killing 7 people. |
| 9 | 3 | "Wreck of the Rocknes" | January 19, 2004 | MV Rocknes | March 31, 2006 | The MV Rocknes, a 166m long fallpipe vessel, hit a shallow and suddenly capsized south of Bergen, Norway, killing 18 of 30 crew. |
| 10 | 4 | "Destruction in the Desert" | May 4, 1988 | PEPCON disaster | April 14, 2006 | At the Pacific Engineering and Production Company (PEPCON) in Henderson, Nevada which manufactures ammonium perchlorate (used in solid rocket fuel) has two massive explosions and damages an area 10 miles wide with 2 fatalities and 300+ people injured. The first explosion measured 3 on the Richter scale while the second measured 3.5 (equal to 1.5 million pounds of TNT). A Las Vegas airport (7 miles away) reported broken windows. |
| 11 | 5 | "Hong Kong Inferno" | November 20, 1996 | Garley Building fire | April 21, 2006 | In the deadliest building fire disaster in Hong Kong's history, hundreds of workers are trapped in the top floors of a 16-storey commercial tower. 41 people died, 81 others were injured. |
| 12 | 6 | "San Juan Explosion" | November 21, 1996 | Humberto Vidal explosion | April 28, 2006 | A foul smell hangs around in the Humberto Vidal Shoe Store. After an air conditioner is switched on, the store explodes. |

== See also ==
- Seconds from Disaster
- Seismic Seconds
- Mayday
- Trapped
