= Morris J. Berman oil spill =

Oil spill on the shores of San Juan, Puerto Rico

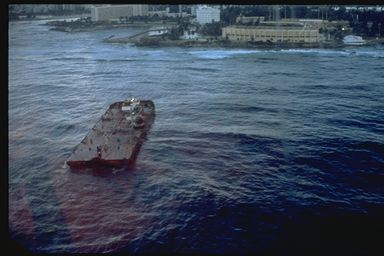
- Barge off the coast of San Juan
- Interactive map of Morris J. Berman oil spill
- Location: San Juan, Puerto Rico
- Coordinates: 18.4684°N 66.0904°W
- Date: January 7, 1994; 32 years ago

Cause
- Cause: Collision with a coral reef

Spill characteristics
- Volume: 18,000 bbl (2,900 m^{3})
- Area: 1,100 mi^{2} (2,800 km^{2})
- Shoreline impacted: 103 mi (166 km)

The Morris J. Berman oil spill occurred on January 7, 1994, when the Morris J. Berman, a single-hull 302-foot-long barge, with the capacity to carry more than 3 million gallons of oil, collided with a coral reef near San Juan, Puerto Rico, causing the release of 750,000 gallons of heavy grade oil. The spill affected the tourism and fishing industries as well as wildlife along the shores of Puerto Rico, Isla de Culebra, and Isla de Vieques. The spill had major long-lasting impacts on the biological and natural resources of the entire Puerto Rican area. This spill was also the first to occur in U.S. waters after the passing of the Oil Pollution Act of 1990.

== The incident ==
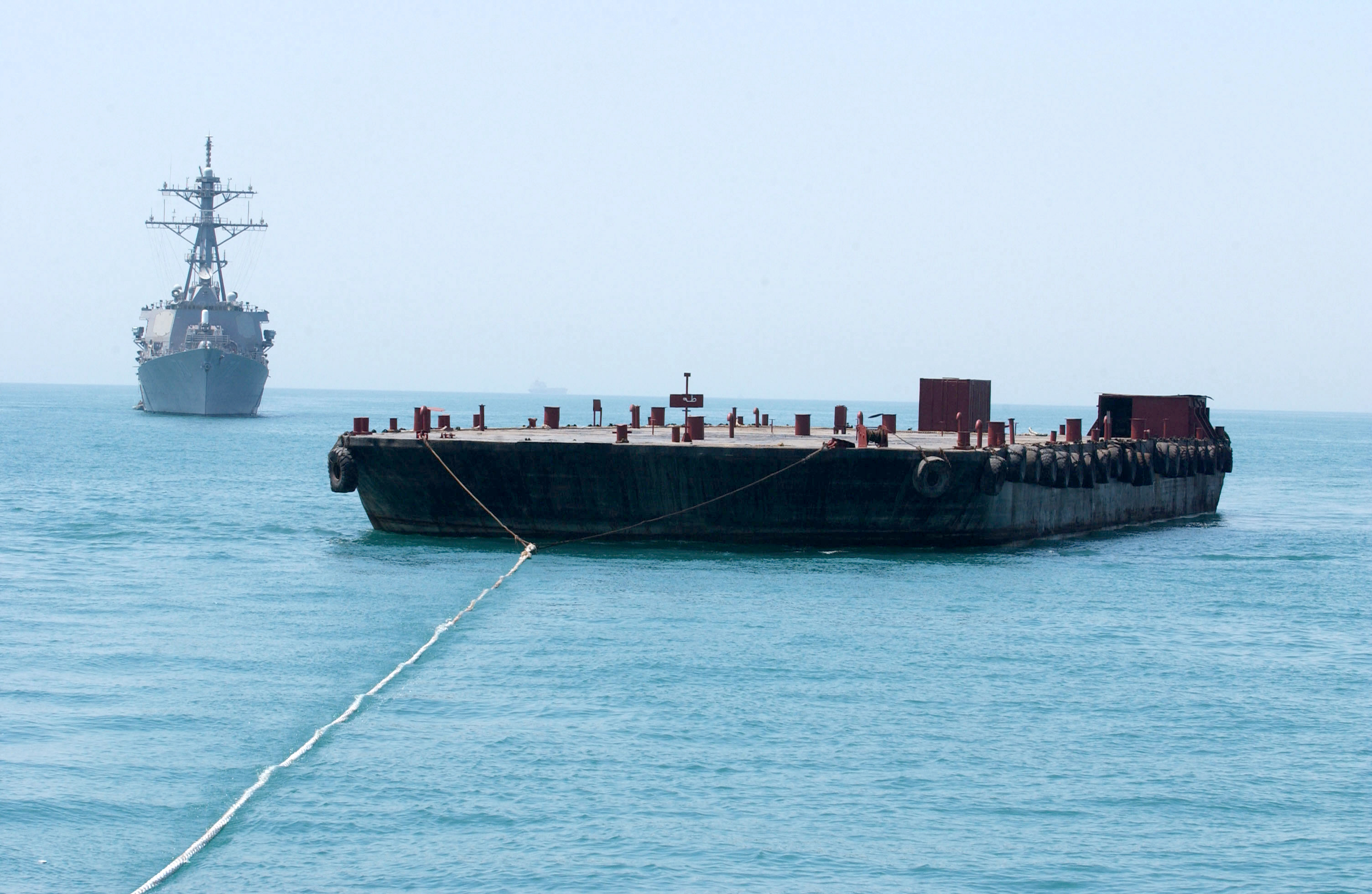
An example of an oil barge being towed by a towing cable

The Morris J. Berman left the Port of San Juan, Puerto Rico in the early morning hours of January 7, 1994 in tow behind the tug boat Emily S., carrying a total of 1.5 million gallons of oil. The barge was nearly two hours into its trip to Antigua when the towing cable connecting the Berman to the Emily snapped for the first time. Repairs were made to the cable, and the voyage continued. At 3:50 AM, the cable snapped a second time, and the barge broke free striking a coral reef off of Escambron Beach, near San Juan. The impact caused extensive damage to two of the barge's nine holding tanks, releasing 750,000 gallons of Number 6 fuel oil. An intense northerly wind added to the damage done to the vessel by pounding the stranded barge with heavy surf. Oil washed on shore in Puerto Rico between Punta Boca Juana and Punta Vacia Talega. Oil also affected the shores of Culebra, an island to the east of Puerto Rico. Most of the areas threatened and impacted by the spill were sheltered lagoons, biota-rich intertidal zones, and beach dunes, which are all habitats for many species. Several historic locations were also threatened and impacted by the oil, including pre-Columbian ruins, historic walls and bridges, and Spanish-era forts. The vast majority of these affected areas were located on the north shore of Puerto Rico.

== Environmental effects ==
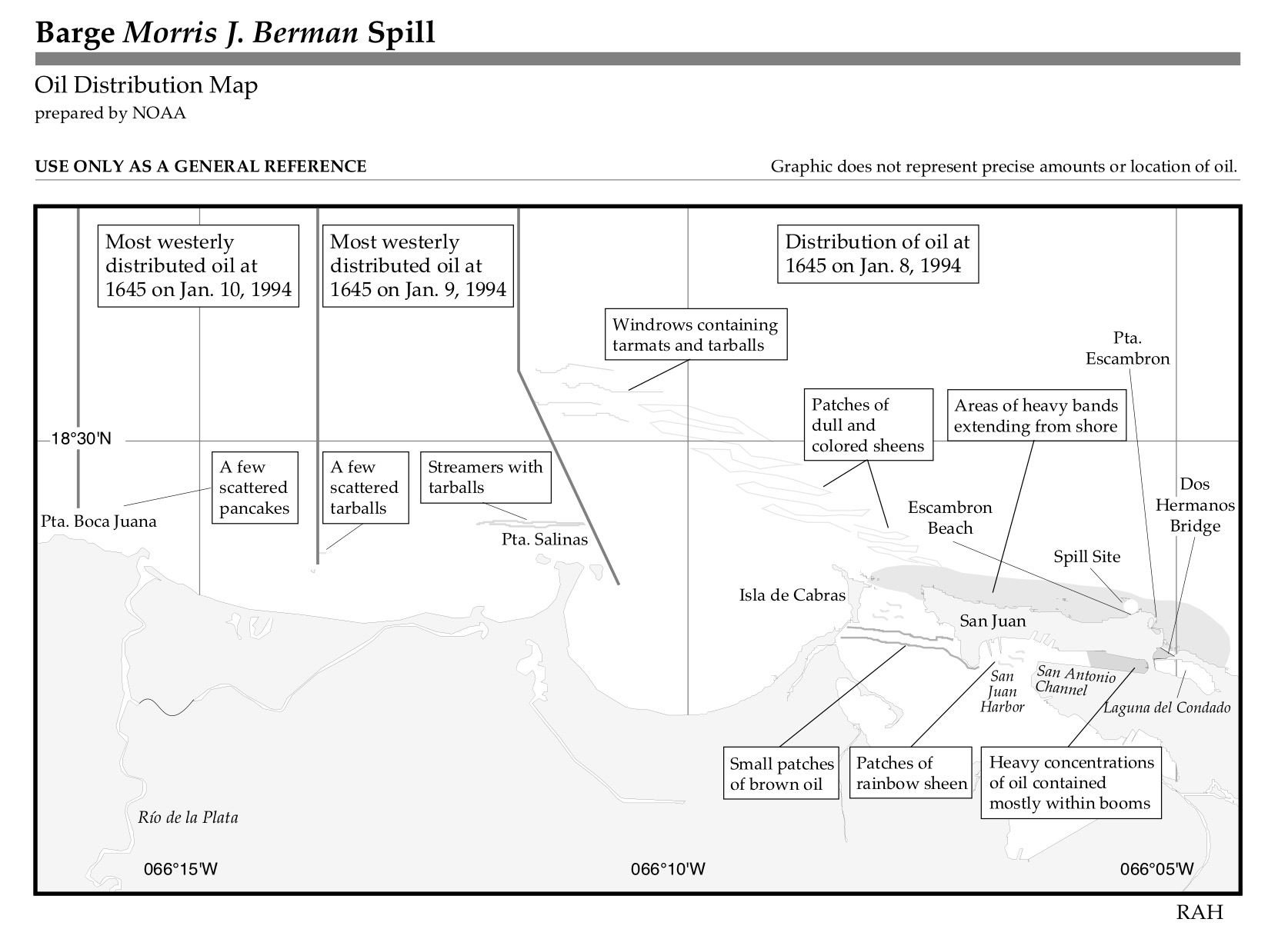
Oil Spill Contamination Map

The spill affected most of the environmental resources present in the shore and offshore areas near San Juan. 1,100 square miles of surface waters along the north coast of Puerto Rico were projected to have felt effects from the oil. It was also projected that 103 miles of ocean shore line and 66 miles of bay shoreline were covered in oil. Seagrasses and sediments were also contaminated in the spill area. It is projected that 40,000 square meters of seagrasses in lagoons near the spill area were impacted by sunken oil. This caused most of the grasses to die. All of the affected areas were covered in varying amounts oil which resulted in large amounts of pollution, loss of tourism, loss of habitat, and loss of life for living organisms.

The spill made many important habitat areas unusable by many species for a period of time. One example of lost habitat was the loss of intertidal bay and shallow waters that were used for fish as nursery areas. This affected the population levels of certain species of fish in the years following the spill. Another example of lost habitat was the reef area lost near the grounding site of the Berman. Over 152 species were estimated to have resided in these reefs. Some of these species include fish, shellfish, algae, and sponges. The reef was the main source of food and shelter for all of these species. The reef also provided a natural breakwater that helped to diminish storm surge from hurricanes. The effectiveness of the reef as a breakwater and habitat area were greatly decreased after it was damaged by the barge. Large pieces of the reef were lost after the barge ran into it.

== Effects on tourism ==
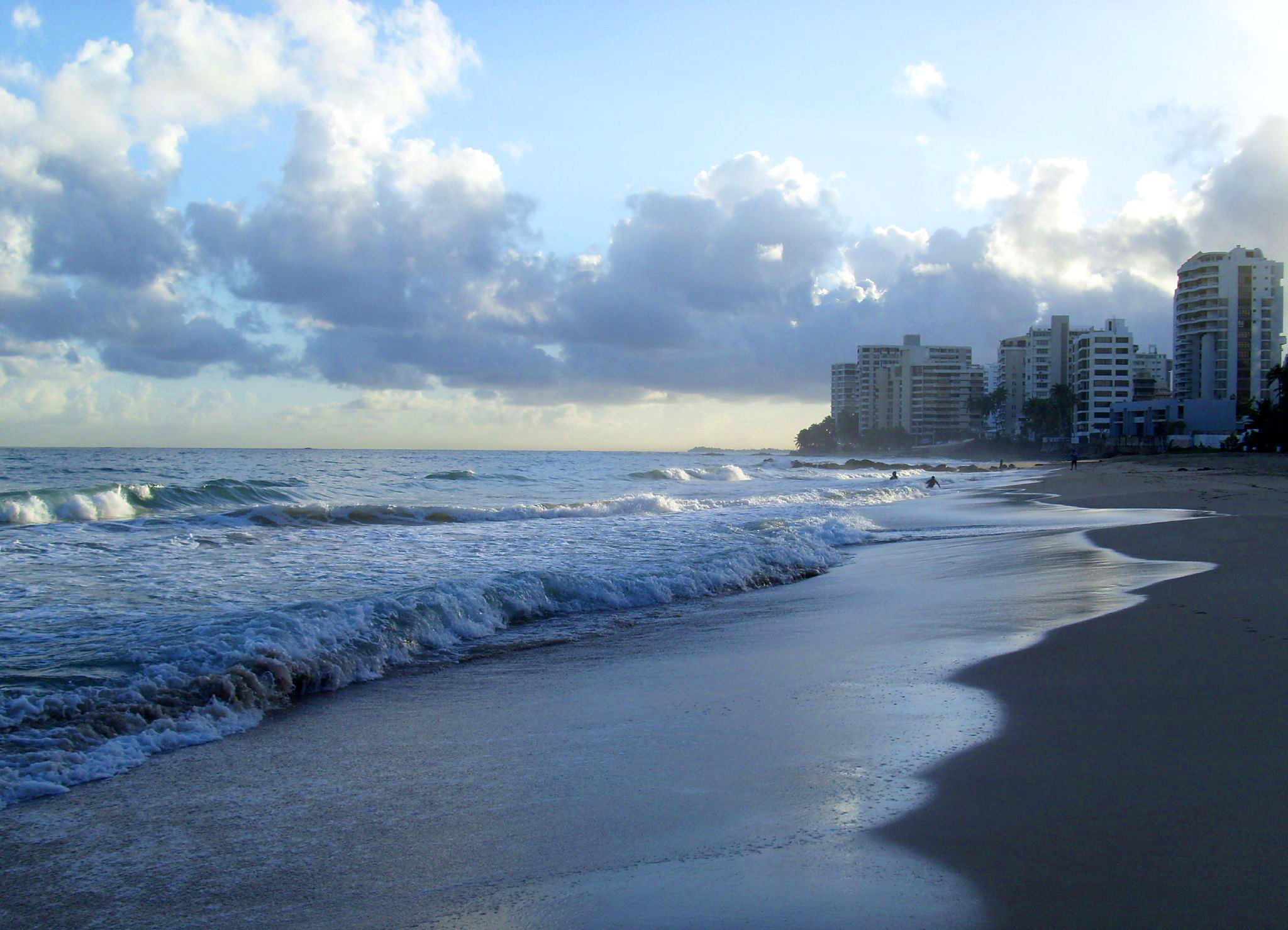
Condado Beach, San Juan, Puerto Rico

Oil was present at many beach areas surrounding the spill site. Beaches near the immediate site of the spill were closed to all visitors, either because of the presence of heavy oil or cleanup efforts. While other beaches in the surrounding areas did have some oil, they were left open to visitors. People were strongly discouraged from visiting these open beaches, though. Tourists and residents that continued to visit oil-affected beaches were not able to use the beach normally due to the presence of oil. Beach goers reported damaged swimming gear as well as headaches that were caused by the oil fumes.

The San Juan National Historic Site was also affected after the spill. Due to its close proximity to the water, intense oil vapors were present inside of the fort located at the site for up to three weeks following the spill. National Park Service workers reported that the fumes were strong enough to induce headaches.

The fishing industry was also affected by the spill. Both recreational and commercial fishing are vital parts of Puerto Rico's economy. Fishing was not able to be done in oil-covered waters. This resulted in the loss of potential charter fishing trips and seafood sales. Normal fishing operations were able to eventually resume once the cleanup was complete.

Due to the lack of appropriate data, it is impossible to determine the exact amount of tourism dollars that were lost because of the spill. It is reasonable to infer, though, that the negative results of the spill felt in these tourist areas did indeed deter some tourists from visiting Puerto Rico. The negative societal impacts described in this section were all caused by negative ecological impacts.

== Effects on wildlife ==
In the days following the incident, 5,268 organisms, the majority of which were dead, were estimated to have washed ashore. Many live organisms were also found both on- and off-shore covered in oil. Of the 5,268 organisms, 152 species were picked up after the spill by scientists and volunteers from the Caribbean Stranding Network (CSN) and various other organizations. These organisms were both living and dead. Organisms found were sponges, anemones, sea worms, crustaceans, mollusks, sea stars, sea urchins, fish, birds, and sea turtles.

=== Biological resources in the spill area ===
Several different biological resources were present in the initial areas affected by the spill. Some of these include the sandy-intertidal invertebrate communities, rocky-intertidal invertebrate communities, and coastal and offshore communities of fish (many of which held much importance to commercial and recreational fishing). Many endangered and protected marine mammals also used the affected areas during their times of migration. Some of these mammals include the West Indian manatee, several species of dolphins, humpback whales, and sperm whales. Even though these species of whales frequented the spill area, no whales were observed to have been affected by the oil. Three species of endangered sea turtles (the green turtle, the hawksbill turtle, and the leatherback turtle) also frequently nested in the affected areas. The situation for these turtles was critical after the spill, as the turtle nesting season was to begin in the months following the spill. Several endangered and threatened species of birds also used areas surrounding the spill to rest and feed. These species of birds include the royal tern, sandwich tern, common tern, roseale tern, least tern, brown pelican, magnificent frigatebird, Audubon shearater, American coot, white-checked pintail, osprey, and the peregrine falcon. All of the endangered and threatened species listed, plus other non-threatened species, were affected in some way by the spill. Most of the species affected were in the immediate landing site of the barge. Many species at the sinking site of the barge were also affected. Many of these species resided in areas of high ecological value, such as the shores of the Pinones State Forest.

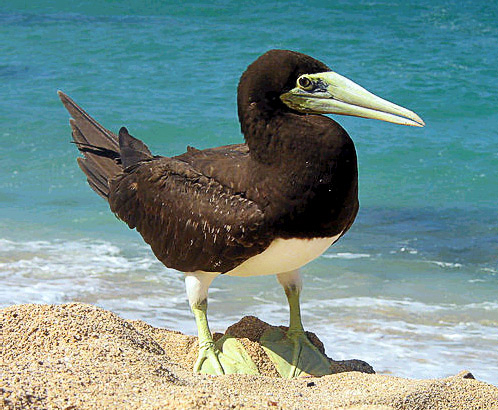
The brown booby, a bird that was present at the spill site

=== Most affected species ===
The Sally Lightfoot crab, periwinkles of genus Littorina, the common West Indian chiton Chiton tuberculatus, the rock-boring urchin, and the brown booby were the most affected species after the spill. The Sally Lightfoot crab was the most affected crustacean after the spill. This crustacean was the most affected because it was the most abundant of all crustaceans in the area. The Sally Lightfoot crab is prominent in the Caribbean as well as the west coast of the United States. The periwinkle and the common West Indian chiton were the most affected of the mollusks observed after the spill. Of all sea urchins observed after the spill, the rock-boring urchin fared the worst. Rock-boring urchins were the most affected organism compared to all observed species after the spill, as they accounted for 29% of all recorded affected species. Of all birds observed after the spill, the brown booby was the most affected. The main reason that most of these species were the most affected after the spill was simply because they were the most abundant species located in the spill area. Only 63% of the sea turtles and birds that were treated after the spill survived.

== Legal response ==
The owners of the Morris J. Berman initially assumed responsibility for the spill, but the ten million dollars that was provided from their insurance policy for oil spill cleanup was quickly spent. The federal government provided funding for the spill on January 14 and it became a United States Coast Guard directed response.

The Governments of Puerto Rico, the United States, and other groups, sued the owners of the two vessels for clean up costs and natural resource damages. Criminal prosecutions were brought against the owners of the two vessels due to issues of crew negligence and the act of knowingly sending a vessel to sea in an unseaworthy condition. The three owners of the barge were charged with criminal negligence based on laws from the Oil Pollution Act of 1990. One of the barge managers and the captain and first mate of the 'Emily S' were also charged with felonies for violations of the Clean Water Act. The court case was officially settled on January 19. The Governments of Puerto Rico and the United States were paid a total of $83.5 million from Metlife Capital Corp, Water Quality Insurance Syndicate and Caribbean Petroleum Corporation. The cargo that was spilled from the Berman was owned by the Caribbean Petroleum Corporation.

== Environmental response ==
=== Treatment of wildlife ===
After the spill, as a part of the Local Spill Response Plan for Puerto Rico and the US Virgin Islands, the CSN was sent out to document damages to biological resources and to prevent further damages to the environment and living organisms. The CSN collected many organisms, both live and dead, after the spill in order to document the damage done to them and to treat as many of the living organisms as possible. Most of the organisms collected by this group were off of the north shore of Puerto Rico, but some were recovered from the south, east, and west shores of Puerto Rico, as well as near the shores of Isla Culebrita and Isla de Vieques.

Collected living wildlife were brought to a temporary triage facility where crabs, birds, and sea turtles were treated for oil contamination and other injuries. Of all animals collected, only these ones were able to be treated. Animals that were not able to be treated were either too small or in too bad of a condition. Nearly 400 crabs that were brought to the facility were successfully treated and released. 28 birds and two sea turtles were also brought to the facility, where 19 were successfully treated and released, and 11 died during treatment. All affected organisms were held until they were deemed completely healthy by a veterinarian. The oiled birds and turtles required an average 30 days of treatment before being released. These organisms were treated with doses of olive oil and non-steroid antibiotics before they were cleaned, in order to provide relief from the effects of the toxic oil. Solutions of olive oil, Simple Green, and BioSolve were then used to clean the organisms in tubs filled with lukewarm water. The organisms were then rinsed and dried.

=== Cleanup of oil ===
Over 1,000 workers from 15 agencies and groups came together after the spill to clean up affected areas. In total, the workers put in over 1.5 million man hours of work. The complete cleanup and assessment of the spill took 114 days.

Eight days after the spill, on January 15, the barge was towed to an area 37 km (23 miles) northeast of San Juan and intentionally sunk under government supervision to a depth of 2 km (1.2 miles) in an underwater canyon, where it is still located today. This decision was ultimately made after it was determined that transporting the remaining oil off of the barge would not be feasible. The barge was sunk at an isolated site that does not experience much ship traffic to avoid further damage. The cleaning of the majority of the oil was completed by April 1994. The cost of the cleanup amounted to approximately $130 million.

The general consensus among several newspaper articles and reports is that the overall response to the spill was a success, as based on the parameters set forth by the Oil Pollution Act of 1990. Despite the overall success of the cleanup, though, it was found that there were several areas for improvement. One glaring example of possible improvement was the actions of the crew of the Emily S. The crew did not have proper supplies and were not properly trained to deal with the situation that they were faced with. The cable that broke during the incident was in a severe case of disrepair and had broken once five months prior to the spill. A new cable was supposed to be installed, and if one had been, the spill could have been avoided. The crew also did not have sufficient supplies on board their vessel to properly repair the broken line. It was also found in federal investigations following the spill that negligent behavior was encouraged aboard the Emily S. This made it obvious that the crews of oil-carrying vessels needed to be properly trained and equipped.

Unlike the crew aboard the Emily S., the governments of the United States and Puerto Rico were well prepared to deal with the spill. The two countries also met most of the requirements that were set forth by the Oil Pollution Act of 1990. For example, a spill response plan for the area had been developed and it was executed to near-perfection. Millions of dollars of oil cleanup equipment was already stationed in Puerto Rico and was deployed into action within a matter of hours after the spill. However, despite the overall success of Puerto Rico's oil spill response plans, there were still some areas for improvement. For example, there were some mechanical failures with some skimmer boats, inappropriate use of oil soaking materials, and an insufficient number of properly-trained personnel. There were also problems with communication between agencies as well as some organizational issues during the cleanup process. The Berman spill served as a field test of how well the plans set forth by the Oil Pollution Act of 1990 worked, and provided examples of how future spill response efforts could be improved. Some of the things learned during this spill affected response efforts for future spills such as the BP Oil Spill in the Gulf of Mexico in 2010.

== See also ==
- List of oil spills
