= Petroleum refining in the United Kingdom =

Petroleum refining in the United Kingdom produced around 51.45 million tonnes of petroleum products in 2023, down 16% from 2015 and 32% from 2011. There are four major and one minor petroleum refinery in the downstream sector of the UK oil industry.

- Phillips 66, Humber Refinery, South Killingholme, 221,000 barrels per day
- Essar Energy plc., Stanlow refinery, 190,000 barrels per day
- Valero Energy Corp., Pembroke refinery, 270,000 barrels per day
- ExxonMobil, Fawley refinery, 270,000 barrels per day
- Haltermann Carless, Harwich refinery, 0.5 million tonnes per year (10,500 barrels per day)

Total operational refining capacity is 1,222,800 barrels per day, around 58 million tonnes per year.

== History ==
In 1902, there were four petroleum refineries in London that held a licence to import oil in barges along the River Thames, including S. Bowley and Son. There was small-scale oil refining along the Lower Thames estuary in 1914. Refining capacity increased during the inter-war period. By 1938 there were 11 oil refineries in the UK.

UK oil refineries 1938
| Company | Plant | Year completed | Capacity in 1937/8, tonnes per year |
|---|---|---|---|
| Esso Petroleum Co Ltd | Fawley, Hampshire | 1951 | 700,000 |
| Shell | Stanlow, Cheshire | 1924 | 750,000 |
| Anglo-Saxon Petroleum Co/ Shell UK Ltd | Shell Haven, Essex | 1916 | 800,000 |
| London and Thames Haven Oil Wharves Ltd | Shell Haven, Essex | 1921 | 400,000 |
| Cory Brothers Ltd | Coryton, Essex | 1921 | 250,000 |
| Shell UK Ltd | Ardrossan, South Ayrshire | 1928 | 225,000 |
| Anglo-Iranian Oil Co | Llandarcy, Neath Port Talbot | 1921 | 360,000 |
| Anglo-Iranian Oil Co | Grangemouth, Falkirk | 1924 | 360,000 |
| Berry Wiggins & Co Ltd | Kingsnorth, Kent | 1930 | 70,000 |
| Burmah Oil Trading Ltd | Ellesmere Port, Cheshire | 1934 | 100,000 |
| William Briggs & Sons Ltd | Dundee | 1935 | 35,000 |

In 1937/8 total refining oil capacity in the UK was 4.21 million tonnes per year, by 1954 this had increased to 26.64 million tonnes.

In the post-Second World War period several of the existing refineries were expanded and 3 new major oil refineries were built.

New major post-war oil refineries
| Company | Plant | Year completed | Capacity in 1955, tonnes per year |
|---|---|---|---|
| Shell UK Ltd | Heysham, Lancashire | 1948 | 1,800,000 |
| BP Refinery Ltd | Isle of Grain, Kent | 1953 | 4,600,000 |
| Vacuum oil Co/Mobil Oil Co Ltd | Coryton, Essex | 1953 | 1,000,000 |

In 1964 the following refineries were operating or being constructed or planned.

Coastal Oil Refineries in Great Britain 1964
| Refinery | Acreage | Company | Capacity (1,000 tons) | Terminal location | Tanker size (1,000 dead weight tons) |
|---|---|---|---|---|---|
| Shell Haven | 1,000 | Shell | 8,900 | Shell Haven, Thames Estuary | 80 |
| Coryton | 300 | Mobil | 2,400 | Coryton, Thames Estuary | 53 |
| Isle of Gain / BP Kent | 1,300 | BP | 9,500 | Isle of Grain, Medway | 50 |
| Kingsnorth | – | Berry Wiggins | 195 | Medway | |
| Fawley | 1,000 | Esso | 11,500 | Southampton Water | 100 |
| Llandarcy | 900 | BP | 5,500 | Angle Bay | 100 |
| Milford Haven | – | Esso | 4,800 | Swansea | 20 |
| Stanlow | 2,000 | Shell | 10,400 | Milford Haven | 100 |
| Ellesmere Port | 100 | Lobitos | 400 | Stanlow, Manchester Ship Canal | 15 |
| Heysham | 124 | Shell | 2,000 | Heysham | 22 |
| Ardrossan | 30 | Shell | 180 | Ardrossan | 14 |
| Dundee | – | William Briggs | 60 | Dundee | 15 |
| Grangemouth | 400 | BP | 3,250 | Finnart, Loch Long Grangemouth, Forth | 100 16 |
| Pumpherston | – | BP | 180 | None | |
New refineries under construction or planned
| North Tees | – | ICI | 146 | Tees | – |
| Milford Haven | 924 | Regent | 5,000 | Milford Haven | 100 |
| Teesport | 300 | Shell | 4,000 | Tees | 63 |

By 1973 the following refineries were in operation.

UK oil refineries 1973
| Company | Plant | Year completed | Capacity in 1973, thousand tonnes per year |
|---|---|---|---|
| Esso Petroleum Co Ltd | Fawley refinery, Hampshire | 1921 | 19,500 |
| Esso Petroleum Co Ltd | Milford Haven refinery, Pembrokeshire | 1960 | 6,300 |
| Shell UK Ltd | Stanlow refinery, Cheshire | 1924 | 10,750 |
| Shell UK Ltd | Shell Haven refinery, Essex | 1916 | 10,000 |
| Shell UK Ltd | Teesport refinery, Teesside | 1968 | 6,000 |
| Shell UK Ltd | Heysham refinery, Lancashire | 1948 | 2,200 |
| Shell UK Ltd | Ardrossan refinery, South Ayrshire | 1928 | 200 |
| BP Refinery Ltd | Isle of Grain refinery, Kent | 1953 | 10,900 |
| BP Refinery Ltd | Llandarcy refinery, Neath Port Talbot | 1921 | 8,300 |
| BP Refinery Ltd | Grangemouth refinery, Falkirk | 1924 | 8,800 |
| BP Refinery Ltd | Belfast refinery | 1964 | 1,500 |
| Mobil Oil Co Ltd | Coryton refinery, Essex | 1953 | 7,000 |
| Lindsey Oil Refinery Ltd | Killingholme, North Lincolnshire | 1969 | 8,400 |
| Texaco Refining Co Ltd | Pembroke refinery, Pembrokeshire | 1964 | 7,000 |
| Phillips-Imperial Petroleum Ltd | Billingham refinery, Teesside | 1963 | 5,000 |
| Amoco | Milford Haven refinery, Pembrokeshire | 1973 | 4,000 |
| Conoco Ltd | South Killingholme refinery, Lincolnshire | 1969 | 4,000 |
| Gulf Oil Refining Ltd | Milford Haven, Pembrokeshire | 1968 | 5,000 |
| Philmac Oils Ltd | Eastham refinery, Cheshire | 1966 | 400 |
| Berry Wiggins & Co Ltd | Kingsnorth refinery, Kent | 1930 | 285 |
| Burmah Oil Trading Ltd | Ellesmere Port refinery, Cheshire | 1934 | 1,500 |
| William Briggs & Sons Ltd | Dundee refinery | 1935 | 85 |
| Carless | Harwich refinery, Essex | 1964 | |

In 1973, with an anticipated increase in consumption and the projected start of oil production from the UK North Sea, the following new refineries were being planned or constructed.

UK planned new refineries 1973
| Company | Plant | Capacity, thousand tonnes per year | Planned completion |
|---|---|---|---|
| ENI/Murco | Canvey Island, Essex | 4,000 | 1977 |
| Occidental | Canvey Island, Essex | 6,000 | Mid 1975 |
| Burmah-Total | Cliffe, Kent | 12,000 | No date |
| Chevron | Hunterston, Scotland | 7,000 | No date |
| ORSI | Hunterston, Scotland | 24,000 | No date |
| Berry Wiggins | Kingsnorth, Kent | 5,000 | 1978 |
| Amoco | Milford Haven, Pembrokeshire | 4,000 | Late 1973 |
| National Bulk Carriers | Nigg Bay, Cromarty Firth | Not known | No date |
| Milford Argosy | Shetland Islands | 15,000 | No date |

Following the oil crisis of 1973-4 refining capacity, and the number of oil refineries, was reduced, and many planned refineries were discontinued. In 1976 there were 17 oil refineries in the UK. By 2000 there were 12 refineries namely:

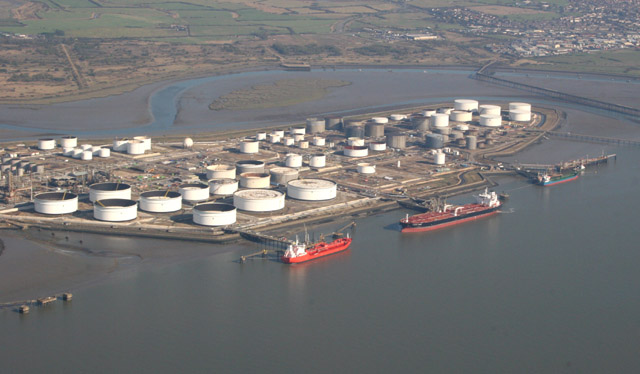
Coryton Oil Refinery

- BP Amoco, Coryton refinery (later Petroplus, closed 2012)
- Carless, Harwich refinery (now Haltermann Carless)
- Phillips 66, Humber refinery
- Total, Lindsey refinery (Prax from 2021, closed 2025)
- Petroplus, North Tees refinery (closed 2012)
- BP Amoco, Grangemouth refinery (PetroIneos from 2004)
- Nynas, Dundee refinery (closed 2013)
- Shell/Nynas, Eastham refinery (bitumen) (closed after 2010)
- Shell Stanlow refinery (Essar Energy from 2011)
- Amoco, then Murco, Milford Haven refinery (closed 2015)
- Texaco, Pembroke refinery (Valero from 2011)
- Esso, Fawley refinery

Further oil company re-organisations and take-overs, and reductions in demand, led to further refinery closures. By 2019 there were 6 major and one smaller oil refineries in the UK.

=== Timeline of UK refinery closures ===
A timeline of the closure of UK oil refineries is summarised in the following table. Adapted from Fuel Oil News.

Closed refineries
| Decade | Owner or operator | Name or location |
|---|---|---|
| 1970s | Shell | Heysham |
| 1980s | BP | Belfast |
| 1980s | Burmah, Essar | Stanlow |
| 1980s | Burmah | Ellesmere Port |
| 1980s | Esso | Milford Haven |
| 1980s | BP | Isle of Grain (Kent) |
| 1980s | BP | Llandarcy |
| 1980s | Shell | Teesport |
| 1990s | Gulf | Milford Haven |
| 1990s | Shell | Shellhaven |
| 2000s | Phillips | Teesside |
| 2010s | Mobil, BP, Petroplus | Coryton |
| 2010s | Petroplus | North Tees, Cleveland |
| 2010s | Nynas | Dundee |
| 2010s | Shell | Earlham |
| 2010s | Amoco, Elf, Total, Murco | Milford Haven |
| 2020s | BP, Petroineos | Grangemouth |
| 2020s | Prax | Lindsey Oil Refinery, North Killingholme |

== Organisations ==
Statistics for petroleum refining in the UK were formerly gathered by the UK Petroleum Industry Association (UKPIA), on Chancery Lane in London, and the former Department for Business, Energy and Industrial Strategy.

The Institute of Petroleum merged with the Institute of Energy to form the Energy Institute in 2003. The modern-day institute is headquartered in Marylebone, London. Also nearby is the World Petroleum Council (WPC), known for its four-yearly World Petroleum Congresses.

== See also ==
- Category:Oil refineries in the United Kingdom
- Oil terminals in the United Kingdom
