= Fuels Industry UK =

Corporate body

- Formerly: UK Petroleum Industry Association
- Founded: August 2023
- Headquarters: London, United Kingdom
- Area served: United Kingdom
- Key people: See text
- Products: Petroleum, petroleum fuels, biofuels, liquefied natural gas,
- Members: See text
- Website: www.fuelsindustryuk.org

Fuels Industry UK is a trade body that represents the interests of its constituent member oil companies in the downstream oil and gas industry in the United Kingdom. From 1979 to 2023 it was known as the UK Petroleum Industry Association (UKPIA). UKPIA was dissolved and reconstituted as Fuels Industry UK in August 2023, to better reflect the development of biofuels.

== Corporate membership ==
When Fuels Industry UK was established in August 2023 there were eight oil company members:

- BP
- EET
- ExxonMobil
- Petroineos
- Phillips 66
- Prax
- Shell UK Ltd
- Valero

In addition there were eight Associate Members:

- Absl
- Fulcrum
- bpa, formerly British Pipeline Agency
- Local Fuel
- Coryton
- National Grid
- Dragon LNG
- Exolum

Member companies operate six major oil refineries in the UK, and source 93 per cent of transport fuels. They also own and operate 1,252 filling stations. The associate members include heating fuel suppliers, Liquified Natural Gas (LNG) imports, terminals, pipelines and renewable energies.

== Governance and staff ==
Fuels Industry UK is governed by a Council (Board of directors) which comprises senior representatives nominated by the members. The Council meets regularly and sets the strategy for Fuels Industry UK, as well as monitoring delivery of the organisation’s objectives.

Key staff (2024) include:

- Elizabeth de Jong, chief executive officer
- Jamie Baker, Director of External Relations
- Peter Webb, Policy Director
- Chris Gould, Energy Transition Lead
- Simon Wood, Environment, Health and Safety
- Bruce Rothberg, Government Affairs
- Alana Hepburn, Communications
- Dr Daniel Greenblatt, Energy Transition Analyst

== Publications ==
Fuels Industry UK publishes an annual Fuel Statistics Report. This includes an analysis of the fuel market and political and economic contexts, including greenhouse gas emissions.

== See also ==
- Offshore Energies UK
- Institute of Petroleum
- Energy Institute
- Oil and gas industry in the United Kingdom
- Oil terminals in the United Kingdom
- Petroleum refining in the United Kingdom
