= Heysham Refinery =

Former oil refinery in Lancashire, England

Heysham refinery
- Interactive map of Heysham refinery
- Location: Heysham Lancashire, United Kingdom; 54°01′27″N 2°53′13″W

Refinery details
- Operator: Trimpell Limited (1941-46), Shell (1948-76)
- Owners: Air Ministry (1939-46), Shell (1948-76)
- Opened: 1941
- Closed: 1976
- Capacity: 2 million tonnes per year
- No. of employees: 200 (1959) 100 (1971)

Heysham oil refinery was located between Heysham and Middleton on the Heysham peninsula, Lancashire. It was built during the Second World War to produce (from 1941 to 1946) high octane fuel for combat aircraft. It was later adapted to refine crude oil with a processing capacity of two million tonnes per year and was in operation from 1948 to 1976. It worked in conjunction with a chemical plant which produced ammonium nitrate fertilizer and other products, using feedstocks from the refinery.

== History ==
=== Fuels ===
Heysham Aviation Fuel Works was established north of the village of Middleton by the Air Ministry in Spring 1939 in anticipation of the forthcoming war. The location was thought to be at the limit of the range of enemy bombers. The works were designed to produce high octane aviation fuel for the Royal Air Force (RAF). The construction and operation of the plant was supervised by a joint venture company called Trimpell Limited consisting of Trinidad Leaseholders Limited, Imperial Chemical Industries (ICI) and Royal Dutch-Shell. The name ‘Trimpell’ being formed of initials from the three companies. At the same time Trimpell Limited planned the construction of two further fuel plants in Trinidad to provide a diversity of supply and reduce the risk of loss of production by air raids, but these were not built.

Bulk supply contracts for high octane fuel were placed by the Air Ministry with manufacturers, and fuel was put into widespread use by the RAF. At Heysham fuel was produced by the hydrogenation of imported gas oil delivered via a jetty off Heysham Harbour. The plant was designed to produce 300,000 tons per year of petrol and 50,000 tons per year of iso-octane manufactured from butane produced by the hydrogenation process. The iso-octane was used directly as a 100-octane fuel and was also used to enrich 87-octane fuel. Initially, the limited quantities of the 100-octane fuel in the national stockpile required rationing until supplies increased to meet the demand. From March 1940 the RAF converted the Spitfire’s Rolls-Royce Merlin engines to use the 100-octane fuel to improve the aircraft's flying capabilities. The 100-octane fuel was dyed green to distinguish it from the 87-octane fuel which was dyed blue.

In addition to the production of fuel products, ICI built an ammonium nitrate fertilizer plant adjacent to the refinery in 1940. The feedstock for the fertilizer plant was naphtha from the refinery.

=== Wartime production ===
Production of hydro-petrol from Heysham started in 1941 and iso-octane in October that year. In August 1941 Trimpell decided to run the plant at Heysham to produce two-thirds aviation spirit and one-third ammonia production. Ammonia, a precursor of ammonium nitrate for fertilizer, was produced by hydrogenating nitrogen.

In 1944 Heysham imported as feedstock and furnace fuel 466,000 tons of oil; 204,000 tons of coke; and 100,000 tons of coal. It also required a large amount of electricity; a 132 kV high voltage electricity supply from the national grid was built. In 1944 Heysham produced 344,000 tons of petrol, 55,000 tons of iso-octane, and 22,000 tons of ammonia. The oil products from the refinery, and fertilizer from the chemical plant, were distributed by road, rail and sea. There were extensive loading facilities and sidings across the site, amounting to 17 miles of railway tracks. These were connected to the national rail network via the Morecambe to Heysham line. The Heysham aviation fuel refinery operated from 1941 to 1946 when production ceased. In 1948 the Government sold the plant to Trimpell Limited and its constituent companies.

== Heysham refinery ==
From 1948 Heysham oil refinery was owned by Royal Dutch-Shell which operated as Shell Refining Company. The original refinery plant was converted to process crude oil, with the addition of three distillation units. Each unit had a capacity of 2000 tons per day. The capacity of the refinery was around two million tons per year of crude oil throughout its operational life, see table.

Heysham refinery capacity
Year	Capacity, million tonnes per year
1948	0.5
1950	1.8
1955	1.8
1960	1.8
1963	2.0
1964	2.0
1965	1.95
1969	1.95
1972	2.2
1974	2.2
1976	Closed

Initially the capacity of Heysham refinery was comparable to other Shell Oil refineries built in the immediate post-war period such as Stanlow (1.2 million tonnes per year in 1950) and Shell Haven (2.0 million tonnes per year in 1950). However, these other refineries were further developed in subsequent years: by 1960 Stanlow had increased to 5.25 million tonnes per year, and Shell Haven to 8.05 million tonnes per year, whereas the capacity of Heysham remained unchanged.

Upon assuming ownership Shell decommissioned the iso-octane plants, however the dehydrogenation plant was converted to catalytic desulfurisation to treat Iraqi gasoline. The catalytic treating reactor had a capacity of 570 tons/day and operated at 42 psi, 495 °C at the inlet and 22 psi, 555 °C at the outlet. The revamping of the original plant was completed by November 1948.

The tank farm also needed extensive reconfiguration. During the war gasoline had left by road, rail and sea. But given the peace-time conditions, the greater throughput (4,500 tons /day compared to 1,500 tons/d during the war), and the remote location of Heysham the distribution of gasoline, gas oil and fuel oil by road and rail was only marginally economic. Bulk sea transportation had an economic advantage but there was only a single handling berth at Heysham harbour. Gasoline loading facilities for road and rail had been part of the original plant and were used for the new plant. Gas oil was distributed by sea. Fuel oil was exported by rail from two 5,000 ton storage tanks. The run-down line from the tanks to the rail loading gantry was 3,700 ft long (1,128 m). To prevent solidification in cold weather a second line allowed fuel oil to be circulated back to the heated storage tanks.

The refinery was initially supplied with crude oil from 18,000 ton tankers offloaded at Heysham Harbour. In 1966 a pipeline was commissioned from Shell's Tranmere crude oil import terminal to the refinery. The pipeline was 70 miles (112.7 km) long and 30 cm in diameter and had a capacity of two million tons per year.

In 1969 Shell-BP opened a bulk liquid distribution centre at Haydock, Lancashire. This was supplied with light oils via a 41.6 km pipeline from Stanlow refinery; heavy oils were delivered by two trains per day from Stanlow, and three daily trains from Heysham. The refinery processed mainly North African, Venezuelan and Middle Eastern crudes.

Products from the refinery comprised:

- Gas - used as fuel and sold to Trimpell and ICI as fuel
- LPG Butane - distributed to various users
- Light Distillate Feedstock - sold to ICI
- Gas and diesel - fuel for engines and domestic heating
- Fuel oils - about half of the refinery output: marine fuel oil, medium fuel oil, light fuel oil, and low sulphur oil.

Shell closed Heysham refinery in 1976.

Asbestos was used extensively in the refinery. In 2010 Field Fisher Waterhouse sought information from anyone who had worked at the Heysham Refinery from 1945 to 1960 in relation to a claim about asbestos exposure.

== Chemical works ==
Chemical plants were built during the war to produce nitric acid, ammonia and ammonium nitrate fertiliser. The plant was funded by Ministry of Supply; it was operated by Trimpell Limited and later by ICI.

A case of sabotage was reported in 1958 when after two compressors failed. Investigations revealed that abrasive grinding paste had been introduced into the compressors’ lubricating oil system which damaged the bearings.

Twenty-six members of the Amalgamated Engineering Union went on strike at the fertilizer plant in 1959 over working conditions and pay.

ICI commissioned a new 165 tons per day Nitric Acid plant at Heysham in 1962, as well as a similar ICI plant at Severnside north west of Bristol. The plants used the 'Stamicarbon' process. The contractors for the construction of the plant were Humphreys & Glasgow Limited.

Ammonia production ceased at Heysham in 1977 as production was by then concentrated in larger and more efficient plants in north east England. By the 1970s The ‘Nitrogel’ fertilizer produced at Heysham was unable to compete with ‘Nitran’ developed by ICI in the mid-1960s. The Heysham plant, with a capacity of 500 tons per day, was smaller than the modern plants with a production capability of 1,500 or 2,000 tons per day. By the time ICI closed the plant it had a capacity of 100,000 tons per year.

In 1975 a company called Solrec Limited (Solrec is abbreviated from solvent recovery) purchased part of the refinery site. The company processed and recycled waste materials. Steam distillation was used to recover solvents. In 1984 a new solvent recovery plant was commissioned to provide facilities for the processing of heavily contaminated materials previously rejected as irrecoverable.

In 1996 clouds of solvent fumes from the Solrec chemical works drifted across Heysham golf club causing golfers to abandon their games.

== The sites today ==
The refinery and chemical plants were demolished after closure. The sites have been redeveloped as commercial and industrial premises although much of the land has not been developed. Lancaster City Council has published a summary of the history of the site. The Council designated the area as Heysham Gateway and have produced a Development Plan.

== See also ==
- Heysham nuclear power station
- Petroleum refining in the United Kingdom
- Stanlow refinery
- Tranmere Oil Terminal
- UK oil pipeline network
- Oil terminals in the United Kingdom
