= UK Petroleum Industry Association =

UK trade organisation

- Abbreviation: UKPIA
- Successor: Fuels Industry UK
- Formation: 8 December 1978
- Founder: 13 Oil companies
- Founded at: London
- Dissolved: 17 August 2023
- Type: Nonprofit organisation
- Legal status: Dissolved
- Headquarters: London
- Region served: United Kingdom

The UK Petroleum Industry Association (UKPIA) was a trade body representing downstream companies in the oil and gas sector in the UK.

The trade body's website stated that "we and our members are committed to taking a leadership role in shaping a flexible and resilient fuels future for UK industry and ensuring the downstream fuels sector continues to play a part in tomorrow's sustainable, energy-secure landscape".

In written evidence to Parliament in 2021, UKPIA said that it represents "eight oil refining, distribution and marketing companies that operate the six major oil refineries in the UK and source over 85% of the transport fuels used. UKPIA members also own and operate multiple oil terminals and oil pipelines".

UKPIA published reviews and statistical studies about the downstream oil industries in the UK.

In August 2023 UKPIA was dissolved, and was restructured as Fuels Industry UK

== Membership ==
The thirteen founding members of UKPIA in 1979 were:

- Amoco UK, resigns 1990
- BP Oil,
- Burmah Oil Trading, resigns 1996
- Chevron Oil UK, resigns 1984
- Conoco,
- Esso Petroleum
- Gulf Oil, resigns 1997
- Mobil Oil
- Petrofina UK,
- Phillips Petroleum International,
- Shell UK,
- Texaco,
- Total Oil

As oil companies entered of left the industry or merged and were renamed, the number and names of members of UKPIA changed. In 1980 Elf Oil and Ultramar Golden Eagle joined UKPIA, (Ultramar resigns 1986) Chevron resigned in 1984. Repsol joins1992 resign 1994

in 2002 there were nine members:

- BP Oil UK Ltd.,
- Conoco Ltd.,
- Esso Petroleum Company Ltd.,
- Kuwait Petroleum (GB) Ltd. joins 1993 resigns 2003,
- Murco Petroleum Ltd, joins 1991
- Petroplus UK,
- Shell UK Ltd.,
- Chevron Texaco Ltd.,
- ToralFinaElf UK Ltd.

By 2023 the eight members of UKPIA were:

- Bp.,
- Essar.,
- ExxonMobil.,
- Petroineos.,
- Phillips 66.,
- Prax.,
- Shell UK Ltd.,
- Valero.

In addition in 2023 there were nine Associate Members:

- Absl.,
- Fulcrum.,
- Certas.,
- Local Fuel.,
- Coryton.,
- National grid.,
- Dragon LNG.,
- Oikos.,
- Exolum.

== Directors General ==
During its existence, from 1979 to 2023, UKPIA had six Directors General

- Douglas Harvey 1979 - 1984
- Ian Berwick 1984 - 1995
- Michael Frend 1995 - 2004
- Chris Hunt 2004 - 2017
- Stephen Marcos Jones 2017 - 2022
- Elizabeth de Jong (Chief Executive Officer) 2022 - 2023

== Publication ==
The following publications were published since 2000.

- Fuels Statistics 2023
- Hydrogen Production Factsheet (2022)
- 2022 Statistical Review
- Future Skills for the Downstream Sector (2022)
- The Global Challenge (2021)
- 2021 Statistical Review
- The Future of Mobility in the UK (2021)
- Background on Hydrogen (2021)
- UKPIA Position Paper Response to Energy White Paper (2021)
- UKPIA Position Paper on Rules of Origin (ROO) (2020)
- Transition, Transformation, and Innovation Report (2020)

== Lobbying allegations ==
In February 2022, The Guardian published a report alleging that lobbyists representing fossil fuel giants were running All-Party Parliamentary Groups (APPGs) to give oil producers a voice in parliament without having to declare an interest. The report notes that UKPIA "is playing a key role in the running of the All-Party Parliamentary Group (APPG) on downstream energy and fuels", which gave the association's members access to MPs, for example by hosting presentations by UKPIA members like BP and Phillips 66.

Following an investigation by the Office of the Registrar of Consultant Lobbyists concluded that "Based on assurances given, UKPIA has not conducted consultant lobbying activities."

== See also ==
- Offshore Energies UK
- Institute of Petroleum
- Energy Institute
- Oil and gas industry in the United Kingdom
- Oil terminals in the United Kingdom
- Petroleum refining in the United Kingdom
