= Queen Elizabeth Dock =

Queen Elizabeth Dock may refer to:

- Queen Elizabeth II Dock, Mersey, UK
- Queen Elizabeth Dock, Hull, UK
