= Queen Elizabeth II Dock =

Dock in Merseyside, England

Coordinates: 53.326530°N 2.951254°W

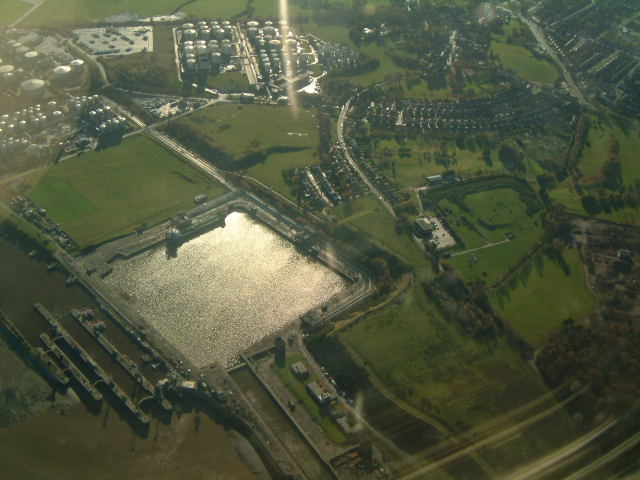
Queen Elizabeth II Dock from the air.

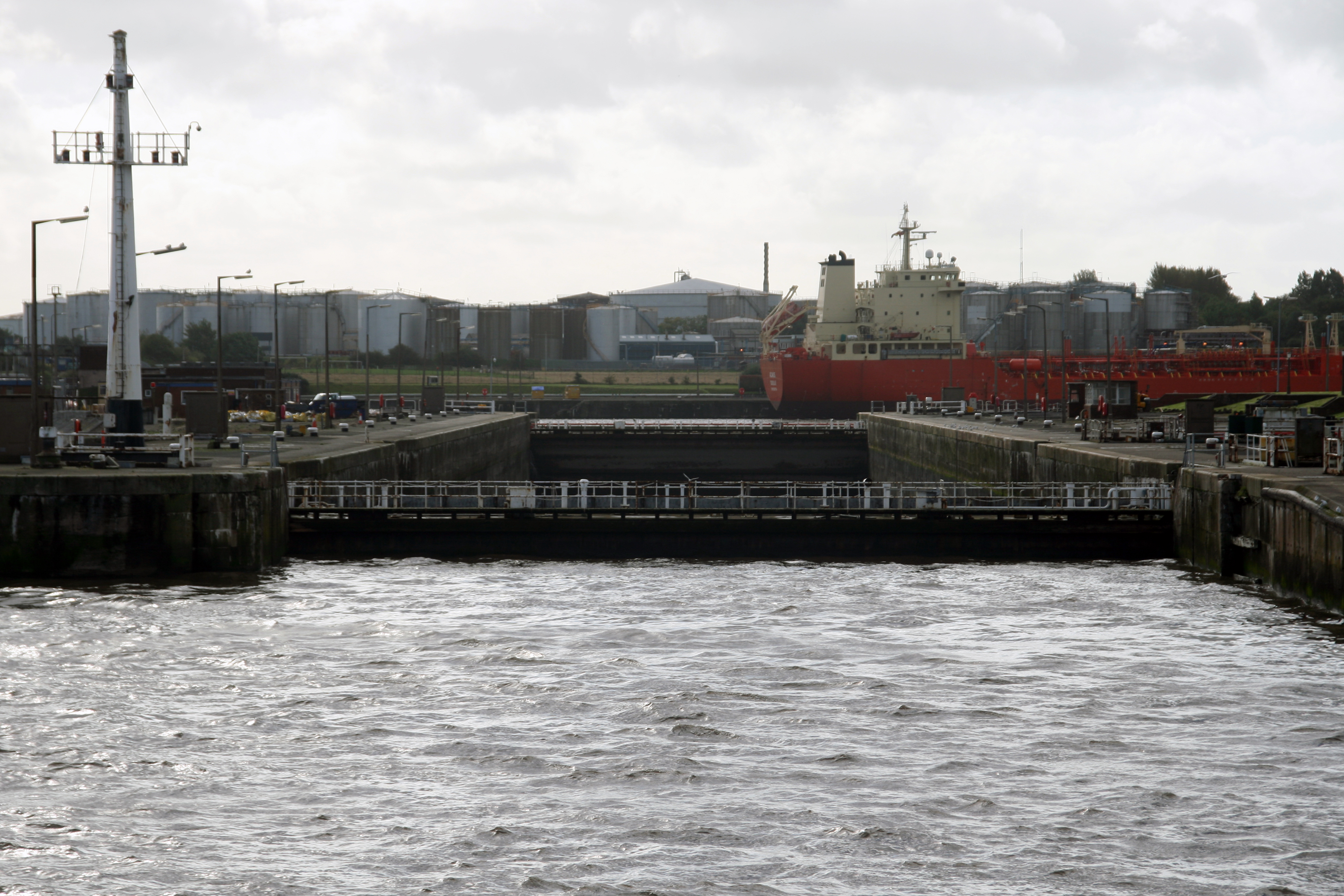
The entrance to the Queen Elizabeth II Dock.

Queen Elizabeth II Dock is a dock situated on the River Mersey at Eastham, in the Metropolitan Borough of Wirral, Merseyside, England.

Construction of the dock began in 1949, adjacent to the entrance of the Manchester Ship Canal at Eastham Locks and opening directly onto the river. The dock was built to provide berthing facilities for large tankers that could not be accommodated on the existing canal due to their size. Simultaneously, Eastham Oil Terminal was built nearby and pipelines were laid to link the dock and storage facility to the Stanlow Oil Refinery near Ellesmere Port. The Queen Elizabeth II Dock became operational on 19 January 1954.

The lock chamber measures 807 by 100 feet (246 by 30 metres) in size with a water depth of 40 feet (12 metres). Two steel gates are located at either end of the lock, with a further gate one third of the way along from the Mersey entrance. These gates open by retracting into the dock wall. The dock itself was constructed with four berths, each capable of handling tankers of up to 30,000 gross tons.

Subsequent increases in tanker size since the dock was built has meant that the largest tankers use the Tranmere Oil Terminal and at offshore berths at Anglesey in North Wales.

As part of the emergency procedures for the Manchester Ship Canal, an emergency siren located at the dock is tested every morning around 0845 and is audible in many parts of South Liverpool and Ellesmere Port.
