= Eastham Oil Terminal =

Coordinates: 53°18′45.16″N 2°56′49.96″W

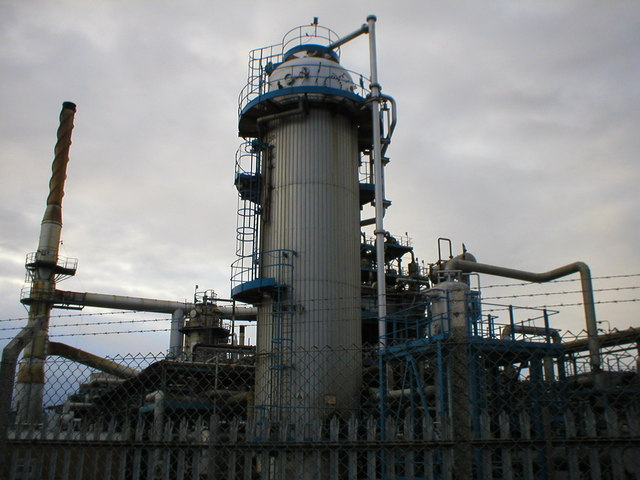
Eastham Oil Terminal.

Eastham Oil Terminal is situated close to the small town of Eastham on the Wirral Peninsula, beside the Manchester Ship Canal. It was commissioned in 1954 close to the Queen Elizabeth II Dock and is a storage and export facility for oil products refined at Stanlow Refinery, to which it is connected by pipeline. The site is currently operated by Nynas.

== History ==
Construction of the Eastham oil terminal began in 1949 in association with the Queen Elizabeth II Dock. These facilities were built near Eastham locks at entrance of the Manchester Ship Canal on the River Mersey. The new facilities at Eastham provided berthing for large tankers unable to access the ship canal. Pipelines were constructed from Stanlow Oil Refinery to the oil terminal and the dock. The construction cost of the terminal £7 million. The facilities became operational in 1954.

Tanker sizes increased rapidly during the 1950s, and as early as 1960 it was recognised that the Eastham terminal was limited as the water there was not deep enough for the 65,000 ton tankers that were then becoming commonplace. This led to the construction of the Tranmere oil terminal further downstream from where crude oil feedstock for Stanlow refinery is offloaded.

== Other facilities ==
Other companies built processing and storage facilities at Eastham. Paktank built a bulk liquid tank farm (53°18'51.5"N 2°57'11.2"W) to the west of the oil terminal. In 1975 Tate & Lyle had a 50% stake in the terminal. The terminal was later owned and operated by NuStar Terminals Eastham Limited. In 2018 Inter Terminals acquired NuStar's European storage terminal business. This facility is currently (2020) operated by Inter Terminals. There are 157 tanks with a total storage capacity of 325,198 m^{3}. There are four jetties for vessels and the terminal receives from, and delivers to, sea and road.

In 2015 there was a proposal by Hydrodec Re-refining (UK) Limited to construct a hazardous waste recovery facility at Power House Road, Eastham comprising a waste oil re-refining plant together with associated development. This has not been developed.

== Eastham refinery ==
A small refinery, Eastham Refinery Ltd., was constructed at Eastham in 1966 to the east of the tank farm. This was a joint venture between Tarmac Ltd. and Phillips Petroleum of America (Phillips 66) and traded under the name of Philmac Oil Ltd. The refinery took heavy naphthenic crude as a feedstock and produced bitumen and other distillate products such as gas oil, marine diesel, lubricating base stocks. The throughput in the 1970s was 400,000 tonnes per year.

In 1989 the unit was expanded to provide a capacity of 1.2 million tonnes per year. Eastham refinery was later operated by Briggs Oil in a joint venture with Shell. Briggs Oil was acquired by the Swedish firm AB Nynas Petroleum in 1992 for £70 million; Shell retained its interest in the plant. In 1992 the refinery comprised a vacuum distillation unit with a capacity of 10,500 barrels/day (1,669 m^{3}/day) producing 8,000 barrels/day (1272 m^{3}/day) of asphalt.

The Energy Institute noted that the refinery closed in 2010. However, Eastham Refinery Ltd still operated a bitumen plant in 2017. The plant produces bitumen by a 2-stage distillation process using crude oil and refinery residues as feedstock. Crude oil is received by pipeline from the nearby Tranmere terminal and the residues by pipeline from the Queen Elizabeth II dock. The raw materials and product are stored in a tank farm on the site. In 2015 the plant processed 978,472 tonnes of feedstock oil. The plant uses a combination of an atmospheric distillation column and a vacuum column to separate oil into various final components.
