= Esso Birmingham Terminal =

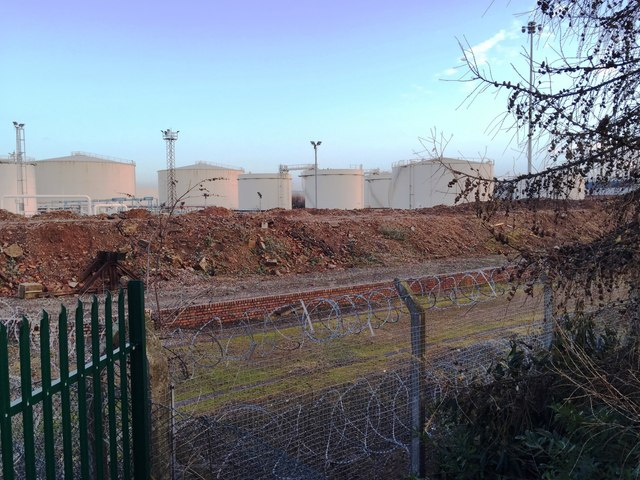
- Interactive map of the Esso Birmingham Terminal area

General information
- Type: Oil storage depot
- Location: Erdington, West Midlands, Wood Lane; Erdington; Birmingham; West Midlands
- Coordinates: 52.5084°N 1.8409°W
- Completed: 1962
- Owner: Esso

Esso Birmingham Terminal is a wholesale diesel and petroleum supply terminal located next to the Fort Shopping Park, on Wood Lane in Erdington, Birmingham, UK. The site is also adjacent to the A47 Fort Parkway, otherwise known locally as the 'Heartlands Spine Road'.

Opened in 1962, the site consists of 17 fuel storage tanks, with a combined capacity of 50,000m³, operating 24 hours a day, 7 days a week. The site used to be serviced by both rail and road up until the mid-2000s, however the rail connection beneath Fort Parkway has now been severed.

In 2014, it was discovered that a major fuel theft had taken place on the pipeline between the Birmingham Terminal, Birmingham Airport and Esso's oil refinery in Fawley, Southampton. The pipeline had been breached near to an industrial unit in West Wellow, Romsey.

== See also ==
- Kingsbury Oil Terminal
- Oil terminals in the United Kingdom
