= Puma Energy =

Swiss oil company

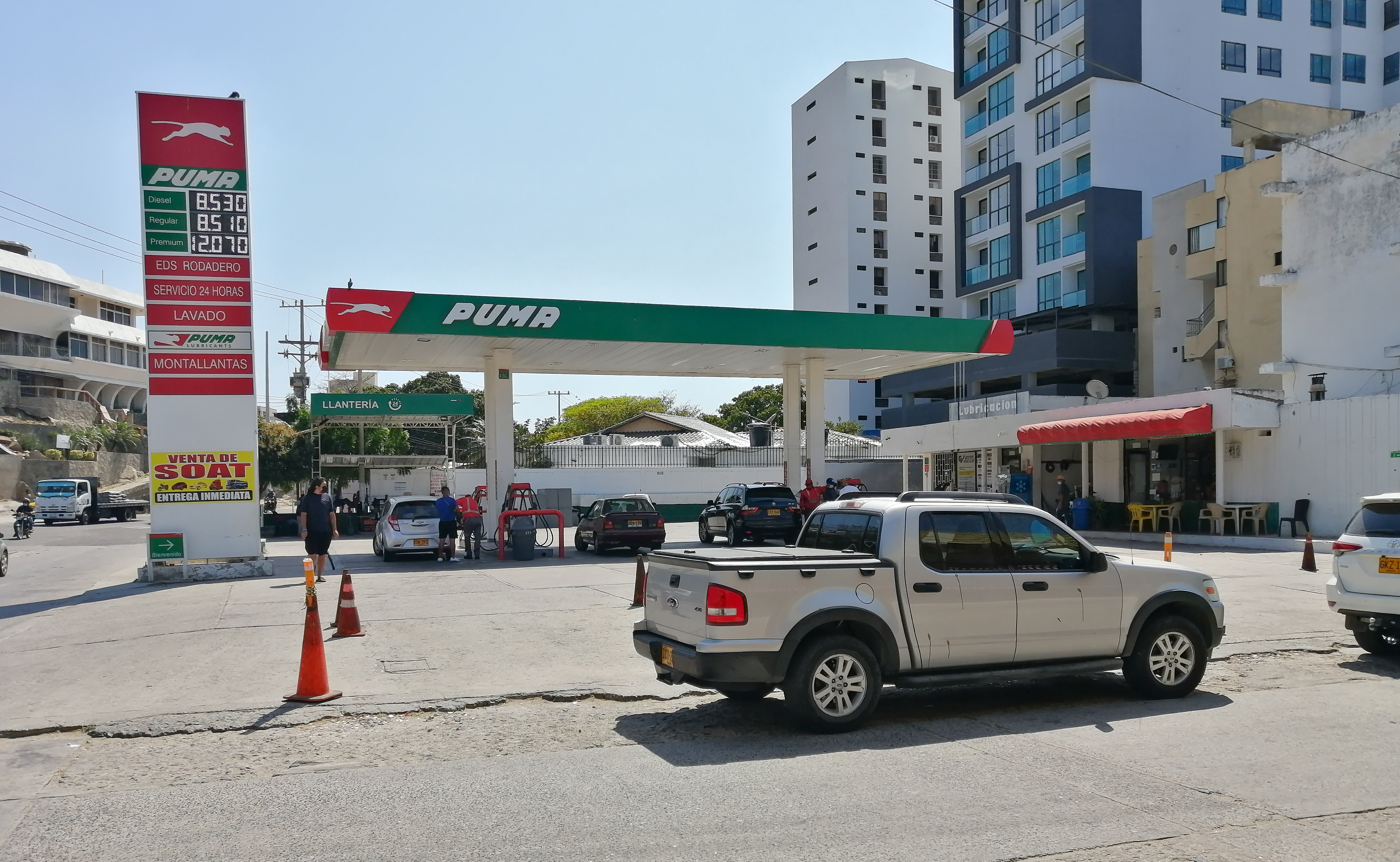
- Puma station at Santa Marta, Colombia in February 2021
- Type: Private
- Industry: Petroleum
- Founded: 1997; 29 years ago
- Headquarters: Singapore
- Area served: Latin America; Africa; Europe; Asia Pacific
- Key people: Jiri Zrust (Chairman); Mark Russell (CEO); Carlos Pons (CFO)
- Products: Gasoline; Lubricants; Aviation fuel; Bitumen; LPG
- Services: Refinery; Fuel distribution and retail; Aviation; Lubricants; Bitumen
- Revenue: US $11,238 million (2025)
- Owner: Trafigura
- Number of employees: 3,800
- Parent: Trafigura
- Subsidiaries: Puma Energy Africa
- Website: pumaenergy.com

Puma Energy is a Swiss multinational mid- and downstream oil company, majority-owned by Singaporean company Trafigura.

Its operations span around 34 countries across five continents and encompass the supply, storage, refining, distribution, and retail of a range of petroleum products.

The firm owns and operates more than 2,200 service stations. The company employs over 3,800 staff and is headquartered in Singapore with regional offices in Geneva, Johannesburg and Panama City.

== History ==
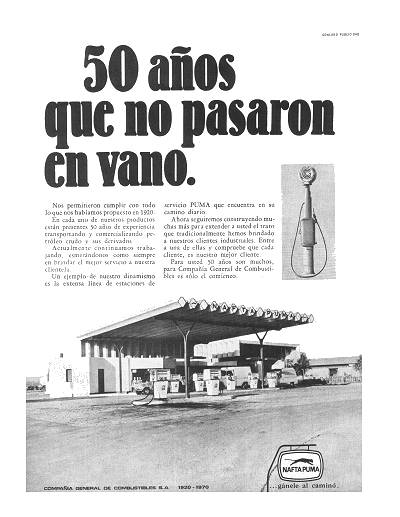
"Nafta Puma" of Argentina advertising, 1970. The brand was established in that country

The Puma brand was created in Argentina in 1929 by "Compañía General de Combustibles S.A." (CGC). CGC was founded in 1920 to transport and market crude oil and its by-products around the country. By the end of the decade, CGC was operating its own-brand service stations in Argentina under the Puma name. Between 1930 and 1996 Puma brand's profile in the Argentinian market increased through an expansion in the number of retail sites and investments in advertising. The Puma brand soon travelled further afield after CGC established Puma service stations in Ecuador, in order to supplement its crude oil exploration activities. In 1994, CGC (then owned by Santiago Soldati's family) merged to other two local oil companies, Astra and Isaura (which had an own refinery in Bahía Blanca), to form a new company, named "Eg3". Nevertheless, the company only lasted two years as a private enterprise so it was acquired by Spanish Repsol (which already owned 33% of Astra after acquiring it for US$360 million) in 1997. Repsol kept the Eg3 brand and stations, but two years later sold the company to Brazilian corporation Petrobras for US$1,000 million. The Brazilian corporation dissolved Eg3, renaming all its stations (a total of 800) as Petrobras.

In 1997, Swiss multinational corporation Trafigura purchased the rights to the Puma brand, ushering in a new phase of development for Puma. The "new" firm was founded in Central America in 1997 as an oil storage and distribution network, and is now active in Latin America, Africa, Europe, Asia, and Australia after exiting the Middle East in 2022. In 2010, the firm announced the acquisition of five retail companies from BP Africa. Since then it has acquired further fuel marketing assets in Central America, the Caribbean, Southeast Asia, and Australia.

On 1 July 2020 Chevron Australia Downstream Pty Ltd, a wholly owned subsidiary of Chevron Corp., announced that it has completed the acquisition from Puma Energy Asia Pacific B.V. of all shares and equity interests of Puma Energy (Australia) Holdings Pty Ltd for the amount of AU$425 million. In April 2021, it was announced that Trafigura control of Puma Energy would increase to over 90% after Angolan company Sonangol Group agreed to sell its stake for US$600 million.

== Operations ==
=== Africa ===
Puma Energy Africa is headquartered in Sandton, South Africa. The firm has operations in sixteen countries in Africa. It entered the African market in Congo-Brazzaville in 2002 before expanding into Ghana. Mozambique, Nigeria, Ivory Coast, the Democratic Republic of Congo, and Angola as one of the largest investors in the sub-Saharan downstream sector.

In September 2011, Puma completed the deal to acquire BP's downstream interests in Namibia (100%), Botswana (100%), Zambia (75%), Malawi (50%) and Tanzania (50%) for US$296 million. The deal handed the company a portfolio of retail assets across the five countries, comprising commercial and aviation fuel, lubricants, over 190 service stations, several storage depots and an import terminal.

The Botswana business accounted for a significant share of the total price and marked the first time the firm had entered a landlocked African country, giving the firm a cross-continental presence from Namibia to Mozambique.

Also in 2010 the firm formed an alliance with Castrol to distribute lubricant brands in the new Southern African markets, as well as Angola and the Democratic Republic of the Congo. In 2012 the firm acquired two 5,000 cubic metres (180,000 cu ft) import terminals for liquefied petroleum gas in Benin and Senegal.

In 2015, Puma expanded its operations in South Africa through the acquisition of Brent Oil and Drakensberg Oil's local retail assets and lubricant business. The company currently operates 95 gas stations in South Africa, making its presence in that sector considerably smaller than competing petroleum companies.

In 2016, Puma Energy delivered its first cargo of bitumen in Nigeria under a joint venture with Wabeco Petroleum Ltd.

=== Latin America ===
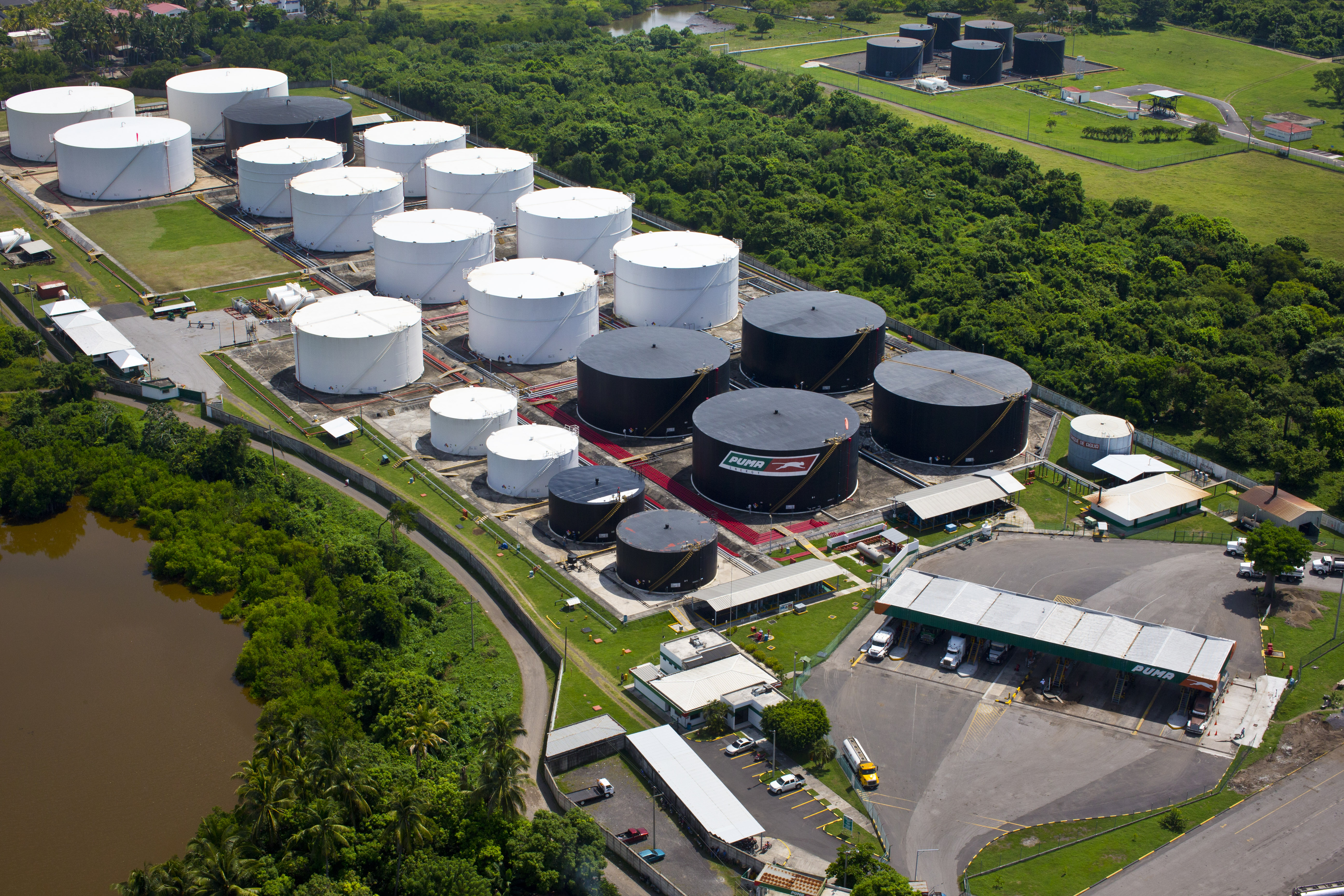
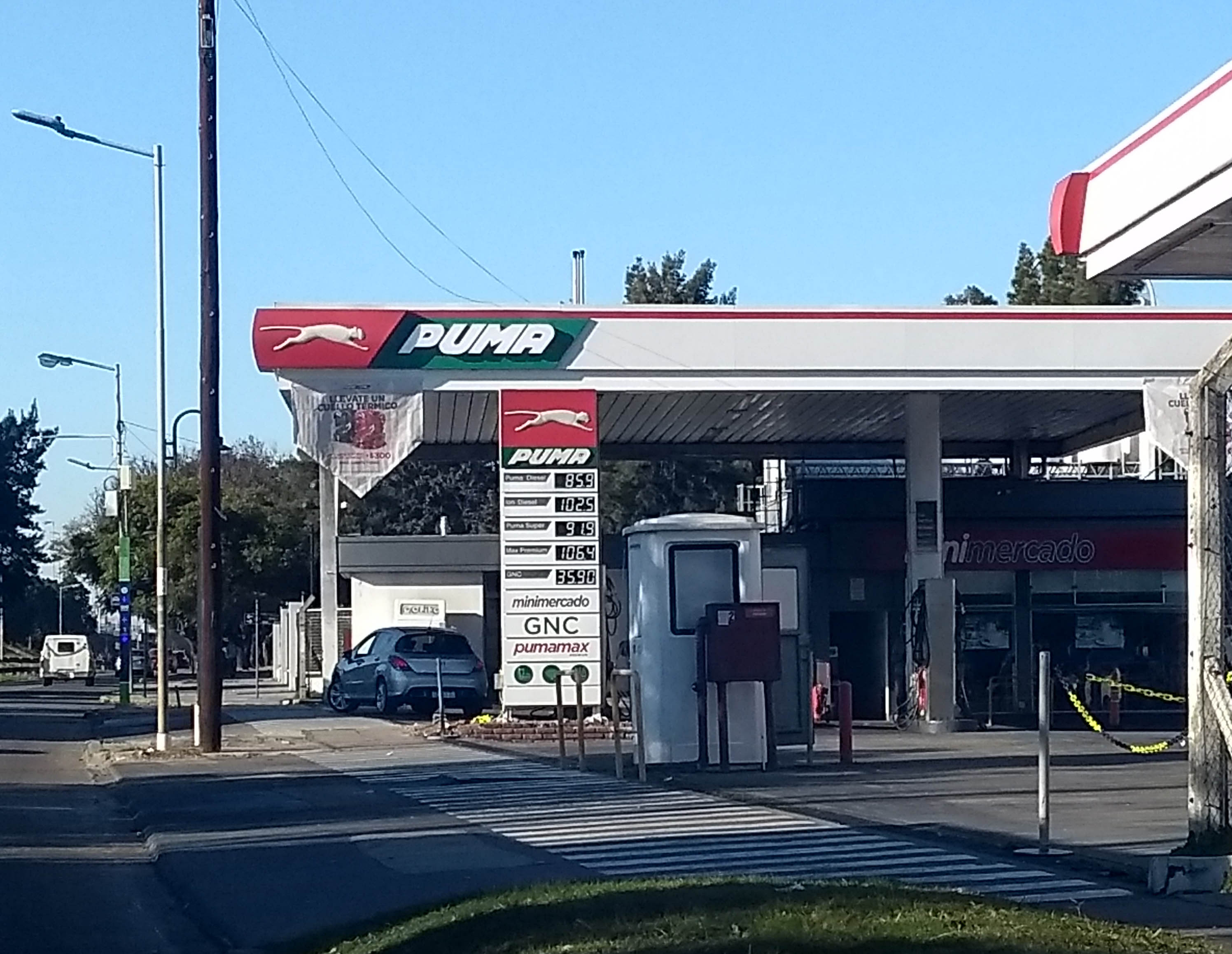
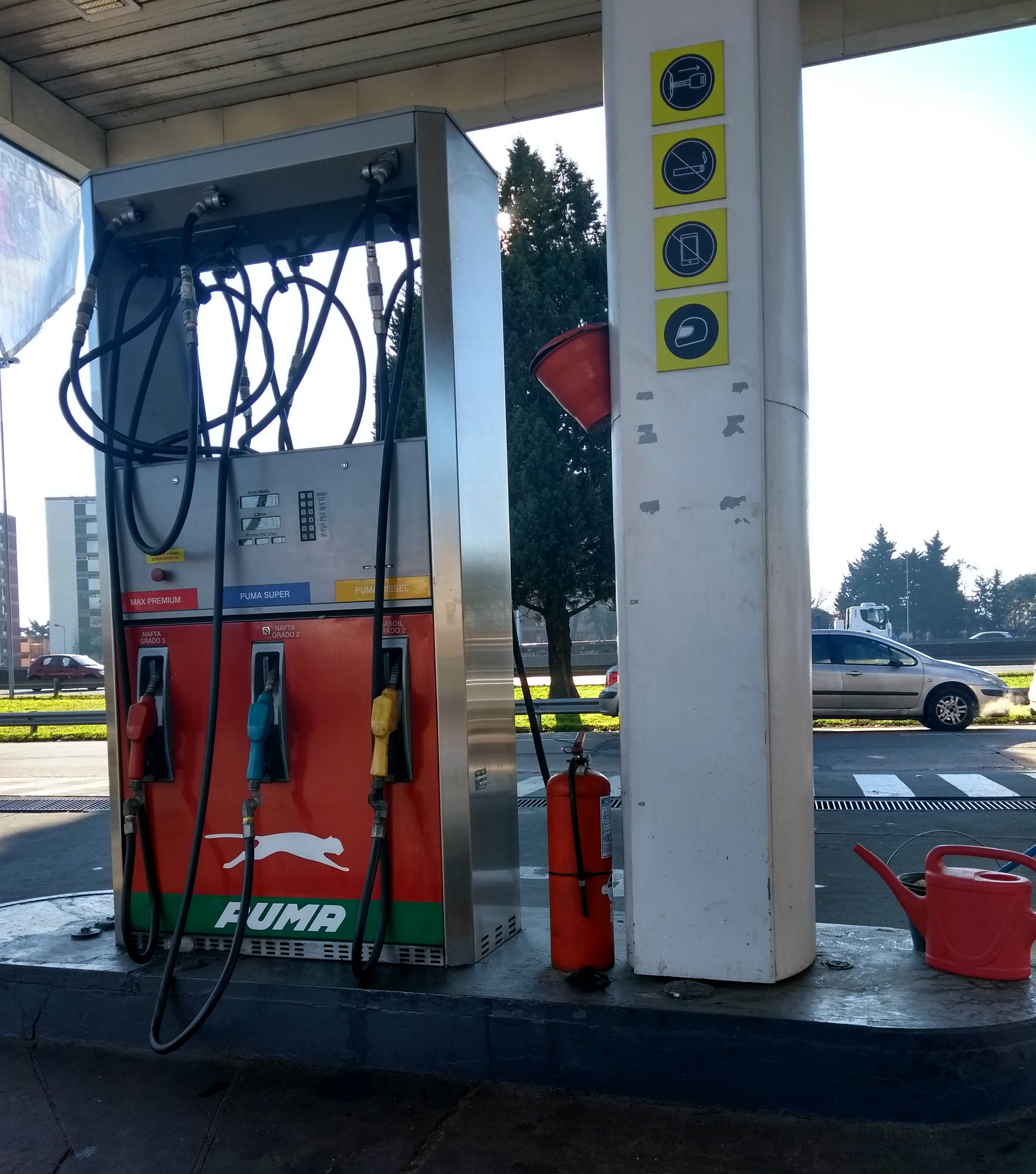
(Left): Puma Energy fuel terminals in Guatemala; (right): Puma petrol station in Munro, Buenos Aires, July 2021

In 2010 Puma Energy formed a regional subsidiary, Puma Energy Caribe, which bought Caribbean Petroleum Corporation's fire-damaged fuel depot in Puerto Rico and 147 Gulf-branded service stations. In March 2012 the firm acquired ExxonMobil's downstream businesses in Guatemala, El Salvador, Honduras, Nicaragua, Panama, and Belize, establishing it as one of the region's largest petroleum companies. In Nicaragua the firm has 40% of the retail market as well as an oil refinery in Managua, acquired from Exxon, with a capacity of 20,000 barrels per day (3,200 m^{3}/d).

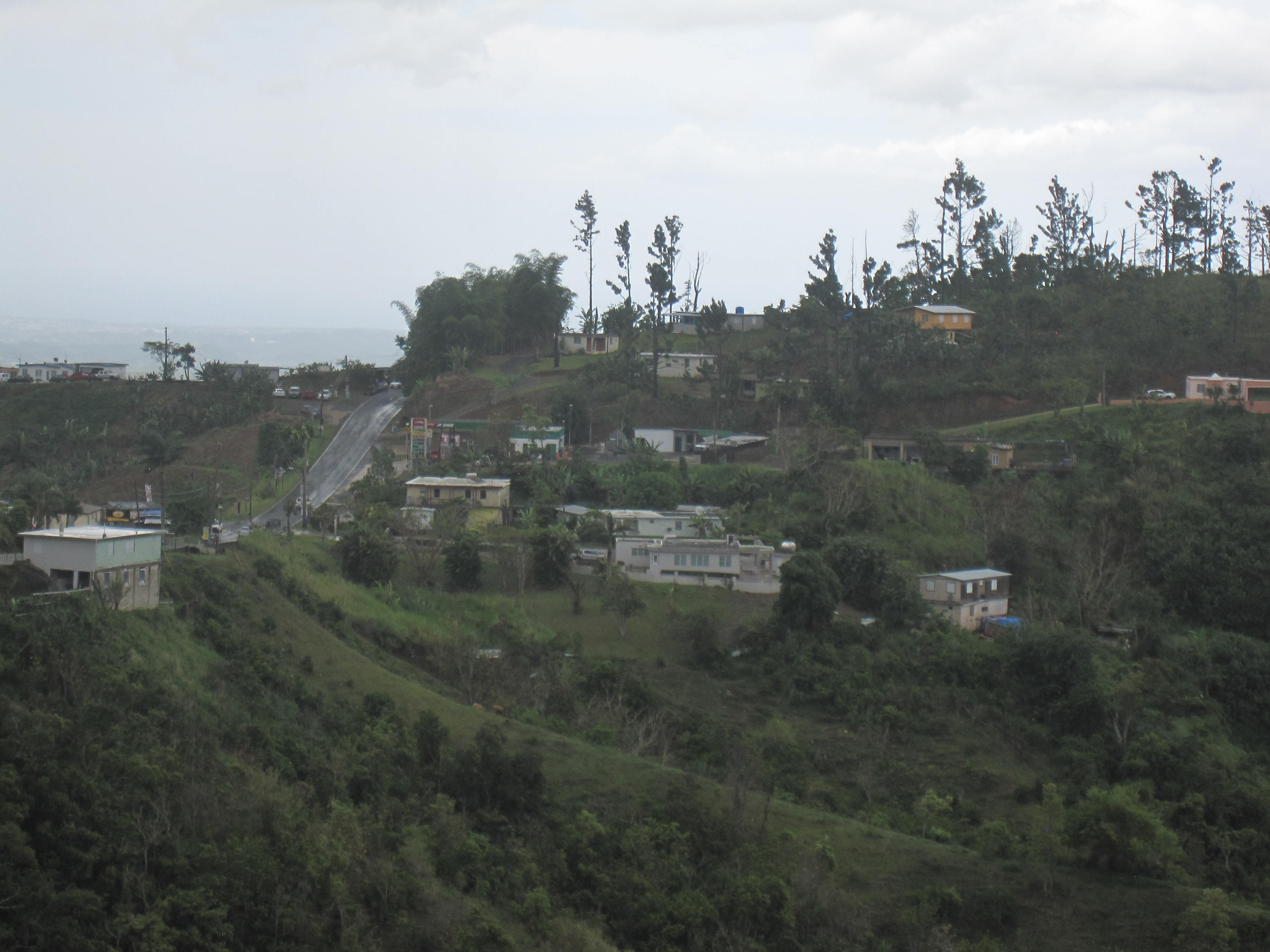
Puma Perchas service station in a rural section of Puerto Rico

In July 2012 the firm purchased Chevron's fuel distribution and storage businesses in Puerto Rico and the United States Virgin Islands. The assets include 192 Texaco service stations, an aviation fuel supply and storage tanks with a combined capacity of 430,000 barrels (68,000 m^{3}). A further acquisition from ExxonMobil was made in November 2012 by the purchase of Esso Standard Oil's supply and marketing business in the Dominican Republic. In February 2013 Puma Energy and Castrol formed a new partnership to market Castrol lubricants in all six of Puma's Central American markets as well as Paraguay.

In March 2015, Puma Energy purchased all the assets of the Colombian fuel storage and distribution firm Save Combustibles, including 135 service stations. The deal was the company's first acquisition in Colombia.

The brand Puma returned to Argentina in May 2016, when the company opened a petrol station in Saladillo, after Trafigura acquired Brazilian company Petrobras' local assets for US$90 million. As a result, a total of 250 former Petrobras stations (operated by local firm Pampa Energía) were rebranded as Puma. With the purchase, Puma Energy also took control of an oil refinery in Bahía Blanca, and other plants in Avellaneda and Santa Cruz Province. With a 4.9% market share, Puma ranked as the fourth petroleum brand in Argentina after YPF (55.1%), Shell and Axion. in 2023 Puma Energy made an agreement with Shell to use the Shell brand in some of their service stations in Honduras and El Salvador.

=== Asia-Pacific ===
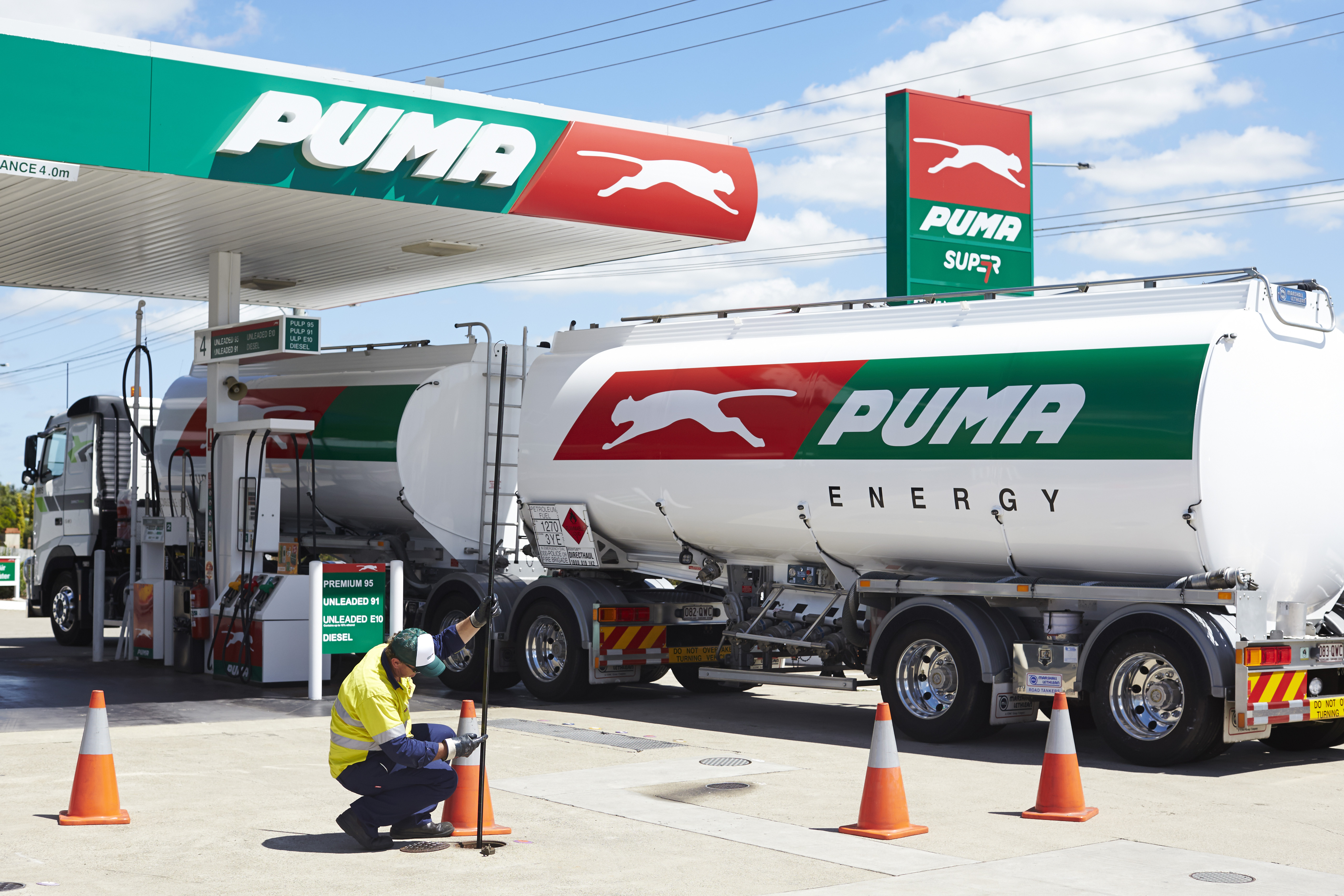
Puma Energy forecourt in Brisbane, Australia

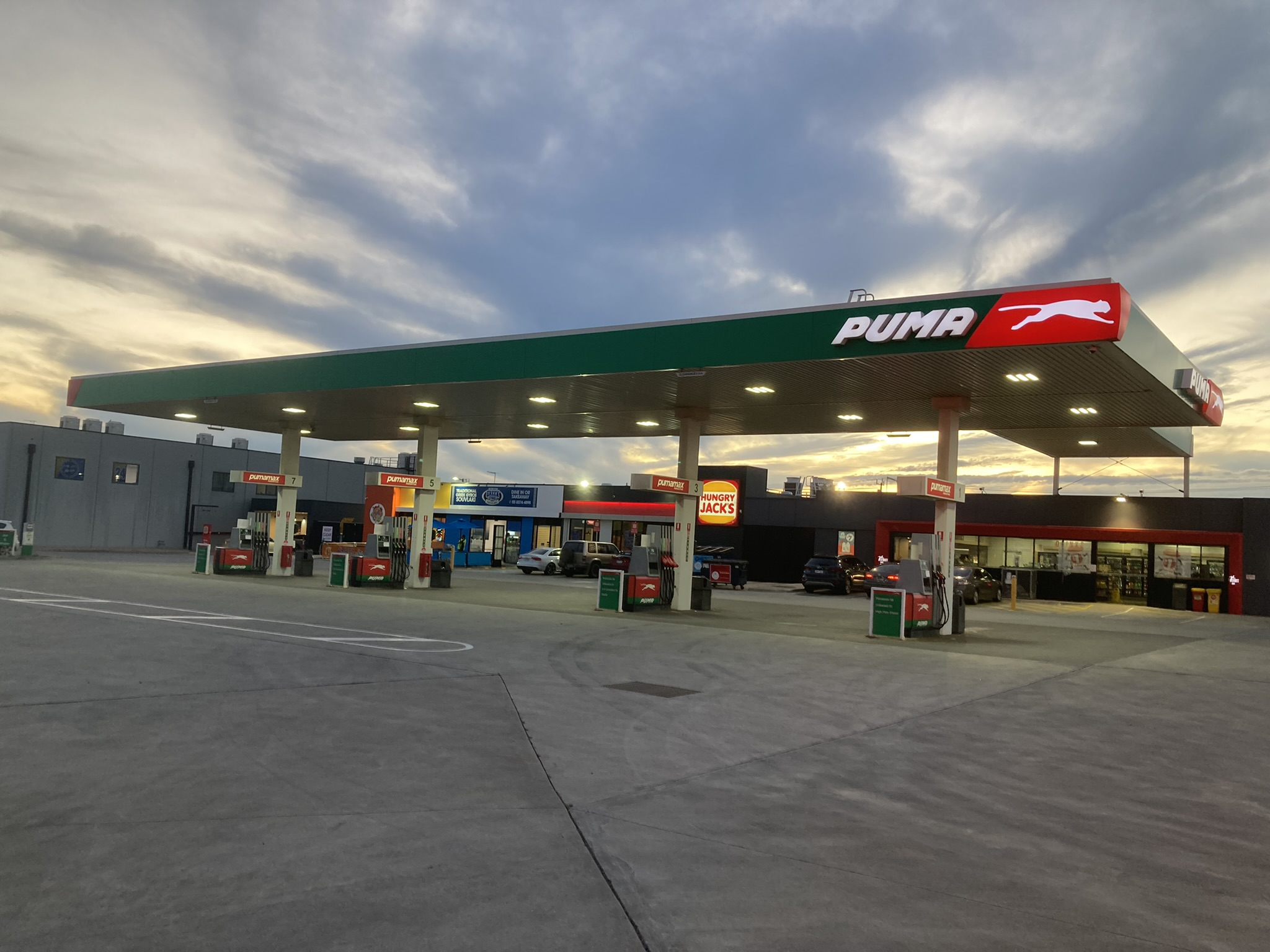
Puma station in Melbourne, Australia in November 2022. At the time this photo was taken, Puma Energy's operations in the country have already been sold to Chevron Corporation and are being replaced with the Caltex brand.

In July 2012, Puma Energy announced its acquisition of Singapore-based Chevron Kuo Pte, owner of a 70% share of Chevron Bitumen Vietnam – an importer and distributor of asphalt for infrastructure projects in Vietnam. The deal was completed in November 2012. Thus, the firm expanded its activities into the global bitumen market.

In October 2012 Indonesian oil and gas company MedcoEnergi signed an agreement with Puma Energy to sell a 64% stake in its liquid-fuel storage and distribution subsidiary, PT Medco Sarana Kalibaru (MSK). MSK's downstream assets include a 22,700 cubic metres (800,000 cu ft) high-speed diesel (HSD) storage facility in Jakarta as well as transport infrastructure and a distribution network for supplying fuel to mining companies in Sumatra and Kalimantan.

In January 2013, Puma Energy entered the Australian market when it bought Neumann Petroleum (Matilda and Neumann brands) in Queensland, Australia, including 125 service stations and an $18 million bulk seaboard fuel terminal in Brisbane. The following month, it also acquired Ausfuel (including Gull Petroleum) from Archer Capital for $652 million, becoming the country's largest independent fuel retailer. At the same time, it also bought Central Combined Group, the largest independent fuel marketer in central Queensland. In December 2019, Puma Energy agreed terms to sell its Australian operations to Chevron, finalised in mid-2020. Since early 2022, the Puma Energy stations in the country were progressively rebranded to Chevron's Caltex brand. 17 of these Puma stations in the Northern Territory were then sold again to South Australian-based OTR in early 2023, with Caltex fuel to be supplied at these stations.

In June 2014 Puma Energy acquired InterOil Corp (IOC)'s Napa Napa oil refinery, 52 service stations and 30 fuel depots, terminal and aviation sites in Papua New Guinea for $526 million.

In November 2014, Puma Energy opened the Langsat Bitumen Terminal, a 74,000-tonne bitumen storage facility in Johor, Malaysia.

In October 2015, Puma Energy signed a joint-venture agreement with Myanmar government-owned Myanmar Petroleum Products Enterprise (MPPE) to form National Energy Puma Aviation Services (NEPAS). The new entity was aimed at distributing aviation fuel to 11 airports across Myanmar .Puma exited Myanmar in 2022 after selling its stake in Puma Energy Asia Sun (PEAS) and minority share in National Energy Puma Aviation Services (NEPAS) to a locally owned company.

=== Europe ===
In March 2015, Puma Energy made its first acquisition in the United Kingdom, purchasing the disused Milford Haven Refinery in Wales from Murphy Oil subsidiary Murco for use as a fuel storage site.

In 2016, Puma Energy signed a purchase agreement with BP to buy its bulk storage fuel terminal in Belfast, Northern Ireland.

== Ownership ==
Trafigura is Puma Energy's biggest shareholder, with a 96% stake. The remaining minority shares are owned by private shareholders.

In December 2012, the Financial Times reported that Trafigura had designated 2014 as the 'earliest' date for a public offering of Puma Energy, with London the most likely market.

== Sports sponsorships ==
Puma Energy has in the past sponsored a number of sporting events in Africa including the Zambia International Rally. In 2012 the firm sponsored the Malawi Open Tennis Championship. In 2012, the firm partnered with the Madison General insurance company to sponsor Zambia's National Rally Champion Mohammed Essa.

Most recently, in 2025, Puma Energy entered into a local partnership with the South American Football Confederation (CONMEBOL), becoming a partner of the annual CONMEBOL Libertadores and CONMEBOL Sudamericana competitions.
