= Teesside oil terminal =

Oil terminal in County Durham, England

- Interactive map of Teesside oil terminal
- Location: Middlesbrough, England, United Kingdom; 54°37′05″N 1°10′37″W

Refinery details
- Operator: ConocoPhillips
- Opened: 1975
- Capacity: 800,000 barrels per day (130,000 m^{3}/d)

The Teesside oil terminal is a major crude oil reception, processing, storage and export facility at Seal Sands, Middlesbrough. It receives and processes crude oil delivered by the subsea NORPIPE pipeline from the Norwegian Ekofisk field and the UK Fulmar and J-Block fields. The terminal includes facilities for exporting stabilised crude oil and liquefied petroleum gases (LPG) by tanker and pipeline.

== History ==
The Ekofisk field was commissioned in 1970 with gas from the field exported to Emden Germany and oil loaded into tankers offshore. In 1975 the 354-km Norpipe subsea pipeline was commissioned to transport oil from Ekofisk to Seal Sands Teesside UK. The Teesside oil terminal (54°37'05"N 1°10'37"W) was designed to treat this oil to a specification suitable for atmospheric storage and tanker transportation. It was also designed to process the associated natural gas liquids (NGL). A connection to Norpipe in the UK sector of the North Sea allowed UK fields to export oil to Teesside as they were commissioned. These included the Fulmar installation commissioned in 1982, and the Judy installation, commissioned in 1997.

The 285-acre (115 ha) Teesside site was selected for the deep water moorings available. The oil terminal was officially opened on 21 October 1975. Three days later the first tanker departed Teesside with a cargo of stabilised Ekofisk oil treated at the Teesside terminal. Initially the plant was unable to process natural gas liquids. The NGL plant was commissioned in March 1979. The terminal also provided feedstock to the nearby Shell UK Ltd Teessport Refinery.

== The plant ==
The plant at the Teesside terminal includes the following:

- Crude oil reception and storage facilities – including pig receiver, isolation valves and 4 oil storage spheres
- Six parallel oil stabilisation trains – comprising crude washing, heating, degassing, cooling and pumping
- Natural gas liquids (NGL) processing plant – this fractionates NGL into purified gas and liquid products, the plant includes distillation, compression and storage facilities
- Product export plant – including pumping, metering, export pipelines, jetties and tanker loading plant
- Vapour recovery facilities – including volatile organic compounds (VOC) carbon bed absorption
- Effluent treatment – including ballast water and plant effluent, treatment includes plate separators and dissolved air flotation. Effluent is sent to the Bran Sands sewage treatment works for final biological treatment
- Utilities – including power generation, steam raising, firewater, instrument air and inert gas
- Flare system – for disposal of unwanted gases

== Operations ==
The specification of oil arriving at Teesside from the Norpipe pipeline is typically:

Live crude import properties
Parameter	Value
True Vapour Pressure	230 kPa @ 38 °C
Base sediment and water	0.2 % volume
Salt	250 lb/Mbbl
H_{2}S	10 ppm weight
Total sulphur	0.35 % wt
Nickel	10 ppm weight
Vanadium	10 ppm weight
Viscosity	40 cP @ 3 °C
pH	>5
Mercury	0.15 ppb weight

The Teesside terminal was originally designed to process 1 million barrels/day of live crude oil. It currently (2020) receives 800,000 barrels/day (127,186 m^{3}/d) of oil and processes up to 67,000 barrels/day (10,652 m^{3}/d) of NGL.

The specification of the plant is to produce stabilised crude with a Reid vapour pressure of 3 to 8 psig (20.7 – 55 kPa).

=== Stabilisation ===
There are six parallel stabilizer columns, the heat to drive the separation process is by reboilers at the base of each column. Each reboiler has a thermal capacity of 40 MW. In the base of the stabilisers the temperature is sufficient to drive off lighter hydrocarbons as vapour. These rise through the column, stripping lights ends out of the down-coming oil. The light ends are withdrawn from the top of the stabilisers where they are compressed and routed to the NGL plant. Stabilized crude is drawn off the base of the stabilisers and is cooled and routed to storage tanks. There are 9 stabilised oil tanks each with a capacity 750,000 barrels (119,237 m^{3}).

=== NGL processing ===
The gases from the top section of the stabilisers are routed to the NGL plant. The plant also receives (since 1998) NGL recovered in the adjacent CATS gas terminal. The plant is capable of processing 64,000 barrels/day (10,175 m^{3}/d). It comprises a series of fractionation vessels: de-methaniser, de-ethaniser, de-propaniser, de-butaniser and butane splitter. The vessels operate at successively lower pressures and higher temperatures. The vapour from the top of each vessel is respectively methane, ethane, propane, butane and iso-butane. Propane is used as a refrigeration medium in the plant. There are three propane compressors each driven by a 3.1 MW gas turbine. The flue gases from the gas turbines are routed to the combustion chambers of the steam boilers. There are three steam boilers of 104 MW capacity which provide steam for the stabiliser plant reboilers. Methane is used as fuel gas on the plant. Ethane, propane and butane are liquefied and sent to insulated storage tanks prior to loading onto ships.

=== Export ===
When required oil is pumped from the tanks to the quays and loaded aboard tankers. The terminal has four quays for crude oil export. One of these quays can be used for NGL products. There are also four quays for liquefied petroleum gases (LPG) loading. The crude oil quays are each capable of handling tankers of up to 150,000 deadweight tonnes, the LPG quays can handle carriers of up to 60,000 m^{3}. Each of the jetties is provided with a vapour collection and recovery system. There are two vapour recovery units capable of processing 16,000 m^{3}/h of hydrocarbon rich vapour, comprising vacuum pumps, guard beds and absorber columns. In addition to sea transport stabilised crude can also exported by pipeline to the Greatham tank farm.

== Owners ==
The Teesside oil terminal was owned and operated by Phillips Petroleum Company from 1975 to 2002.

Ownership transferred to ConocoPhillips when Phillips and Conoco Inc. merged in 2002.

By 2018 the terminal was still operated by ConocoPhillips. It was owned by:

- ConocoPhillips Petroleum Company U.K. Ltd. 40.25%
- Total Holdings Europe S.A.S 45.22%
- ENI S.p.A. 14.20%
- Minority shareholder 0.33%

== See also ==
- North Sea Oil
- Oil terminal
- Norpipe
- Flotta oil terminal
- Sullom Voe Terminal
- Oil terminals in the United Kingdom
- List of oil and gas fields in the North Sea
