= Harwich refinery =

Oil refinery in Harwich, England

- Interactive map of Harwich refinery
- Location: Harwich, United Kingdom; 51°56′32″N 1°14′18″E

Refinery details
- Operator: Haltermann Carless
- Owner: Haltermann Carless
- Opened: 1964 by Carless, Capel and Leonard Limited
- Capacity: 500,000 tonnes per year
- No. of employees: 100 (2022)
- No. of oil tanks: 170

Harwich refinery is a 500,000 tonnes per year refining, processing, blending and storage facility near the port of Harwich in the UK. The refinery was commissioned in 1964 to process petroleum-based feedstocks into specialist hydrocarbon solvents.

== History ==
The Carless Company was founded by Eugene Carless in 1859 to process naphtha and the by-products of coal gas production into solvents, petrol and diesel fuel. The company was known as Carless Capel when it was purchased by John Hare Leonard in 1873. It operated from sites in Hackney Wick and Bow in East London. The company was floated on the stock market in December 1948 as Carless, Capel and Leonard Limited.

In the late 1950s and the early 1960s the British gas industry experimented with the use of oil-based rather than coal-based feedstocks to manufacture town gas. Carless realised that these changes would reduce the feedstock available for its processes and therefore also began to use petroleum-based feedstock available from oil refineries.

With the advent of North Sea gas in 1967 a further feedstock became available; condensate was produced with natural gas and was separated from the gas at shore terminals such as at Bacton, Norfolk.

== Harwich refinery ==
Harwich refinery was built on a 38 acre (15.4 hectare) site at Parkeston, Harwich in 1964 at a cost of £600,000. In its first year it processed 14,000 tonnes using a batch distillation plant. This represented about half of the petroleum solvents used in Britain at that time. Such solvents were used in chemicals, rubber, paint, printing ink, adhesive and pharmaceuticals. Other refinery products included chemical naphtha (for petrochemicals), kerosine fuel, and hydrocarbon resins.

In 1968 the original plant at Harwich was expanded, which doubled the refining capability. In 1971 Carless entered into a contract with Phillips/Arpet to take all the condensate it produced at Bacton. Condensate is pumped from Bacton to North Walsham through a pipeline. At North Walsham, adjacent to the railway station, condensate is routed to storage tanks; periodically rail wagons are filled from the tanks and are transferred to Harwich refinery by rail. Harwich refinery has three railway sidings. In addition to the railway connection there is a jetty in the River Stour capable of handling vessels of up to 14,000 tonnes displacement and a draught of 7.5 m.

In 1981 an extraction plant was added to the facilities at Harwich, costing £2m.

In 1990/1 a three-column vacuum distillation unit was commissioned which increased the capacity by 50 percent.

The following distillation plant is operational in 2022.

Harwich refinery distillation plant
Plant	Equipment/ column	Capacity	Operating conditions	Heating medium	Column internals
Batch distillation plant	Batch Still 1	45 m^{3}	2.04 barg & full vacuum	Steam 10 barg 184 °C	40 pairs sieve trays
Batch distillation plant	Batch Still 2	90 m^{3}	2.04 barg & full vacuum	Steam 10 barg 184 °C	43 pairs sieve trays
Condensate distillation plant	Column 1	30 tonnes per hour	2.4 barg & full vacuum	Mineral oil 298 °C	40 valve trays
Condensate distillation plant	Column 2	30 tonnes per hour	2.4 barg & full vacuum	Mineral oil 298 °C	40 valve trays
Condensate distillation plant	Column 3	30 tonnes per hour	1.7 barg & full vacuum	Mineral oil 298 °C	20 valve trays
Condensate distillation plant	Column 4	30 tonnes per hour	3.0 barg & full vacuum	Mineral oil 298 °C	4 stages of structured packing
High vacuum distillation plant	Column 1	25 tonnes per hour	1.5 barg & full vacuum	Synthetic oil 320 °C	26 valve trays
High vacuum distillation plant	Column 2	25 tonnes per hour	1.5 barg & full vacuum	Synthetic oil 320 °C	36 stages of structured packing
High vacuum distillation plant	Column 3	25 tonnes per hour	1.5 barg & full vacuum	Synthetic oil 320 °C	36 stages of structured packing

The storage capacity of the site amounts to 150,000 m^{3} in 170 storage tanks of 12 m^{3} to 15,000 m^{3}.

== Ownership ==
In 1989 Carless Refining & Marketing and Carless Petrochem UK were acquired by Repsol SA. 1990 In 2000 Repsol sold the Carless companies to Petrochem UK which formed Petrochem Carless. Meanwhile, Dow Chemical acquired the Haltermann company in 2003, which was then later acquired by H.I.G. Capital in 2011. This led to the establishment of the new Holding company, HCS Group. Petrochem Carless was acquired by HCS Group in 2013, and was renamed Haltermann Carless.

There were about 20 employees in 1964; this increased to 270 employees in 1971 and is about 100 today.

== See also ==
- Petroleum refining in the United Kingdom
- Oil terminals in the United Kingdom
- Oil and gas industry in the United Kingdom
