= Murco =

British oil refining company

Murco Petroleum
- Industry: Oil & Gas
- Founded: 1960
- Founder: Murphy Oil Corporation
- Headquarters: St Albans, England
- Area served: United Kingdom
- Products: Oil and gas exploration production Natural Gas & LNG; Trading & transportation Oil refining Chemicals
- Services: Fuel stations
- Website: www.murco.co.uk

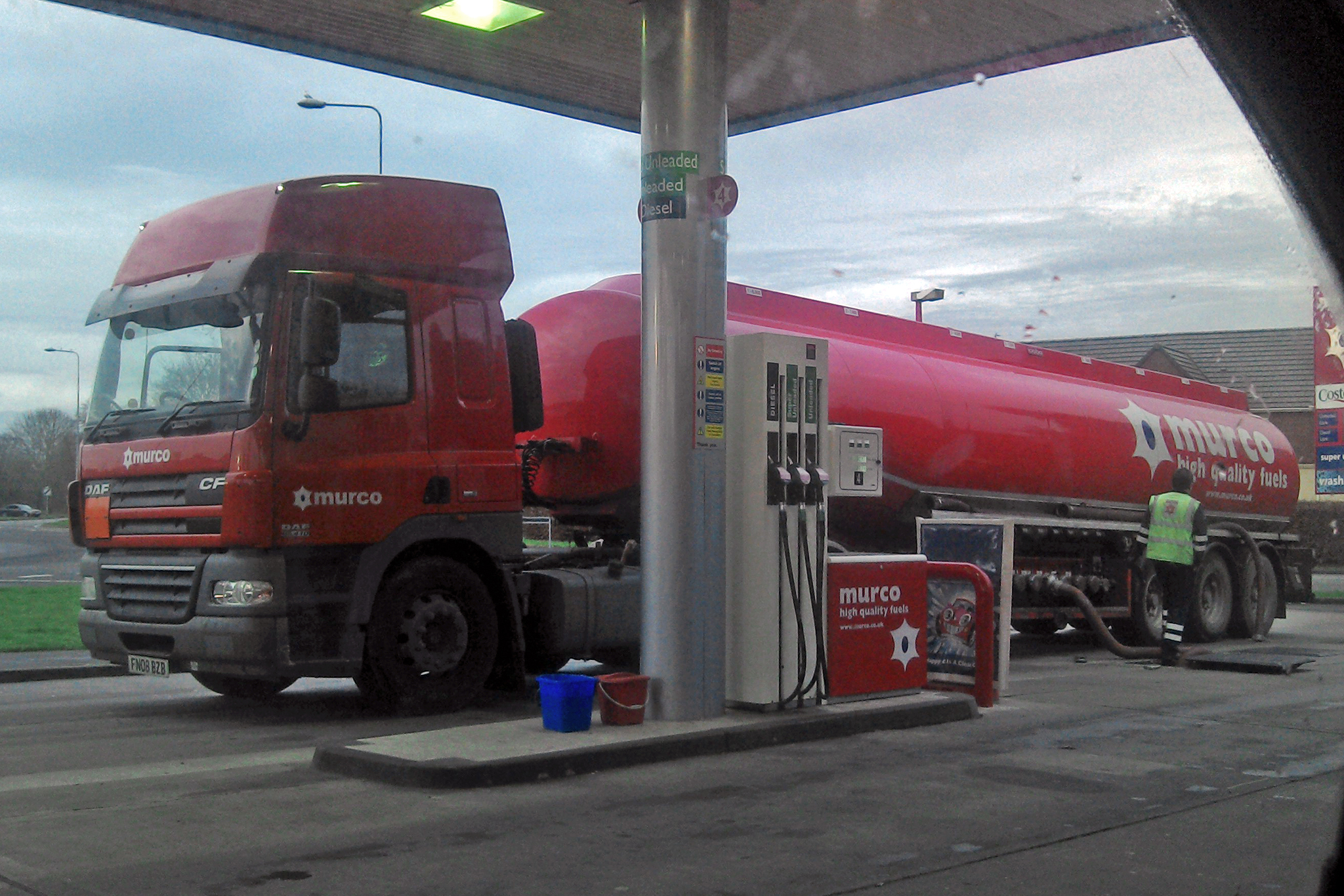
A Murco DAF CF Tanker in Ellesmere Port. (January 2013)

Murco is an oil refining company based in the United Kingdom. It was set up by Murphy Oil Corporation in 1960. The company owns a forecourt-based chain of convenience stores of Costcutter. Murco purchased a 30% stake in Amoco’s Milford Haven Refinery in 1981, and the remaining 70% in 2007.

In 2008, the firm purchased Petrol Express Limited for £52 million from its parent company GNE Group, acquiring 63 petrol stations to bring its total to 230.

After trying for two years to sell a Murco plant in the UK, in 2014, Murphy announced it would close the location. It was announced in November 2014 that Milford Haven Refinery was to close with the loss of around 350 jobs.

On 1 October 2014, the Murco retail business was sold by Murco Petroleum to independent forecourt operator MFG (Motor Fuel Group). In 2016 MFG introduced a new look for Murco. In 2015, Puma Energy purchased assets from Murco Petroleum, including a closed refinery at Pembrokeshire in Wales. Three of Murco's inland terminals in the UK were also acquired.
