= Offshore Energies UK =

British energy trade association

UK Offshore Energies Association Ltd
- Formation: April 2007
- Legal status: Limited company
- Purpose: Trade association
- Location: 1st Floor, Paternoster House, 65 St Paul’s Churchyard, London EC4M 8AB, England
- Region served: United Kingdom
- Members: Over 400 organizations
- Chief Executive: David Whitehouse
- Website: www.oeuk.org.uk

Offshore Energies UK (OEUK), formerly Oil and Gas UK (OGUK), is a trade association for the United Kingdom offshore energy industry. The current Chief Executive is David Whitehouse.

== History ==
OEUK is a not-for-profit organisation, established in April 2007 as Oil and Gas UK on the foundations of the UK Offshore Operators Association (UKOOA). The association is the leading representative body for the UK offshore energies that stretches back over 30 years. Its membership is open to all companies active in the area; these include businesses such as super majors, independent oil companies, wind and hydrogen, and SMEs working in the supply chain.

== Function ==
OEUK is a trade association for the whole sector. It is a source of information for and about the UK Upstream and a gateway to industry networks and expertise.

They do this by:

- raising the profile of the UK offshore energies sector.
- promoting open dialogue within and across all sectors of the industry on issues including technical, fiscal, safety, environmental and skills issues, and brokering solutions.
- developing and delivering industry-wide initiatives engaging with governments and other external organisations with a stake in the industry’s future.

== Location ==
The association is situated near St Paul's Cathedral on the 1st Floor of Paternoster House in the City of Westminster. It also has an office on 4th Floor, Annan House, 33-35 Palmerston Road, Aberdeen, AB11 5QP, in the city where the UKOOA was based.

=== Subsidiaries ===
OEUK has one subsidiary:

- Leading Oil and Gas Industry Competitiveness

== See also ==
- Petroleum industry in Aberdeen
- Oil and gas industry in the United Kingdom
- North Sea oil
- List of oil and gas fields of the North Sea
- UK Petroleum Industry Association
