= Gulf Refinery, Milford Haven =

Former oil refinery at Milford Haven, Wales

Gulf Refinery
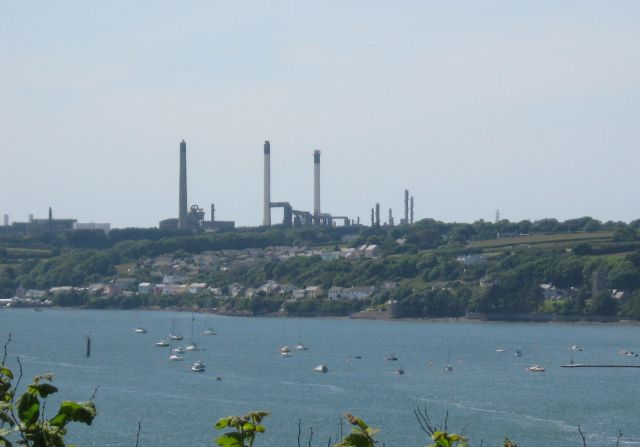
- Interactive map of Gulf Refinery
- Location: Waterston, Milford Haven, Pembrokeshire, United Kingdom; 51.705°N 4.992°W

Refinery details
- Operator: Chevron
- Opened: August 1968
- Closed: December 1997
- Capacity: 119,000 barrels per day (18,900 m^{3}/d)

The Gulf Refinery at Milford Haven was an oil refinery situated on the Pembrokeshire coast in Wales. The refinery, originally owned and operated by Gulf Oil, was opened in August 1968 by Queen Elizabeth II. The plant, constructed at a cost of approximately £35 million, produced a range of petroleum products and occupied an area of 300 acres (121.4 ha). It was initially designed to process 60,000 barrels of crude oil per day (3 million tonnes per year). The capacity was increased to 119,000 barrels (18,900 m^{3}) a day of oil.

== Oil import ==
Gulf Oil's crude oil was principally obtained from Nigeria and Kuwait through joint ventures with BP. Crude was shipped to Bantry Bay in Ireland in 312,000 DWT (deadweight ton) ships. The Bantry Bay facility had a storage capacity of one million tonnes. It was commissioned just before the refinery opened at a cost of £13m. From Bantry Bay crude oil was shipped in 100,000 DWT ships to Gulf's refineries in Milford Haven, Denmark and Rotterdam.

== Operations ==
The Milford Haven refinery was integrated with two petro-chemical plants, using oil products from the refinery as feed-stock. One produced 50,000 tonnes a year of benzene and the other 100,000 tonnes a year of cyclohexane. The refinery employed about 280 people. About 23 per cent of the refinery output was exported by train via a rail link to the national rail network. About 75 per cent of the output was exported by ship.

Gulf Oil's refinery also supplied fuel oil to the nearby oil-fired 2,000 MW Pembroke power station (commissioned in 1968).

The refining distillation capacity over the operational life of the refinery was as follows.

Gulf Refinery, refining capacity
Year	Capacity (million tonnes per year)
1969	4.0
1972	5.0
1974	5.0
1975	5.0
1979	5.0
1985	4.625
1990	5.3
1995	5.6

== Owners ==
Gulf Oil merged with Standard Oil of California (SOCAL) in 1985 with both rebranded as Chevron.

== Closure ==
The refinery closed down in December 1997, as part of plans by the Chevron Corporation, by then the owners of Gulf Oil, to withdraw from the downstream oil business in the UK. Today, the site is occupied by the Valero Pembrokeshire Oil Terminal (VPOT) and the Dragon LNG terminal.

== See also ==
- Esso Refinery, Milford Haven
- Milford Haven Refinery, owned by Murco
- Pembroke Refinery, Texaco/Valero
- Oil refineries in the United Kingdom
