= Institute of Petroleum =

Former British professional organization

- Formerly: Institute of Petroleum Technologists
- Company type: Public company
- Industry: Petroleum, oil and gas
- Founded: 1913
- Founder: Sir Thomas Boverton Redwood and Arthur Eastlake
- Defunct: July 2003
- Fate: Merged with Institute of Energy to form the Energy Institute
- Successor: Energy Institute
- Headquarters: 61 New Cavendish St, Marylebone, London W1G 7AR UK
- Area served: International
- Services: Standards setting, information dissemination to corporate and individual members

The Institute of Petroleum (IP) was a UK-based professional organisation founded in 1913 as the Institute of Petroleum Technologists. It changed its name to the Institute of Petroleum in 1938. The institute became defunct when it merged with the Institute of Energy in 2003 to form the Energy Institute.

== Background ==
The Institute of Petroleum Technologists was established in 1913 by the consulting chemist and engineer Sir Thomas Boverton Redwood (1846–1919) and Arthur Eastlake. At the institute's inaugural meeting in 1914 Sir Thomas stated that the aim of the institute was to determine a "hallmark of proficiency in connection with our profession". He emphasised the need to amalgamate the diverse knowledge and interests of the various branches of the oil industry. In 1938 the institute changed its name to the Institute of Petroleum and membership was opened to all professions associated with the oil and gas industries.

== Operation ==
The Institute of Petroleum had similar goals to the Energy Institute but was specifically focused on the oil and gas industry, whereas the Energy Institute also covers other forms of energy including nuclear and alternative energies.

The IP designation still survives, for example in the specification of test methods in the petroleum industry. The Energy Institute still runs an "International Petroleum (IP) Week", a series of events and seminars aimed at the petroleum industry.

The institute's crest was an Archaeopteryx with the Latin motto conjunctione potiores (translated as 'preferential coupling').

== Publications ==
The institute published a monthly magazine Petroleum Review, which the Energy Institute continues to publish.

Scholarly articles were published in the Journal of the Institute of Petroleum from 1939, previously the Journal of the Institute of Petroleum Technologists (Volumes 1 to 24; 1914–1938).

The Petroleum Institute published an extensive range of internationally recognised codes of practice, guidance and petroleum test procedures. The following lists are a sample of the published material.

=== Codes of safe practice ===
Model codes of safe practice (MCSP) included:

- MCSP Part 1: The selection, installation, inspection and maintenance of electrical and non-electrical apparatus in hazardous areas. MCSP 1 Electrical safety code. 7th edition (2003)
- MCSP Part 2 Design, construction and operation of distribution installations (1998)
- MCSP Part 6, Pipeline Safety Code
- MCSP Part 9 Liquefied petroleum gas. Volume 1: Large bulk pressure storage and refrigerated LPG (1987)
- MCSP Part 11 Bitumen safety code. 3rd edition (1990)
- MCSP Part 15: Area classification for installations handling flammable fluids
- MCSP Part 16: Guidance on tank cleaning
- MCSP Part 19: Fire precautions at petroleum refineries and bulk storage installations
- MCSP Part 21 Guidelines for the control of hazards arising from static electricity. 2nd edition (2002)
- Code of safe practice for contractors working on petrol filling stations (1997)
- Code of safe practice for retailers managing contractors working on petrol filling stations (1999)

=== General ===
- Air quality and its association with human health effects (2001)
- Electrical installation of facilities for the storage and dispensing of LPG and CNG automotive fuels at vehicle refuelling stations (2003)

=== Guidelines ===
- Guidance document on risk assessment for the water environment at operational fuel storage and dispensing facilities (1999)
- Guidance on external cathodic protection of underground steel storage tanks and steel pipework at petrol filling stations (2002)
- Guidelines for investigation and remediation of petroleum retail sites (1998)
- Guidelines for soil, groundwater and surface water protection and vapour emission control at petrol filling stations (2003)

=== Test methods ===
This list is a sample of the test methods available. Note that the IP designation still exists in the specification of these test methods.

- IP 2: Petroleum products and hydrocarbon solvents - Determination of aniline point and mixed aniline point
- IP 4: Petroleum products - Determination of ash (ISO 6245:2001)
- IP 10: Determination of kerosine burning characteristics - 24 hour method
- IP 12: Determination of specific energy
- IP 13: Petroleum products - Determination of carbon residue - Conradson method
- IP 14: Petroleum products - Determination of carbon residue - Ramsbottom method
- IP 16: Determination of the freezing point of aviation fuels — Manual method
- IP 17: Determination of colour — Lovibond® tintometer® method
- IP 30: Detection of mercaptans, hydrogen sulfide, elemental sulfur and peroxides - Doctor test method
- IP 34: Determination of flash point — Pensky-Martens closed cup method
- IP 36: Determination of flash and fire points - Cleveland open cup method
- IP 334: Determination of load carrying capacity of lubricants - FZG gear machine method
- IP 628: Determination of the Solvent Yellow 124 content of kerosine and gas oil – HPLC Method

== See also ==
- American Petroleum Institute
- Oil and gas industry in the United Kingdom
- Oil terminals in the United Kingdom
- Petroleum refining in the United Kingdom
