= Cloghan Point =

Oil terminal in Ireland

Coordinates: 54.7386°N 5.7291°W

Cloghan Point is an oil terminal located in Belfast Lough, near the town of Whitehead, County Antrim, Northern Ireland.

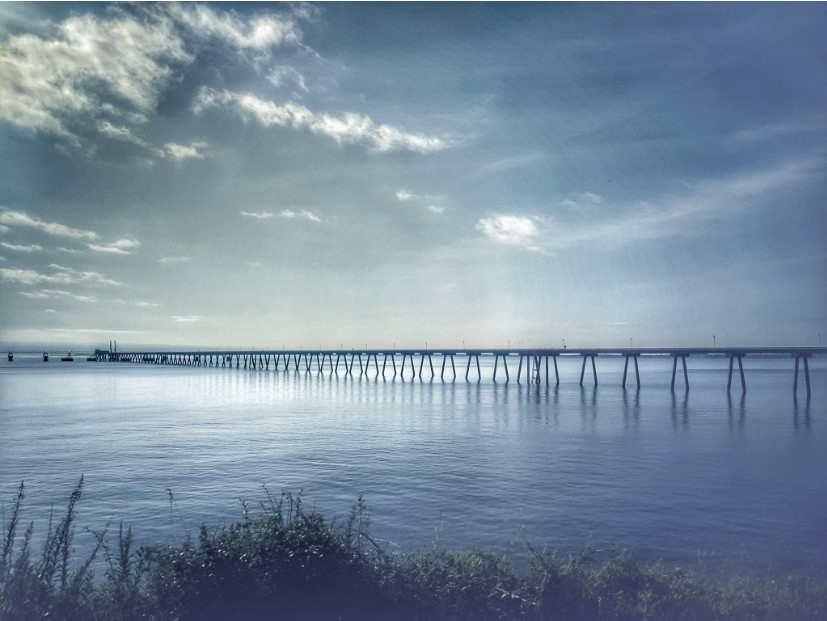
Cloghan Point jetty seen from the Larne-Belfast railway line

The terminal was originally built by Northern Ireland Electricity in 1979 to supply the nearby Kilroot and Ballylumford power stations.

The facility was constructed as an import, storage and distribution hub for heavy fuel oil. However, following the installation of a new HFO pipeline from the terminal directly to Kilroot power station in 2008, the storage facility became effectively redundant.

The storage facility, which is capable of storing 126,000 tonnes of heavy fuel oil, is currently owned by the Republic of Ireland's National Oil Reserves Agency and stores part of Ireland's strategic fuel reserve.

The jetty can accommodate tankers up to 120,000 tonnes and stretches 1,225 metres (4,019 ft) into Belfast Lough.

== Ownership ==
Cloughan Point was constructed and opened under the ownership of Northern Ireland Electricity in 1979. Ownership was transferred to LCC Group in 2017.

== Campaign against expansion ==
LCC Group, the site's current owners, announced plans to develop the facility into a terminal for the importation and distribution of heavy fuel oil into Northern Ireland. This has been met with resistance from local residents and Translink, Northern Ireland's public transport operator, who have stated they believe it would interfere with their plans to electrify the nearby Larne-Belfast railway line.
