= Esso Refinery, Milford Haven =

Former oil refinery in Wales

Coordinates: 51.713889°N 5.077778°W

Esso Refinery
- Interactive map of Esso Refinery
- Location: Herbrandston, Milford Haven, Pembrokeshire, United Kingdom

Refinery details
- Operator: Esso
- Opened: 1960
- Closed: March 1983
- No. of employees: 350

The Esso Refinery at Milford Haven was an oil refinery situated on the Pembrokeshire coast in Wales. Construction started in 1957 and the refinery was opened in 1960 by the Duke of Edinburgh. Construction cost £18 million and the refinery had the initial capacity to process 4.5 million tons of crude oil a year.

== Background ==
As originally conceived the refinery worked in conjunction with Esso's older, larger refinery at Fawley on Southampton Water. Milford Haven refinery supplied the west coast and Fawley the rest of the country. Milford Haven also supplemented Fawley's fuel oil deliveries to the London area. The refinery shipped semi-refined heavy gas oil to Fawley for further refining. There were also shipments to Ireland and northern Europe. Most of the refinery's crude came from the Persian Gulf shipped in tankers such as the Esso Scotia of 249,952 deadweight tons.

== Design ==
The Milford Haven refinery was a 'simple' refinery designed to produce a small range of products, these included:

- Propane
- Butane
- petrols
- turbo jet fuels
- auto diesel
- gas oil
- fuel oils

The refinery was designed to blend into the area. Storage tanks were located within folds of the landscape, A ground flare was provided to eliminate the visual intrusion of an elevated flare.

The jetty was 1200 yards long extending into the haven.

The refinery occupied an area of 375 acres.

Air cooling by fans was used to cool oil products, these reduced the amount of water that was required to be handled.

The refining distillation capacity over the operational life of the refinery was as follows.

Esso Refinery, Milford Haven refining capacity
Year	Capacity (million tonnes per year)
1960	4.5
1963	4.8
1964	6.3
1965	6.3
1972	6.3
1974	15.0
1975	15.0
1979	8.7

The labour force was 350 upon opening in 1960 and had fallen to 280 by 1970. The peak labour force during construction was 3,500.

Most of the product from the refinery, about 95 per cent, was sent out by ship. However, the refinery was connected to the national rail network. Trains carrying liquefied gas were sent to the Midlands and Scotland. During the period January to June 1969, there were 656 ships delivering to or from the Esso refinery, handling 2.81 million tons of oil products.

== Closure ==
The refinery closed down in March 1983. Today, the site has been converted by the owners ExxonMobil into the South Hook LNG terminal.

== See also ==
- Gulf Refinery, Milford Haven
- Milford Haven Refinery, owned by Amoco/Murco
- Pembroke Refinery, owned by Texaco
- Oil refineries in the United Kingdom
