= Pembroke Refinery =

Oil refinery in Wales

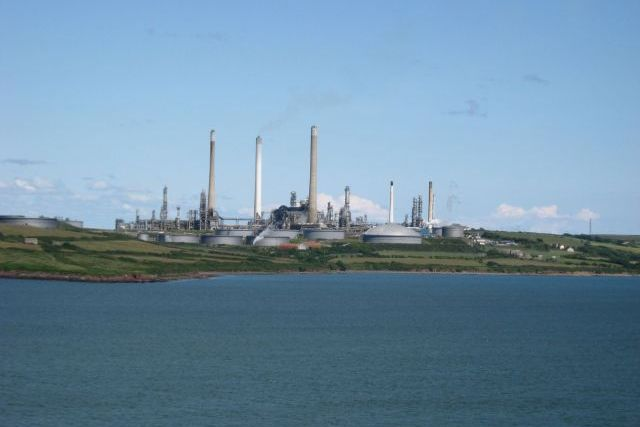

- Pembroke Refinery in Pembrokeshire
- Location: Pembroke, Pembrokeshire, UK; 51.686°N 5.029°W

Refinery details
- Owner: Valero
- Opened: 1964
- Capacity: 220,000 barrels per day (35,000 m^{3}/d)
- No. of employees: 700 (2000)

The Pembroke Refinery is an oil refinery situated on the Pembrokeshire coast in Wales at Rhoscrowther in the community of Angle, owned by the American Valero Energy. It first came on stream in 1964 and was Regent/Texaco's only British refinery. The refinery occupies a prominent position on the south bank of the Milford Haven Waterway and can be seen for many miles. Around a quarter of the site is within the Pembrokeshire Coast National Park which was created in 1952.

== History ==
The refinery came on stream in 1964. It was initially owned by the Regent Oil Company, a large domestic marketer of Trinidad-produced oils. Regent was fully acquired by Texaco in 1956 (although the brand name was only phased out in the UK in favour of Texaco in the late 1960s).

When it first came on-stream most of the crude oil for the refinery came from the Middle East with some from Libya, Venezuela and Trinidad. Products were shipped to all parts of the UK, with 96 per cent going by ship as there was no rail link to the national rail network.

Pembroke refinery also supplied fuel oil to the nearby oil-fired 2,000 MW Pembroke power station (commissioned in 1968).

Chevron acquired Texaco in 2000. Valero Energy Corporation bought the refinery from Chevron in 2011.

In August 1992, Texaco offered to purchase the entire village of Rhoscrowther which lies immediately adjacent to the refinery. Many of the residents accepted the offer – especially after a large explosion which occurred two years later – which included their properties being purchased at market price plus reasonable expenses. Once the properties were acquired by the refinery, they were demolished. Today, only five houses, a 14th-century church and a farm are all that remain of Rhoscrowther.

The historical refining distillation capacity was as follows.

Pembroke refinery distillation capacity
Year	Capacity (million tonnes per year)
1965	5.1
1972	7.0
1975	9.0
1979	9.0
1985	9.0
1990	9.0
1995	9.0
2000	9.25
2005	9.25
2010	10.5

== Production units ==
The refinery has a fluid catalytic cracking unit that came on stream in 1982. The refinery also has an HF Alkylation unit, catalytic reforming unit and three hydrotreating type units.

Pembroke refinery has the capability of refining high Total Acid Number crude oils like Captain and Doba crudes.

== Incidents ==
- At around 13:00 on 24 July 1994, twenty-six people were injured when a large explosion ripped through the plant. The blast's shockwave shook windows, doors and damaged properties within a 10-mile radius and was heard up to 40 miles away. Shortly before the explosion, a dry lightning storm in the area had caused disturbances at the plant. The resulting fire took several hours to extinguish with fire appliances being drafted in from as far away as Swansea and Cardiff. In all, over 130 firefighters assisted.
- Just after 20:00 on 15 February 1996, a crude oil tanker, the Sea Empress, en route to the refinery from the North Sea struck rocks off St. Ann's Head just four miles from the refinery's jetty on the Milford Haven Waterway. The tanker remained stuck on the rocks for four days and spilled 73,000 tonnes of oil – resulting in one of Britain's worst ever environmental disasters.
- In September 2000, during nationwide fuel protests, the gates to the refinery were blockaded by hauliers protesting at increasing petrol prices (then 80 pence per litre). Shortly after the protests, the refinery placed wooden stakes in the verges around the gates and perimeter fence to prevent vehicles parking there.
- At 20:55 on 24 March 2005, a fire broke out at a crude oil storage tank during a lightning storm. The blaze was fought by fifty firefighters and took just under an hour to extinguish. No injuries were reported.
- At 18:20 on 2 June 2011, a 730 cubic metre storage tank exploded killing four refinery workers and seriously injuring a fifth. Ten fire and rescue appliances attended the scene, along with many other emergency services. The fire was extinguished within 90 minutes.

== See also ==
- Milford Haven Refinery
- Gulf refinery, Milford Haven
- Esso refinery, Milford Haven
- Oil refineries in the United Kingdom
- List of oil refineries
