= Milford Haven Refinery =

Former oil refinery in Wales, United Kingdom

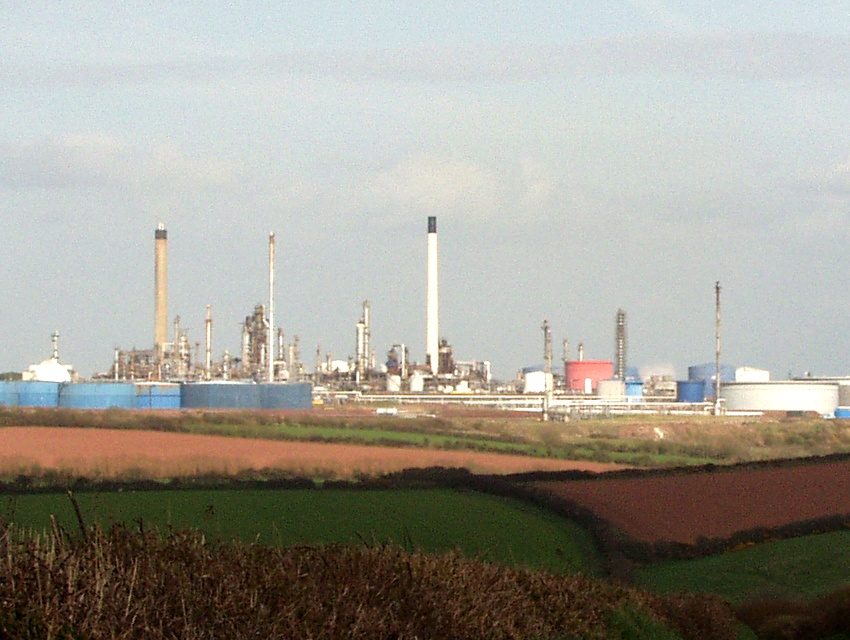
- Milford Haven Refinery in 2006

- Milford Haven Refinery in Pembrokeshire
- Location: Milford Haven, Pembrokeshire, Wales; 51°44′06″N 5°03′56″W

Refinery details
- Owner: Murco
- Opened: 1973
- Closed: 2014
- Capacity: 108,000 barrels per day (17,200 m^{3}/d)
- No. of employees: 370 (2011)

Milford Haven Refinery was an oil refinery situated on the Pembrokeshire coast in Wales. The refinery began operating in 1973 under Amoco's ownership, but in its final years it was owned by Murco. The closure of the refinery was announced in November 2014. The site was sold to Puma Energy in 2015 for use as a petroleum storage and distribution terminal.

== History ==
Milford Haven Refinery is situated on a 1,200-acre site near Milford Haven. The refinery began operations in 1973 under Amoco's ownership. A major upgrade was carried out in 1981, during which a catalytic cracker was added. Since then, additional units have been installed, notably a naptha isomerisation unit and a hydrodesulphurisation unit.

In August 1983, a major boilover fire occurred, requiring 150 firemen, 50 fire engines, and two days to extinguish.

== Ownership ==
The refinery was originally owned and operated by Amoco. In 1981 Murco purchased a 30% share of the refinery. Elf bought Amoco's interest in 1990 and Elf was acquired by Total in 2000. In December 2007 Murco purchased Total's 70% interest in the refinery to become the 100% owner. In 2010 Murco expressed a desire to sell the refinery. In April 2014 the company warned that it may have to close the site, and began a consultation process with staff. In June 2014 it was reported that the refinery had been sold to the Klesch Group, safeguarding 400 jobs at the site. In November the deal fell through and it was announced that the refinery will be converted into a 'storage and distribution facility' with a loss of over 300 jobs. The refinery entered a 'shut-down' period and was decommissioned while the company looked for a new buyer.

In March 2015 the site was acquired by Puma Energy, along with three English inland terminals at Westerleigh, Theale and Bedworth. Puma Energy said it would convert the site into a petroleum storage and distribution terminal.

At 0900 BST Sunday 21 July 2019 the two large stacks were demolished via controlled explosion.

== Production ==
At the time of its closure, the refinery had an annual processing capacity of 5.5 million tonnes (108,000 barrels per day). It imported all its feedstocks from the nearby marine terminal, which was connected to the refinery primarily by underground pipeline. Refined products were distributed by road, rail, sea and pipeline to the Midlands and Manchester.

The refining units and their respective capacities were as follows:

Refining unit	Capacity barrels/day
Atmospheric Distillation	108,000
Vacuum distillation	55,000
Fluidised Catalytic cracking	37,000
Naphtha hydrotreating	18,300
Catalytic reforming	18,300
Distillate hydrotreating	74,000
Isomerization	11,300
Alkylation	6,300

== 1983 fire ==
In August 1983, an accidental fire broke out at the facility's no. 11 crude storage tank. Containing over 46,000 tonnes of oil, the tank experienced multiple boilovers, which spread the fire across the four-acre (16,000 m^{2}) containment dyke. However, the fire did not extend beyond this area. In total, 150 firefighters and 120 fire appliances were deployed to combat the blaze. Although six firefighters were injured during the two-day incident, there were no fatalities.

== See also ==
- Pembroke Refinery, Milford Haven waterway
- Esso Refinery, Milford Haven, decommissioned 1983
- Gulf Refinery, Milford Haven, decommissioned 1997
- List of oil refineries
