= Tranmere Oil Terminal =

Oil terminal in Merseyside, England

Coordinates: 53.3782°N 3.0015°W

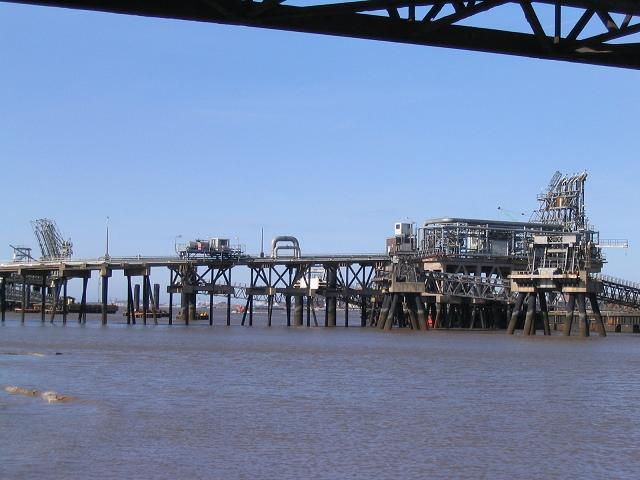
- Viewed from the shore
- Location: Birkenhead, Merseyside, England, United Kingdom

Refinery details
- Operator: Shell UK (1924–2011); Essar Oil UK (2011-present)
- Owner: Essar Energy (2011-present)
- Opened: 1960
- Capacity: 296,000 barrels per day (47,100 m^{3}/d)
- No. of employees: 960

Tranmere Oil Terminal is situated on the River Mersey, 1.5 miles (2.4 km) south of Birkenhead. It was opened on 8 June 1960 to handle vessels of up to 65,000 tons, at two berths (North and South). It is connected to the Stanlow Oil Refinery by a 15 miles (24 km) crude oil pipeline and a fuel oil pipeline. Part of the terminal occupies the site of a former ferry service to Liverpool, with the extant pier considerably modified.

The terminal is operated by the Mersey Docks and Harbour Company.

== History ==
The terminal was built jointly by Shell Oil, then the owner of Stanlow Oil Refinery, and the Mersey Docks and Harbour Board at a cost of £6 million. It was built to replace the role of the Herculaneum Dock and the later Eastham Oil Terminal which had only been inaugurated in 1954, but which did not have sufficient water depth to handle the 65,000 ton vessels that were operating by 1960.

By 2001, the terminal had two converted crude oil tanks which could handle 30,000 t (30,000 long tons). These were used for the storage of crude oil from the Foinaven oilfield.

== Current operations ==
All the crude oil feedstock for Stanlow Oil Refinery is delivered via the Tranmere terminal. The terminal is capable of handling vessels of up to 65,000 tonnes, and cargo sizes up to 170,000 tonnes on part laden Very Large Crude Carriers (VLCCs).

Tranmere handles 140 ships every year, carrying a total of 9 million tonnes of crude oil.

The size and operating pressure of the pipelines between Tranmere and Stanlow are as shown:

Tranmere to/from and Stanlow pipelines
Service	Crude oil	Fuel oil
Length	15 mile, 24 km	15 mile, 24 km
Diameter	24/28 inch, 610 mm	16 inch, 400 mm
Pressure	650 psi, 45 bar	650 psi, 45 bar

The minimum water depth at Tranmere is 40 ft. (12.2 m), and there is a tidal range of 30 ft. (9.14 m).

== See also ==
- Oil terminals in the United Kingdom
- UK oil pipeline network
