= Oil terminals in the United Kingdom =

Oil terminals are key facilities for the import, export, storage, blending, transfer and distribution of oil and petroleum products. Many terminals are located at coastal sites, such as Teesside and the lower Thames, to allow the offloading and loading of coastal shipping. Inland terminals, located around major cities, such as Birmingham and Manchester, facilitate the distribution of products to local industrial and commercial users. Many terminals have road tanker loading equipment for local distribution of products such as petrol, diesel, and heating oil. The terminals are connected through a network of underground pipelines to enable the transfer of oil and refined products across Britain.

== List of oil terminals in the United Kingdom ==
The following is a list of oil and petroleum product terminals in the UK

Acronyms used in the list include:

- BPA British Pipelines Agency
- CLH Compañía Logística de Hidrocarburos
- GPSS Government Pipelines and Storage System
- LCC Lissan Coal Company
- OPA Oil and Pipelines Agency
- PSD Petroleum Storage Depot

Oil terminals in the United Kingdom
Terminal	Location (County or Unitary Authority)	Operator	Facilities and operations	References
Aberdeen	Aberdeen City	Certas Energy	Storage	
Aberdeen	Aberdeen City	Asco Oils	Storage, 31 tanks, total 26,880 m³	
Aldermaston	West Berkshire	GPSS	Decommissioned	
Angle Bay	Pembrokeshire	BP	Crude oil tanker offloading facility, tanks in Fort Popham and Kilpaison, Angle Bay, transfer of crude to former Llandarcy Refinery by pipeline. Terminal and pipeline decommissioned 1986	
Avonmouth	Bristol	Valero	Storage, 8 tanks, Gasoline, diesel, kerosene and gas oil	
Avonmouth	Bristol	Esso	Storage 190 tanks	
Bacton	Norfolk	Operated by BPA	Gas terminal, condensate separation, storage and export by pipeline to North Walsham	
Belfast	Belfast	Valero	Storage, 26 tanks	
Belfast	Belfast	Exolum (formerly Inter Terminals)	Storage, 50 tanks, 65,216 m³	
Belfast	Belfast	Puma Energy	Storage, 20 tanks, 155,000 m³	
Berwick Wood	South Gloucestershire	CLH Pipeline System	Storage and pumping	
Birmingham	Birmingham	ExxonMobil, Esso	Storage, 17 tanks, 50,00 m^{3}	
Blyth	Northumberland	Geos Group	Storage, 15 million litre capacity	
Bramhall	Greater Manchester	CLH Pipeline System, Exolum	Storage and pipeline transfer, 7 partly buried tanks	
Brighton (Shoreham)	Brighton & Hove	Local Fuel	Storage and road tanker loading	
Buncefield	Hertfordshire	BP	Storage	
Campbeltown	Argyll and Bute	Operated by OPA	Supports Royal Navy	
Canvey Island	Essex	Oikos Storage	Ship loading, offloading, storage	
Cardiff	Cardiff	Greenergy	Rail fed	
Cardiff	Cardiff	Prax Petroleum		
Cardiff	Cardiff	Valero	Import of road fuels, including petrol, ultra low sulphur diesel (ULSD), biofuels, and heating fuels, for distribution	
Carrington	Greater Manchester	Essar Oil UK	On Manchester ship canal, ship loading offloading, propylene	
Cloghan Point	Antrim	LCC Group	Storage, 4 tanks, fuel oil for Ballylumford and Kilroot power stations.	
Clydebank	West Dunbartonshire	Exolum (formerly Inter Terminals)	Storage, 25 tanks, 56,257 m³	
Colnbrook	London Borough of Hillingdon	BP, operated by BPA	Rail offloading	
Cowes	Isle of Wight	MFG		
Cruden Bay	Aberdeenshire	Ineos	Booster station, oil from offshore and Natural Gas Liquids (NGL) from St Fergus via pipelines, sent to Kinneil terminal by pipeline	
Dalston	Cumbria	Standard Fuel Oils	Rail & road offloading	
Dagenham	Greater London	Stolthaven Terminals	Ship offloading, storage 60 to 11,000 m^{3}, tanker loading	
Dalmeny	Edinburgh	Ineos	Crude storage and ship loading	
Eastham	Cheshire West & Chester	Exolum (formerly Inter Terminals)	Storage, 157 tanks, 325,198 m³	
Ellesmere Port	Cheshire West & Chester	Stanlow Terminals (was Essar Oil UK)	Stanlow Oil refinery storage	
Falmouth	Cornwall	World Fuel Services	Storage, 27 tanks, 70,000 m³	
Fawley	Hampshire	ExxonMobil, Esso	Oil refinery storage	
Finnart Ocean	Argyll and Bute	Petroineos Fuels	Storage and pipeline transfer to Grangemouth	
Flotta oil terminal	Orkney Islands	Repsol Sinopecuk	Oil by pipeline from offshore, export by ship. Capacity 500,000 barrels per day, commissioned December 1976, produces stabilised crude and propane	
Furzebrook	Dorset	BP	Rail loading from Wytch Farm (facility decommissioned)	
Garelochhead	Argyll and Bute	Operated by OPA	Supports adjacent Naval Base	
Gatwick Airport	West Sussex	Operated by BPA	Distribution	
Goostrey	Cheshire East	Shell	Built in 1955 by Shell connected to GPSS, decommissioned	
Gosport	Hampshire	Operated by OPA	Supports Gosport Naval Base	
Grain	Kent	BP	Ship offloading, rail loading	
Grangemouth	Falkirk	Exolum (formerly Inter Terminals)	Storage, 46 tanks, 112,892 m³	
Grangemouth	Falkirk	Petroineos	Oil refinery	
Grangemouth	Falkirk	E. D. & F Man Terminal UK	Storage, 23 tanks, 15,900 m³ decommissioned?	
Grays	Thurrock	Exolum (formerly Inter Terminals)	Ship offloading, storage 310,000 m^{3} in 51 tanks 1,700 to 20,800 m^{3}, road tanker loading. Typical storage gasoline, ethanol, ester, ultra low sulphur diesel, dyed gas oil, blended biodiesel and Jet A1 kerosene	
Great Yarmouth	Norfolk	Asco Oils	Storage, 35 tanks 11,034 m³	
Hallen	South Gloucestershire	CLH Pipeline System, Exolum	Storage and pumping	
Hamble	Hampshire	BP	Supply by pipeline from Fawley refinery, and 16-inch pipeline from Wytch Farm, export by pipeline and tanker filling	
Harwich	Essex	Haltermann Carless	Oil refinery, condensate trains from North Walsham	
Haydock	Lancashire	Shell-Mex and BP	Storage and distribution, opened 1969 closed c.1980	
Heathrow airport	London Borough of Hillingdon		Storage and distribution	
Holybourne	Hampshire	Star energy	Rail loading (not regularly used)	
Holyhead	Anglesey	World Fuel Services	Storage and tank loading	
Humber	North Lincolnshire	Phillips 66	Refinery	
Hythe	Hampshire	Esso		
Immingham	North Lincolnshire	Exolum (formerly Inter Terminals)	Storage, 240 tanks, 628,354 m³	
Immingham	North Lincolnshire	Phillips 66	Storage, tanker loading, rail tanker loading	
Inverness	Highland	Certas Energy	Storage, 20 tanks	
Jarrow	Tyne and Wear	Phillips 66	Storage, 17 tanks, 45,000 m³	
Kingsbury	Warwickshire	Essar Oil UK / Shell Valero Phillips 66 / Total	14 tanks, 100 million litres, co-mingled product, eight vehicle loading gantries	
Kingston upon Hull	Kingston upon Hull	IBL Bulk liquids	Storage, 120 tanks, 34,500m^{3}	
Kinneil	Falkirk	Ineos	Crude Oil processing, original capacity 500,000 barrels per day. Products: stabilised crude, propane and butane. Commissioned Autumn 1975	
Lerwick	Shetland	Certas Energy		
Lerwick	Shetland	Petersons		
Lindsey	North Lincolnshire	Total Lindsey Oil Refinery	Oil refinery	
Lindsey	North Lincolnshire	Phillips 66		
Liverpool	Merseyside	World Fuel Services	Storage, 29 tanks, 50,527 m³	
Loch Ewe	Highland	Operated by OPA	Supports Royal Navy	
Loch Striven	Argyll and Bute	Operated by OPA	Supports Royal Navy	
Londonderry	County Londonderry	LCC Group	Storage, 11 tanks, capacity of 86,000 tonnes	
Manchester	Greater Manchester	Valero	Trafford Wharf on Manchester Ship Canal, storage	
Milford Haven	Pembrokeshire	Puma Energy	Storage, 55 tanks, 1,500,000 m³	
Milford Haven	Pembrokeshire	Valero	Distribution terminal associated with oil refinery	
Mossmorran	Fife	ExxonMobil	Natural Gas Liquids (NGL) condensate processing	
Nigg	Highland	Repsol Sinopec	Built in 1979 to accept Beatrice crude via pipeline	
Northampton	Northamptonshire	Essar Oil UK	8 storage tanks, 4 ethanol tanks, total storage 28.6 million litres, 5 loading bays	
North Shields	Tyne and Wear	Esso	Decommissioned, blown up by the IRA	
North Tees	Redcar and Cleveland	Navigator Terminals	Storage, 36 tanks, 850,000 m³	
North Walsham	Norfolk	Operated by BPA	Rail loading condensate by pipeline from Bacton	
Pembroke	Pembrokeshire	Valero	Oil refinery	
Peterhead	Aberdeenshire	Asco Oils	Storage, 17 tanks, 35,139 m³	
Plymouth	Devon	Valero	Storage, 10 tanks	
Plymouth	Devon	Greenergy	Storage, 40 million litres	
Purfleet	Thurrock	ExxonMobil, Esso	Ship offloading storage and road tanker loading	
Riverside	Stockton on Tees	Exolum (formerly Inter Terminals)	Storage, 22 tanks, 65,150 m³	
Runcorn	Cheshire	Inter Terminals	Storage, 4 tanks, 23,804 m³	
Saffron Walden	Essex	CLH Pipeline System	Party buried tanks	
Sandy	Bedfordshire	GPSS	Decommissioned	
Seal Sands	Stockton on Tees	Exolum (formerly Inter Terminals)	Storage, 116 tanks, 246,604m3	
Seal Sands	Stockton on Tees	Navigator Terminals	Storage, 168 tanks, 287,000 m³	
Seal Sands	Stockton on Tees	ConocoPhillips	Fed from Norpipe, capacity 1,000,000 barrels per day, fractionation, produces stabilised crude, ethane, propane, butane and isobutane, commissioned Autumn 1975	
Shell Haven	Thurrock	Shell UK oil products Ltd	Aviation fuel, ship offloading, storage, road tanker loading, export via 2 pipelines. 16 tanks at Haven North total 10,700 m^{3}, 4 tanks total 27,000 m^{3} at Haven South	
Shoreham	Sussex	Local Fuel		
Staines	London Borough of Hounslow	ExxonMobil, Esso	Also called Esso West London oil terminal. Storage, 25 tanks, aviation fuel supply from Fawley, supply to Heathrow	
Stanlow refinery	Cheshire West & Chester	Essar Oil UK	Oil refinery	
Stansted airport	Essex		Storage and distribution, 3 × 6300 m^{3} tanks and 2 × 150 m^{3} tanks, supply from Saffron Walden	
Sullom Voe	Shetland	Enquest	Oil by pipeline from offshore, export by ship, original capacity 3,000,000 barrels per day, commissioned Spring 1978. Products: stabilised crude, propane and butane	
Teesside oil terminal	Middlesbrough	ConocoPhillips	Fed from Norpipe, capacity 1,000,000 barrels per day, fractionation, produces stabilised crude, ethane, propane, butane and isobutane, commissioned Autumn 1975	
Tetney marine terminal	Lincolnshire	Phillips 66	Supply from monobuoy, 10 large storage tanks, discharge to Humber refinery. Located 53°30’00”N 0°00’03”E	
Thames	Thurrock	Navigator Terminals	Ship offloading, 86 tanks, total 378,000 m^{3}, road tanker loading	
Thames Oilport	Essex	Greenergy / Shell	Ship offloading, storage, tanker loading	
Thanckes	Devon	Operated by OPA	Supports Devonport Naval Base	
Theale	West Berkshire	Puma Energy	Storage, 9 tanks, 9,288 m³	
Thetford	Norfolk	Oil NG	Supplies RAF and USAF airbases in Suffolk and Norfolk	
Torksey	Lincolnshire	Shell (UK) Ltd	Railway siding off Gainsborough line, east of Cottam operational 1988, demolished by 1998	
Tranmere	Merseyside	Stanlow Terminals (formerly Essar Oil UK)	Ship offloading, crude oil	
Tyne	Tyne and Wear	Exolum (formerly Inter Terminals)	Storage, 62 tanks, 57,014 m³	
Walton on Thames	Surrey	GPSS	Tanks decommissioned, Pump station extant	
Welton	Lincolnshire	International Petroleum / Igas Energy (formerly BP Developments 1986)	Gathering station for local oil fields (Welton, Scampton North, etc.) loading facilities for rail export	
Westerleigh	South Gloucestershire	Puma Energy	Storage, 14 tanks, 15,237 m³	
West Thurrock	Thurrock	Navigator Terminals	Ship offloading, storage, 86 tanks, 378,000 m^{3}, road tanker loading	

== See also ==
- Oil Terminal
- UK oil pipeline network
- Oil terminals in Ireland
- CLH Pipeline System
- Oil and Pipelines Agency
- For details of UK gas terminals see individual articles: Bacton, CATS, Easington, Rampside, St Fergus, Theddlethorpe (closed).
- For details of UK Liquefied Natural Gas (LNG) terminals see individual articles: Grain LNG, South Hook LNG terminal.
