= Energy Institute =

Engineering society based in the UK

- Abbreviation: EI
- Formation: 2003
- Legal status: Not-for-profit organisation
- Purpose: Support to people working in energy
- Headquarters: 61 New Cavendish Street, London
- Location: UK
- Region served: UK
- Members: around 20,000
- President: Andy Brown
- Website: www.energyinst.org

The Energy Institute (EI) is a professional organization for engineers and other professionals in energy-related fields. The EI was formed in 2003 by the merger of the Institute of Petroleum (dating back to 1913) and the Institute of Energy (dating back to 1925). It has an international membership of about 20,000 people and 200 companies. Its main office is at 61 New Cavendish Street, London. EI is a registered charity with a Royal Charter.

In the United Kingdom, EI has the authority to establish professional registration for the titles of Chartered Engineer, Incorporated Engineer, and Engineering Technician, as a licensed member institution of the Engineering Council. It is also licensed by the Society for the Environment to award Chartered Environmentalist status.

== Formation ==
In 2003 the Institute of Petroleum and the Institute of Energy merged to form the Energy Institute. The offices of the Institute of Petroleum became the offices of the combined organization, and the offices of the Institute of Energy in London were closed.

=== History of The Institute of Petroleum ===
The Institute of Petroleum was formed in 1913 as The Institution of Petroleum Technologists (IPT). The first president was Boverton Redwood, and the second president was John Cadman; the IPT named its Cadman Award in his honour. In 1938 the organization expanded to cover the oil and gas industry and was renamed The Institute of Petroleum (IP).

=== History of the Institute of Energy ===
The Institution of Fuel Economy Engineers was founded in 1925, and the Institution of Fuel Technology in 1926. The two merged in 1927 as the Institute of Fuel (IoF). The first president after the merger was Alfred Mond. The IoF named the Melchett Award in his honour. In 1979 the organization became the Institute of Energy (IoE).

== Structure ==
The EI is a registered charity, formed to promote the science of energy and fuels in all applications for the public benefit. It is governed by its council, which has a president and vice-presidents. Juliet Davenport, founder and former CEO of renewable energy supplier Good Energy, was appointed to a three-year term as president in July 2022.

The EI has several categories of membership from student to fellow, and also has corporate members. Membership is required in order to go through the professional licensing procedures the organization supervises.

== Publications ==
The official journal of EI is the Journal of the Energy Institute. The journal is published by Elsevier.

EI also publishes two membership magazines, Energy World and Petroleum Review.

Beyond its journals and magazines, the Energy Institute publishes a large portfolio of technical guidance documents, recommended practices, research reports, and IP Test Methods used throughout the energy industry. Developed through EI's technical committees and working groups in collaboration with operators, equipment manufacturers, regulators, academia, and other industry stakeholders, these publications provide practical guidance for the design, operation, inspection, maintenance, and safe management of energy facilities. They are widely used by operators, engineering contractors, consultants, equipment suppliers, laboratories, and regulatory bodies across sectors including oil and gas, refining, pipelines, fuels, hydrogen, process safety, aviation, and the energy transition.

== See also ==
- Energy in the United Kingdom
- Institution of Engineering and Technology
- Energy Technologies Institute
- Petroleum industry
- Nuclear Institute
- UK Petroleum Industry Association
