= Buncefield oil depot =

Oil depot in Hertfordshire, England, UK

Coordinates: 51°45′49″N 0°25′26″W

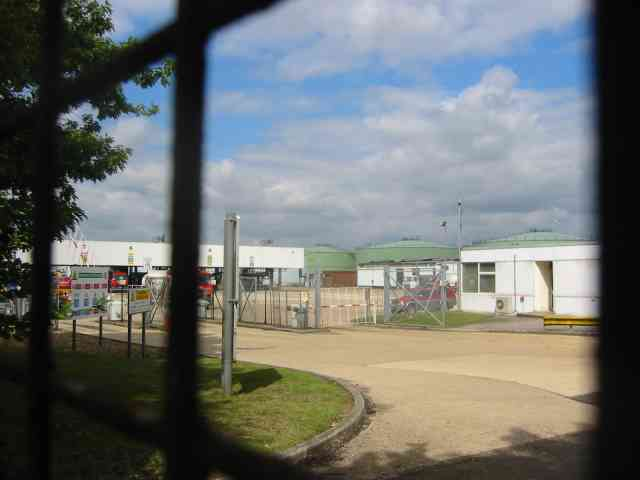
Oil Storage and filling point, four months before the 2005 fire

Buncefield oil depot is operated by Hertfordshire Oil Storage Ltd (HOSL) and officially known as the Hertfordshire Oil Storage Terminal. It is an oil depot located on the edge of Hemel Hempstead to the north of London, United Kingdom. In December 2005 a series of explosions on the site caused the largest fire in Europe since World War II.

== Construction and operation ==
The site was built in 1968 by George Wimpey for BP and Shell-Mex. A pipeline was constructed to link two Shell refineries in Stanlow in the North West of England at Ellesmere Port in Cheshire, and Shell Haven on the Thames Estuary at Stanford-le-Hope in Thurrock. The pipeline allowed "white oil" products, such as petrol and diesel, to be transported cheaply and efficiently across the country.

Along with Buncefield, a number of other pipeline-fed installations were built at the same time. These depots were always shared by the oil companies who have benefited together from the lower costs compared with other transportation methods. However, when they opened, such depots, including Buncefield, sometimes became difficult to manage from an industrial relations perspective. Drivers and other operatives from different oil companies, but members of the same Trades Union, usually the Transport and General Workers Union, were able to coordinate their industrial action more effectively by being on the same site as one another. In 1990 a further pipeline was completed, linking the site to the Lindsey Oil Refinery in Humberside.

The terminal was the fifth largest oil depot in the UK, with pipelines to Humberside, Merseyside and Heathrow and Gatwick airports radiating from it. On 11 December 2005, a series of explosions on the site caused an explosion measuring 2.4 on the Richter scale which was described as the biggest in peacetime Europe and the biggest such explosion in the United Kingdom since the 1974 Flixborough disaster. The fire devastated over a quarter of the site.

The terminal operator is Total, which owns 60% of the depot, with Texaco owning the remaining 40%, though BP and Shell also make use of its facilities. As the fifth largest oil depot in the UK, it had a capacity of approximately 60 million Imperial gallons (273 million litres) of fuel, although it was not always at capacity. It previously filled 400 tanker lorries every day and handled around 2.37 million tonnes of oil products every year.

In March 2008 BP announced it will soon be restarting some operations at the site with the storage and supply of aviation fuel to Heathrow. BP must comply with more than 50 safety conditions including refurbished tanks and an improved alarm system.

The site consists of a northern and a southern portion, with the southern being used by BP and the northern portion being divided into 3 sectors; HOSL West, the BPA area, and HOSL East. Texaco, Total and Shell use HOSL West and HOSL East, while the BPA area is occupied by facilities of the British Pipeline Agency (BPA), mostly for aviation fuel. HOSL West was the main site in the northern portion of HOSL, and was used for storage of a variety of fuels excluding aviation fuel and kerosene, which are stored at BPA. The fire destroyed most of HOSL West and the BPA area.

== See also ==
- CLH Pipeline System
- Esso Refinery, Milford Haven
- Oil terminals in the United Kingdom
- Grangemouth Refinery
- Industry and commerce in Hemel Hempstead
- 2009 Jaipur fire
