= 2009 Jaipur fire =

Petrol fire in India

Jaipur (Indian Oil) Fire.
- 2009 Jaipur fire.
- Location: 26.9260°N 75.8235°E; Jaipur, Rajasthan, India
- Date: 29 October 2009; 7.35 PM (UTC+5.30)
- Weapon: Accidental oil blast.
- Deaths: 12
- Injuries: 300+

The Jaipur oil depot fire broke out on 29 October 2009 at 7:30 PM (IST) at the Indian Oil Corporation (IOC) oil depot's giant tank holding 8,000 kilolitres (280,000 cu ft) of petrol, in Sitapura Industrial Area on the outskirts of Jaipur, Rajasthan, killing 12 people and injuring over 300. The blaze continued to rage out of control for over a week after it started, and during that period, half a million people were evacuated from the area. The oil depot is about 16 kilometres (9.9 mi) south of the city of Jaipur.

The incident occurred when petrol was being transferred from the Indian Oil Corporation's oil depot to a pipeline. There were at least 40 IOC employees at the terminal (situated close to the Jaipur International Airport) when it caught fire with an explosion. The Met department recorded a tremor measuring 2.3 on the Richter scale around the time the first explosion at 7:36 pm, which resulted in shattering of glass windows nearly 3 kilometres (1.9 mi) from the accident site.

== 2009 fire ==
The fire was a major disaster in terms of deaths, injury, loss of business, property and man-days, displacement of people, and environmental impact within Jaipur, the capital city of the Indian state of Rajasthan and a popular tourist destination. As per eyewitnesses with factories and hotels around Indian Oil's Sitapura (Jaipur) Oil Terminal, they felt the presence of petrol vapour in the atmosphere around 4:00 p.m. on 29 October 2009. Within the next few hours the concentration of petrol vapour intensified, making it difficult to breathe. The Ayush Hotel in the vicinity of the terminal asked all its guests to vacate the hotel to avert any tragedy. Adjacent to the terminal wall was the workshop of Morani Motors (P) Limited where, per eyewitnesses, cars parked on the rooftop were thrown up into the air to about 10 feet and 35 new Hyundai brand cars were completely destroyed. The police, civil administration and fire emergency services were oblivious to the situation developing in the Indian Oil Terminal.

Around half past six, the staff in the terminal who had contained the leak and flow of petrol panicked and reported the matter to nearby Sanganer Sadar Police Station. Within the next 30 minutes, the local police chief and District Collector arrived in the area along with the terminal's general manager, but with no plan to deal with the situation. The nearby industrial workers, which were running second shifts, were cautioned to vacate the area.

At 7:35 p.m. a huge ball of fire and a loud explosion broke out, engulfing the leaking petrol tank and other nearby petrol tanks with continuous fire, with flames rising 30–35 m (98–115 ft) and visible from a 30 km (19 mi) radius. The traffic on adjacent National Highway No.12 was stopped, leading to a 20 km (12 mi) long traffic jam. The Jaipur International Airport is just 5 km (3.1 mi) away from the accident site.

Both the army and experts from Mumbai were employed on 30 October 2009 to contain the fire in the Sitapura Industrial Area. The district administration disconnected electricity and evacuated nearby areas to limit the damage.

The fire still raged on 31 October. By then, the accident had already claimed eleven lives and seriously injured more than 150 people. The District Administration and Indian Oil Corporation had no disaster management plan to deal with this kind of calamity. The local fire officers were ill-equipped to deal with fire accidents of this magnitude. They remained onlookers, and no efforts were made to breach the terminal wall to approach the kerosene and diesel tanks to cool them with water jets.

The fire was blamed on non-observance of normal safety procedures. The depot fire raged for 11 days, killed 11 people, and resulted in losses worth Rs 2.80 billion.

== 2012 fire ==
A major fire broke out at a petrol storage tank of state-owned Indian Oil Corp's (IOC) Hazira terminal in Gujarat. No casualties were reported. Local authorities and the company rushed fire tenders to douse the fire.

Officials said the fire was reported in the afternoon at one of IOC's five petrol storage tanks at the Hazira depot. The tank had held almost 5,000 kilolitres of petrol, half of its capacity, when it caught fire. Senior IOC officials rushed to Hazira to supervise operations, and an inquiry was ordered to ascertain its causes. The depot was a so-called 'white-oil terminal', housing a tank farm to store petrol and five diesel tanks.

Fire brigade personnel from Surat and nearby cities came to assist, and the IOC sent fire tenders from its Koyali refinery to help douse the fire.

"The fire has been isolated," a company official said. "A high-level team has been constituted to investigate the cause of the fire but our first priority is to put out the fire... efforts are on at war footing."

This was the second major fire at an IOC storage depot in three years.

== Inventory ==
The following products were stored in eleven tanks inside the terminal:

- Petrol (18,810 kl (664,000 cu ft))
- Kerosene (2,099 kl (74,100 cu ft))
- High Speed Diesel (39,966 kl (1,411,400 cu ft))
- Interface (2,809 kl (99,200 cu ft))

== Aftermath ==
About 12 people lost their lives due to burns and asphyxia and more than 300 suffered injuries. Many of the dead were the employees of Indian Oil Corporation.

== Disaster Management Plan ==
The Disaster Management Act 2005 envisages that each revenue District must have a Disaster Management Plan. While 31 revenue Districts of Rajasthan had placed the Disaster Management Plan on Rajasthan Government website, Jaipur District did not have any Disaster Management Plan. A Disaster Management Plan for Jaipur District has been put on Internet on 17 November 2009 (20 days after the accident took place on 29 October 2009). In the meantime, Jaipur suffered two more disasters when Swine Flu infected a number of school children, prompting the government to order closure of schools, anda Mandore Express train derailed, killing six persons and injuring more than 50 persons.

== Rajasthan State Pollution Control Board Report ==
A Legal Notice has been issued to Indian Oil Corporation for violating The Water (Prevention and Control of Pollution) Act 1974, The Air (Prevention and Control of Pollution) Act, 1981, and The Environment (Protection) Act, 1986.

== Central Pollution Control Board (CPCB) Report ==
Air pollution across Jaipur was significantly above maximum permitted limits when the Indian Oil Corporation (IOC) depot on the edge of the city caught fire. It had a significant effect on the air in Delhi and Agra, the Central Pollution Control Board (CPCB) reported. Almost 60,000 kilolitres (2,100,000 cu ft) of oil in 11 storage tanks went up in flames on the evening of 29 Oct and the blaze raged till 6 Nov.

== Investigations ==
The Petroleum Minister of India Murli Deora had appointed a 5-member committee to investigate the causes of Fire and submit its report within 60 days. The Industries & Education Institutions in Sitapura Industrial Area have filed about 150 complaints with Sanganer Sadar police station about deaths, injury and loss of property due to the negligence of Indian Oil Corporation Limited.

== Central Bureau of Investigation Case ==
Variation in stock of liquid petroleum products due to temperature variation, evaporation, handling (and also due to pilferage) result in what is known as stock loss. Percentage stock loss for every product for every depot is fixed based on historical operating data. Monitoring of stock loss is done on shift basis daily.

Abnormal variation in stock loss beyond permitted limit invites explanation and even disciplinary actions for the officers at the Depots and Terminals. The Competent Authorities for such chargesheeting for Depot level Officers for such lapses are executive director (Supplies) and Director (Marketing) who prefer to selectively issue chargesheets to defaulting officers to protect their favourites.

== First Information Report ==
The Chief Judicial Magistrate, Jaipur City, Jaipur Mr. Mahaveer Swami ordered registering of a number of First Information Report (FIR) against Indian Oil Corporation Limited officers and Civil Administration for non-performance of statutory duty and negligence.

== Civil Administration ==
The Director General of Police, Rajasthan to investigate against Mr. B. L. Soni, Inspector General of Police Jaipur Range I, Mr. Kuldeep Ranka, District Collector, Jaipur and Mr. Biju George Joseph, Superintendent of Police Jaipur (East) for commission of offences u/ss 120B, 166, 167, 201, 202, 203, 204, 217, 218, 221 IPC. The order was passed on 10 December 2009, a month after the fire got extinguished.

== Indian Oil Corporation Limited ==
As per the orders passed on 4 December 2009 by the Chief Judicial Magistrate, Jaipur Mr. Mahaveer Swami, the Police Station Adarsh Nagar, Jaipur has registered FIR 337/09 under sections 166, 304A, 511, 120B against 20 accused;

1. Indian Oil Corporation Limited (IOC), Through company secretary Mr. Raju Rangnathan,
2. Sarthak Behuria, Chairman IOC
3. B M Bansal, Director (Planning & Business Development) IOC
4. S V Narasimhan, Director (Finance) IOC
5. V C Agrawal, Director (Human Resources) IOC
6. G C Daga, Director (Marketing) IOC
7. B N Bankapur, Director (Refineries) IOC
8. Anand Kumar, Director (Research & Development) IOC
9. K. K. Jha, Director (Pipelines) IOC
10. S Sundareshan, Additional Secretary, Ministry of Petroleum & Natural Gas, & Director IOC
11. P K Sinha, Additional Secretary & Financial Advisor, Ministry of Petroleum & Natural Gas, & Director IOC
12. Prof.(Mrs.) Indira J. Parikh, Former Prof. IIM, Ahmedabad and President, FLAME, Pune, & Director IOC
13. Anees Noorani, managing director, Zodiac Clothing Company Ltd., & Director IOC
14. Michael Bastian, Former chairman & managing director, Syndicate Bank, & Director IOC
15. Dr.(Mrs.) Indu Shahani, Principal, HR College of Commerce & Economics, Mumbai and Sheriff of Mumbai, & Director IOC
16. Prof. Gautam Barua, director, Indian Institute of Technology Guwahati, & Director IOC
17. N.K. Poddar, Senior Advocate, Kolkata, & Director IOC
18. K. S. Kanoujiya Senior Terminal Manager IOC
19. Gautam Bose, general manager IOC, and
20. other unknown accused.

Section 120B: Punishment of criminal conspiracy

(1) Whoever is a party to a criminal conspiracy to commit an offence punishable with death, 2[imprisonment for life] or rigorous imprisonment for a term of two years or upwards shall, where no express provision is made in this Code for the punishment of such a conspiracy, be punished in the same abetted such offence. (2) Whoever is a party to a criminal conspiracy other than a criminal conspiracy to commit an offence punishable as aforesaid shall be punished with imprisonment of either description for a term not exceeding six months, or with fine or with both.]

Section 166: Public servant disobeying law, with intent to cause injury to any person Whoever, being a public servant, knowingly disobeys any direction of the law as to the way in which he is to conduct himself as such public servant, intending to cause, or knowing it to be likely that he will, by such disobedience, cause injury to any person, shall be punished with simple imprisonment for a term which may extend to one year, or with fine, or with both.

Illustration A, being an officer directed by law to take property in execution, to satisfy a decree pronounced in Z's favour by a Court of Justice, knowingly disobeys that direction of law, with the knowledge that he is likely thereby to cause injury to Z. A has committed the offence defined in this section.

Section 304A: Causing death by negligence Whoever causes the death of any person by doing any rash or negligent act not amounting to culpable homicide, shall be punished with imprisonment of either description for a term which may extend to two years, or with fine, or with both.]

Section 511: Punishment for attempting to commit offences punishable with imprisonment for life or other imprisonment Whoever attempts to commit an offence punishable by this Code with 1[imprisonment for life] or imprisonment, or to cause such an offence to be committed, and in such attempts does any act towards the commission of the offence, shall, where no express provision is made by this Code for the punishment of such attempt, be punished with 2[imprisonment of any description provided for the offence, for a term which may extend to one-half of the imprisonment for life or, as the case may be, one-half of the longest term of imprisonment provided for that offence], or with such fine as is provided for the offence, or with both.

== Sanganer Sadar Police Station ==
In addition to the above two more FIR 241/09 dated 2 November 2009 by Mr. Prit Pal Singh of Genus Overseas an Industrial unit in Sitapura and FIR 242/09 dated 3 November 2009 by Mr. B. L. Meharada of BLM Institute have been registered against Indian Oil by Police Station Sanganer Sadar.

== Sanganer Court ==
A city court in Sanganer has ordered registering of FIR on the complaint of Ayush Hotel Sitapura.

== Arrests ==
On 2 July 2010, eight months after the devastating fire at an Indian Oil Corp (IOC) fuel depot that killed 11 people, police arrested 9 senior company officials including its general manager on charges of criminal negligence. IOC general manager for Rajasthan Mr. Gautam Bose and 8 other officers were arrested under various sections of the Indian Penal Code (IPC) including section 304-II (culpable homicide not amounting to murder). Section 304-II of IPC carries a maximum prison term of 10 years. Those arrested in connection with the fire caused by leakage of petrol during transfer from storage tank, included chief of operations at IOC's Jaipur Office, Mr. Rajesh Sayal. The others arrested are Mr. Shashank Shekhar, Manager Operation, Mr. K S Kanojia, Senior Terminal Manager, Mr. Arun Poddar, Manager Terminal, Mr. Kapil Goyal, Deputy Manager Terminal, Mr. Ashok Gupta, Operation Officer, Mr. Kailash Nath Agarwal, Chargeman, and Mr. S S Gupta, DGM Pipeline who is presently posted in Ghaziabad. While eight accused have been enlarged on bail, Mr. Ashok Kumar Gupta is still in judicial custody after 4 months. The next hearing in the matter is fixed on 11 November 2010.

== Widows request compensation ==
Ms. Savita Saroha and Ms. Alka Kumar whose husbands Mr. S. K. Saroha and Mr. Ravindra Kumar died in the Fire on 29 October 2009 have moved to Rajasthan High Court for equitable and fair compensation. The duo allege that they were not given the compensation of Rs. 1,000,000 (One million rupees) promised by Mr. Murli Deora the Minister for Petroleum and Natural Gas, Government of India. The widows are also upset that the company Indian Oil and the arrested officers have tried to pass on blame on their husbands. They are now opposing the accused officers in High Court against quashing of First Information Report and grant of bail to them.

== Compensation ==
The State Government promptly announced a cash compensation of Rs. 2,000,000.00 to the dead and in addition Indian Oil Corporation paid Rs. 10,000,000.00 to the next of the kin of dead and varied amount of compensation between Rs. 1,000,000.00 and 2,000,000.00 to the injured. It has been decided to review the location of all Oil Terminals throughout India and shift these terminals beyond city limits within a period of next 12–18 months.

=== Sitapura Industries Association ===
The Sitapura Industries Association has 1383 units, consisting of 325 garment, 115 jewellers, 110 handicraft, and other units like chemical, cable, manufacturing, IT, BPO, Auto parts, Educational Institutes and Hospitals having an investment of over 750 billion. The Sitapura Industries Association have played an important part in shaping the economy of the State of Rajasthan and generation of employment (approximately 1,000,000 direct/indirect workers). The Sitapura Industries Association has played an important role in exports and generation of foreign exchange. That on 29 October 2009 at about 4:00 p.m. some leakage of Petrol started in IOC Terminal and by 6:00 p.m. the fumes had spread far and wide in and around the Indian Oil Corporation terminal. That a huge explosion and fire erupted at 7:35 p.m. and the noise and shock waves were so intense that it gave an impression of an earthquake to the Industries of the area. The neighbouring industries adjacent to the Indian Oil Corporation terminal suffered major structural damages, loss of inventory, equipment, and finished goods. As a consequence of the Fire and associated hazards the District Collector, Jaipur declared a 5 km. zone as dangerous area and prohibited entry of the persons and vehicles in the area. The Sitapura Industries Association claims to have lost Rs. 4000 million worth of property, equipment and inventory instantaneously on 29 October 2009. Thereafter the loss of production, dispatch and consequent loss of goodwill is valued at Rs. 2000 million per day. The industries were allowed free access to their units since 5 November 2009. The total estimated loss is valued at 18000 million. As an EPZ is part of the Sitapura Industrial Area it houses a number of export-oriented units. The peak season for the export oriented units was at handshake. Due to fire and subsequent pollution and dispersion of carbon soot particles in atmosphere almost 100% finished garments would fail in stringent quality test and would have to be dumped in the domestic market at throwaway prices. As the industries are most likely to falter on their export commitment, the loss of Goodwill will takes years to rebuild.

== Government report ==
On 10 December 2009, the Indian Minister of State of Petroleum and Natural Gas Jitin Prasada said the government ruled out a Central Bureau of Investigation probe into the November fires and informed the Lok Sabha and the Indian press that a Committee had- 'ruled out sabotage or terrorism', blamed both 'corporate neglect' and 'severe radiant heat' from the October fires, and denied any connection with a similar, but smaller blast that month in Kashmir.

== See also ==
- 2005 Hertfordshire Oil Storage Terminal fire
- Esso Refinery, Milford Haven
- Grangemouth Refinery
