= UK oil pipeline network =

United Kingdom petroleum pipeline

Oil pipeline network in England

The United Kingdom petroleum pipeline network is principally made up of three pipelines systems: the former Government Pipeline and Storage System (GPSS) now the Exolum Pipeline System; the Esso pipelines (principally the mainline and midlines), and the United Kingdom Oil Pipelines (UKOP) and associated pipelines. There are also several other lines including the Fina line built around 1990 that runs from North Lincolnshire to the Buncefield oil depot near Hemel Hempstead.

== GPSS ==
The GPSS was originally constructed between 1941 and 1944 and then extended after the war, most notably during the 1950s, 1970s and 1980s. The first commercial pipeline to be constructed in the United Kingdom was built in 1959 by Shell-Mex and BP from the GPSS depot at Walton on Thames to Heathrow Airport. This pipeline now forms part of UKOP (West London). In 1963 Esso built their own pipeline from their Fawley refinery to London Heathrow. The Esso Main and Midlines constructed in the 1970s and 1980s respectively. A section of the Esso Fawley to London pipeline, between Boorley Green, Eastleigh and Hounslow, was replaced between 2021 and 2023. For a further description see Exolum Pipeline System.

== UKOP ==
United Kingdom Oil Pipelines Act 1966
- Act of Parliament
- Parliament of the United Kingdom
- Long title: An Act to empower United Kingdom Oil Pipelines Limited to acquire lands; and for other purposes.
- Citation: 1966 c. xxix

Dates
- Royal assent: 9 August 1966

Status: Current legislation

Text of statute as originally enacted

The United Kingdom Oil Pipeline (UKOP) is an oil products pipeline opened in 1969 and connecting the two (then) Shell refineries of Stanlow (Cheshire) and Shell Haven (Thames Estuary). UKOP is owned by a consortium of five shareholders Essar Midlands Ltd, BP, Shell, Valero and Total. UKOP is administered and operated by the British Pipeline Agency (BPA), which is jointly owned by Shell and BP. As part of the UKOP network, in 1982 BPA began work a pipeline from Walton to Gatwick and this was substantively complete by the end of the year. However, in 1983 the pipeline had to be shut down and was not brought back into operation until 1984. In 1985 the UKOP pipeline from Kingsbury to Buncefield was commissioned.

UKOP transports 7.5 million tonnes of mixed products each year distributed to major oil terminals at Buncefield and Kingsbury with spurs to Northampton and Nottingham. UKOP now draws its products from Essar Stanlow in the north, with smaller volumes from tankage at Shell Haven. UKOP carries two grades of petrol, two grades of kerosene (including Jet A-1) and two grades of gas oil-diesel.

To ensure safety and integrity, the pipeline is patrolled by helicopter every two weeks.

== Petroleum product pipelines ==
A list of UK petroleum pipelines. Pipelines are multi-product lines with batches of product separated by pigs, except for single product lines where shown, for example aviation kerosene.

UK refined products pipelines
| From | To | Length (km) | Diameter (inches) | Capacity (1000 tons/month) | Operating pressure (psi) | Year constructed | Notes |
|---|---|---|---|---|---|---|---|
| Aldermaston | Newbury | | 6 | | 725 | | |
| Aldermaston | Sandy | 110 | 8/10 | 80 | 725 | 1941 | A/S line |
| Aldermaston | Walton on Thames | | 8/10 | | 725 | | |
| Alton | Gatwick airport | | 10 | | 1100 | | Aviation kerosene, operated by Shell |
| Astwood Tee | Birmingham airport | 50 | 12 | | 1200 | | Astwood Tee on Hythe to Seisdon line |
| Avonmouth | Walton on Thames | | | 80/135 | | 1941–44 | A/T line |
| Avonmouth | Aldermaston | | 8/10 | 180 + 80 | 725 | 1941 | A/A line |
| Avonmouth | Stanlow | 220 | 8/10 | 100 | 725 | 1941–42 | N/S line via Gloucester, Upton, Worcester, Stourport and Beeston Castle terminals |
| Avonmouth | Hythe/Fawley | | 6 | | 1440 | | Aviation kerosene |
| Backford | Bromborough/ Ellesmere Port | | 10 | | 725 | | |
| Backford | Misterton | 160 | 8/10 | 80 | | 1941–44 | B/M line |
| Backford/Stanlow | Manchester airport | | 10 | | 450 | 1994 | Aviation kerosene, via Plumley |
| Bacton | North Walsham | 8.3 | 6 | | 720 | 1968 | Gas condensate, owned by Shell operated by British Pipeline Authority |
| Berwick Wood | Portishead/Nailsea | | 16 | | 725 | | |
| Buncefield | Walton on Thames | | 6/8 | | 1300 | | via Longford junction (spur to Heathrow airport) Aviation kerosene |
| Cadishead | Carrington Tee | | 12 | | | | Aviation kerosene |
| Calne | Fairford//Carterton | | 6 | | 1100 | | |
| Carrington Tee | Manchester airport | | 12 | | 1400 | | Aviation kerosene |
| Claydon | Thetford | | 8 | | 1200 | | Aviation kerosene |
| Claydon | Woodbridge | | 6 | | 725 | | |
| Colnbrook | Heathrow airport | | 12 | | 200 | | Aviation kerosene |
| Former Coryton refinery now Thames Oilport | Stanlow | 394 | 10, 14 | | 1200 | 1969 | UKOP run by British Pipeline Agency, Thames-Mersey line via Buncefield terminal, Blisworth (spur to Northampton), and Kingsbury terminal |
| Falmouth | St. Mawgan | | 8 | | 1100 | | |
| Fawley | Esso West London oil terminal | 105 | 10/12 | | 1000 | 1972 | Aviation kerosene |
| Fawley | Severnside | 126 | 6 | | | | |
| Fawley | Seisdon | | 14 | | 1100 | | |
| Fawley | Shanklin | | | | | 1941–44 | F/S line |
| Grain | Nettlestead Tee | 120 | 6/8 | 80/95 | 725 | 1941–44 | Nettlestead Tee on Walton to Dungeness line |
| Hamble | Aldermaston | 65 | 8/10 | 120 | 725 | 1941–42 | R/H line |
| Hethersett | Buxton (Norfolk) | | 6 | | 725 | | |
| Hythe/Fawley | Seisdon | | | | | | Aviation kerosene |
| Inverness | Lossiemouth | | 8 | | 1100 | | |
| Kingsbury | Buncefield | | 10/12 | | 1200 | | |
| Lindsey refinery (Killingholme) | Buncefield terminal | 150 | 10 | | 1500 | 1990 | Fina line, operated by BPA, via Immingham Docks |
| Linkswood | Leuchars | | 6 | | 232 | | |
| Middlesborrough | Saltend (Hull) | 153 | 12 | 30 tons/hr | | | |
| Milford Haven | Seisdon | 234 | 16 | | | | Aviation kerosene, 'Mainline' |
| Misterton | Lincoln/Tattershall | | 8 | | 725 | | |
| Mossmorran | Stanlow | 410 | | 15 | | | Northern UK NGL-Ethylene System, via Wilton, TPEP Trans-pennine |
| Plumley | Goostrey | | 10 | | 450 | | |
| Purfleet | Gatwick airport | | 10 | | 1100 | | Aviation kerosene, Shell |
| Rawcliffe | Elvington/Northallerton | | 8 | | 725 | | |
| Saffron Walden | Stansted airport | | 6 | | 1100 | | Aviation kerosene. Built by the US Air Force in 1954 but was never commissioned. Refurbished in 1990 as part of the redevelopment of Stansted airport. |
| Saffron Walden | Hethersett | | 8 | 75 | 725 | 1941–44 | TH/N line (part) |
| Saffron Walden | Sandy | 37 | 8/10 | 95 | 725 | 1941 | TH/N/S line |
| Saffron Walden | Woodbridge | | 8 | | 1200 | | via Claydon |
| Sandy | Kelmarsh | | 8 | | 725 | | |
| Sandy | Misterton | 110 | 8/10 | 80 | 725 | 1941–43 | S/M line |
| Seisdon | Carrington Tee | 112 | 12 | | | | Aviation kerosene |
| Seisdon | Nottingham | 112 | 10, 12 | | 1400 | | 'Mainline via Kingsbury |
| Stanlow | Backford | | | | | | |
| Stanlow | Bromborough | | | 400 + 350 + 55 + 55 | | 1941–44 | Bromborough balance tanks |
| Stanlow | Killingholme | | 10/12 | | 1100 | | Former GPSS via Bramhall and Rawcliffe terminals |
| Stanlow | Kingsbury | | 10 | | 1200 | | |
| Stanlow | Runcorn | | 8 | | 1305 | | Ethylene, RSEP |
| Stanlow | Carrington | | 4 | | 652 | | Propylene |
| Stanlow | Carrington | | | | | | Ethylene, SCEP |
| Teesside | Saltend | | 12 | | 1160 | | Ethylene, TSEP |
| Tetsworth | Islip/Somerton | | 6/8 | | 725 | | |
| Thames Haven | Saffron Walden | 60 | 8/10 | 95 | 1200 | 1941–44 | TH/N line (part) |
| Theddlethorpe terminal | Killingholme refinery | | 6 | | 900 | | Theddlethorpe terminal decommissioned 2018 |
| Thetford | Ingham/Barton Mills | | 6/8 | | 725 | | Aviation kerosene |
| Thetford | Shouldham/Tattersett | | 8 | | 725 | | Aviation kerosene |
| Tranmere | Stanlow | | 16 | | 652 | | Fuel oil |
| Walton on Thames | Dungeness | | 8 | 95 | 725 | 1941–44 | T/D line |
| Walton on Thames | Gatwick airport | 36 | 10 | | 1300 | 1984 | Operated by BPA |
| Walton on Thames | Heathrow airport | | 6 | | 720 | 1959 | |
| Stanlow | Grangemouth | | | | | | North West Ethylene Pipeline, NWEP |
| Wilton | Grangemouth | | 10 | | 1390 | | Ethylene, WGEP |

== Crude oil pipelines ==
In addition to the petroleum products pipelines there are a number of crude oil pipelines transporting crude oil from offshore installations to coastal terminals and from terminals to refineries. The sources give various and conflicting lengths and capacities.

UK offshore to onshore crude oil pipelines
| From – To | Length (miles) | Diameter (inches) | Max. waterdepth (feet) | Capacity (bbl/day) | Original operator | Year commissioned |
|---|---|---|---|---|---|---|
| Beatrice – Nigg Bay | 42 | 16 | | | Britoil | 1981 |
| Bruce – Forties/ Cruden Bay line | 155 | 24 | | | Total | 1993 |
| Cormorant South – Sullom Voe | 93 | 36 | 420–540 | | Shell/Esso | 1978 |
| Ekofisk – Teesside | 220 | 34 | 220–300 | 300,000 | Phillips | 1975 |
| Forties – Cruden Bay | 106 | 36 | 430 | 550,000 | BP | 1991 (replaced 32 inch line) |
| Montrose – Forties/ Cruden Bay line | 39 | 14 | | | Amoco | 1993 |
| Ninian – Sullom Voe | 105 | 36 | 492 | 1,000,000 | BP | 1978 |
| Piper – Flotta | 130 | 30 | 480 | 560,000 | Occidental | 1976 |

UK onshore crude oil pipelines
| From – To | Length, miles | Diameter | Original operator | Year constructed | Capacity |
|---|---|---|---|---|---|
| Finnart – Grangemouth refinery | 57 (90 km) | 50 cm | BP, Ineos from 2005 | 1951 | 4.5 million tonnes/year 7 million tons/year |
| Tranmere oil terminal – Stanlow refinery | 9 (24 km) | 24 /28 inch | Shell | 1960 | linked six 20,000 tonne tanks at terminal to refinery, operating at 696 psi |
| Angle Bay Milford Haven – Llandarcy oil refinery | 62 (96 km) | 46 cm | BP | 1961 | 5 million tonnes/year 8 million tons/year |
| Tranmere oil terminal – Heysham oil refinery | 70 | 30 cm | Shell | 1966 | 2 million tons/year. Replaced an 18,000 dwt tanker supply. Decommissioned 1976 (refinery closed) |
| Tranmere – Eastham | | 12 inch | Shell | | Operating at 696 psi |
| Tetney Monobuoy – Tetney marine terminal | 3 | 36 inch | Phillips 66 | 1969 | |
| Tetney marine terminal – Humber refinery | 15 | 22 inch | Phillips 66 | 1969 | |
| Amlwch/Rhosgoch – Stanlow refinery | 79 (127 km) | 2 × 36 inch | Shell | 1974 | Decommissioned 1990 |
| Cruden Bay – Kinneil terminal | 130 | 36 inch | BP, Ineos from 2017 | 1975 | 87,000 m^{3}/day, oil from offshore Forties field and natural gas liquids from St Fergus. Booster pump stations at Netherley, Brechin and Balbeggie |

== See also ==
For details of UK gas pipelines see National Transmission System

- CLH Pipeline System
- Oil terminals in the United Kingdom
- British Pipeline Agency
