= Domino effect accident =

Accident that causes one or more consequential accidents

A domino effect accident is an accident in which a primary undesired event sequentially or simultaneously triggers one or more secondary undesired events in nearby equipment or facilities, leading to secondary accidents more severe than the primary event. Thus, a domino effect accident is actually a chain of multiple events, which can be likened to a falling row of dominoes. The term knock-on accident is also used.

Domino effect accidents are an important process safety issue affecting process plants where significant amounts of hazardous materials are stored, transported, and processed. Losses of containment that result in fires or explosions can escalate to nearby equipment, due to thermal radiation, blast overpressure or other mechanisms, thus potentially causing further fires, explosions, or toxic gas clouds.

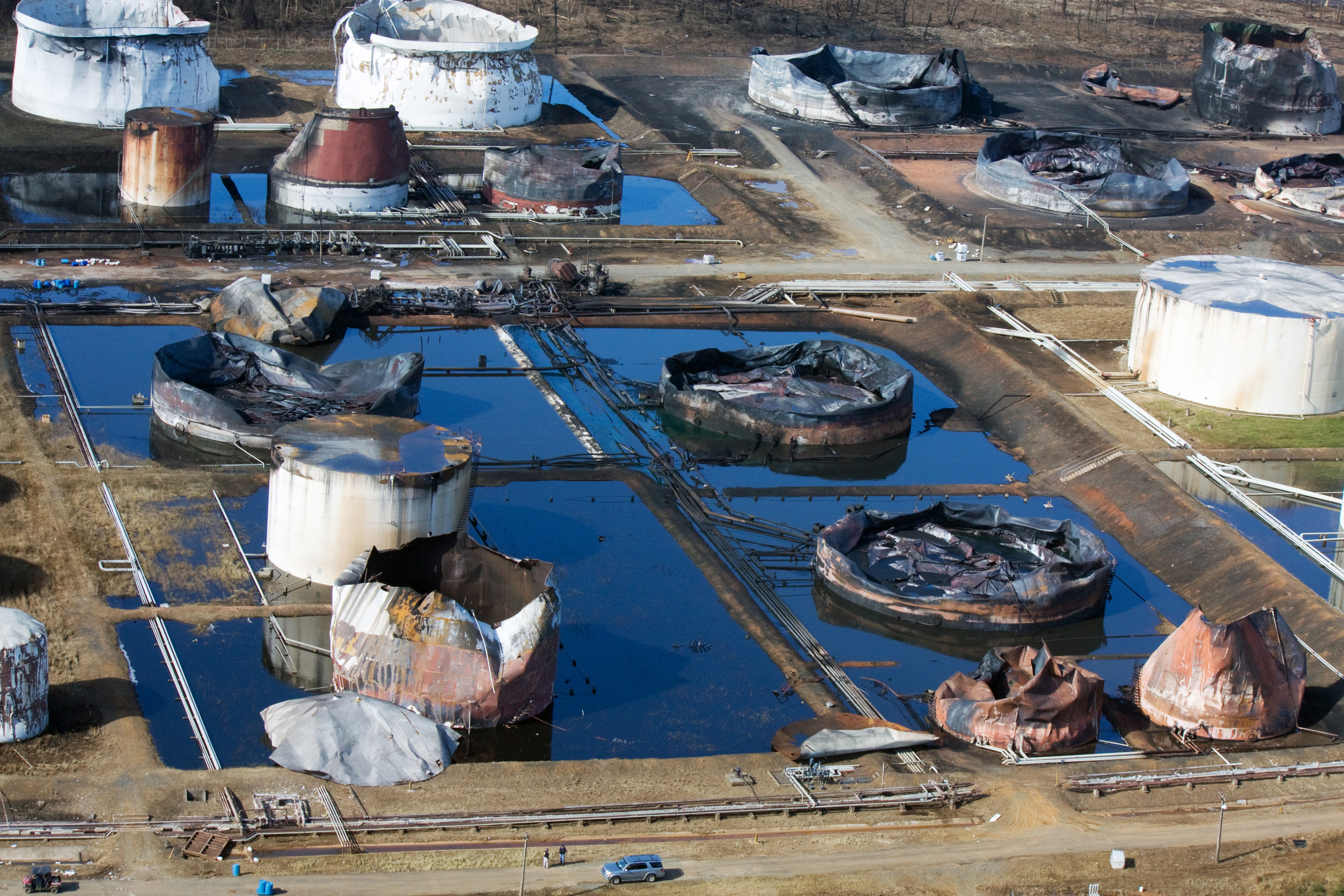
The aftermath of a domino effect on storage tanks, 2009 Cataño oil refinery fire

== Characteristics of domino effect accidents ==
The consequences of the domino effects of an accident are often more severe than the primary event. Escalation is caused by the physical effects induced by the primary event, which are referred to as escalation vectors. Domino effect accidents mainly consist of three elements: the primary scenario, the escalation vectors, and one or more secondary accidents.

=== Primary scenarios ===
The primary scenarios include various types of fire (flash fire, pool fire, jet fire, fireball, boiling liquid expanding vapor explosion (BLEVE), unconfined vapor cloud explosion (UVCE), confined explosion (CE), and mechanical explosion (ME). Normally, there is only one primary event, such as a tank fire in a gasoline storage farm. However, if the process is triggered by intentional attacks or natural disasters, multi-primary events may apply. In that case, it can be very difficult to prevent the escalation of domino effects due to the synergistic effects caused by multiple hazardous events. For example, an earthquake may lead to multiple equipment failures in a process plant, which can in turn cause further accidents.

=== Escalation vectors ===
The escalation vectors are the hazardous effects caused by the primary scenarios. The escalation vectors of pool fires, jet fires, and fireballs is thermal radiation and fire impingement. For BLEVE, ME, and VCE it is blast overpressure and fragment projection. Fire-induced domino effects are time-dependent (because the affected equipment has a certain time-to-failure), while explosion-induced domino effects are not related to time, as the failure of the affected equipment will occur instantaneously.

=== Single and multiple secondary accidents ===
If the primary scenario successfully escalates to other installations nearby, one or more secondary events occur. Escalation from the primary event to the secondary event is called the first-level escalation, while escalation from secondary event to a potential tertiary event is called second-level escalation, and so on. When lower-level event triggers multiple higher-level events, these are called parallel effects. A higher-level event caused by multiple lower-level events is a case of synergistic effects. Time-dependent escalation vectors from different sources and acting at different times may result in a synergic effect over a secondary target; this is called superimposed effects.

== Types ==
=== Intentional and unintentional domino effect accidents ===
According to whether the primary event is deliberate or not, domino effect accidents can be divided into unintentional and intentional. The primary events of unintentional domino effects are caused by accidental events (e.g., corrosion, human errors, and leakage) or natural hazards (e.g., earthquake, lightning, floods). Intentional domino effects are cause by deliberate attacks such as acts of terrorism and sabotage.

=== Fire-induced and explosion-induced domino effect accidents ===
According to the physical nature of the primary event, domino effects can be divided into fire-induced and explosion-induced. According to some sources, toxic release may also directly induce domino effects via the movement of toxic gases, e.g., if poisoning induces plant operators to errors that result in secondary accidents.

=== Internal and external domino effect accidents ===
In a chemical cluster or a process plant industrial park, there are multiple hazardous materials sites located next to each other. An accident occurring in a site may escalate to the neighboring plants. Internal domino effect accidents are those accidents that occur within a plant, while external ones are those escalating to outside the primary plant boundaries. Preventing external domino effect accidents is especially complex, as these require managing the hazard across multiple companies. Encouraging the cooperation between different neighboring companies within a cluster of sites is essential for the management of domino effect hazards.

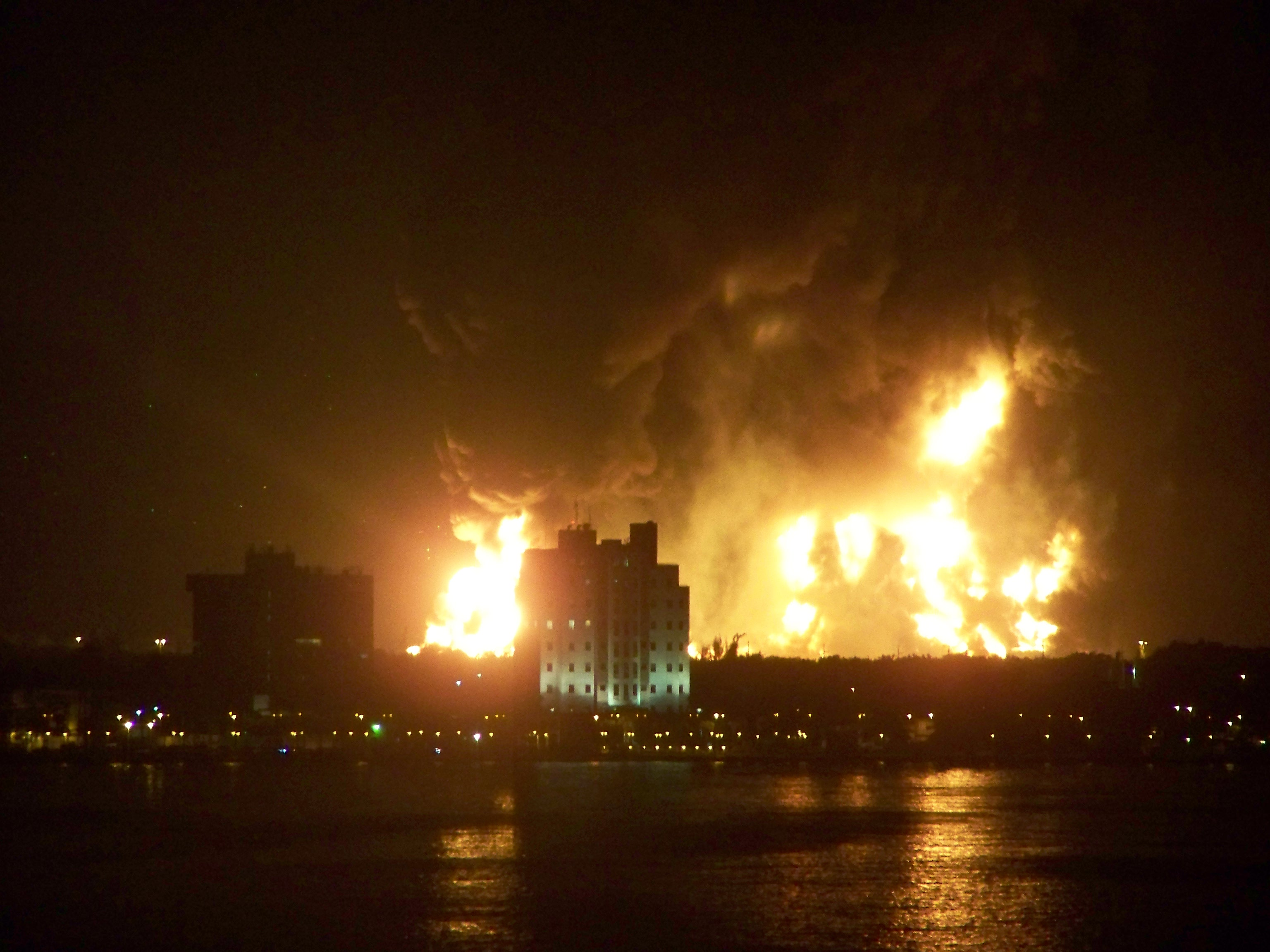
Fire raging at Cataño refinery

== Examples ==
The consequences of domino effect accidents can be much more severe than the primary events. Past process industry catastrophes that involved domino effects significantly greater than the initiating event are the San Juanico disaster, the Piper Alpha disaster, the Esso Longford disaster of 1998, the 2005 Buncefield fire, the 2009 Jaipur fire, the 2009 Cataño oil refinery fire, the 2019 Xiangshui chemical plant explosion, etc. For example, at the 2019 Xiangshui chemical plant explosion, which led to more than 78 deaths and 617 injuries, many facilities near the chemical plant where the accident started were damaged.

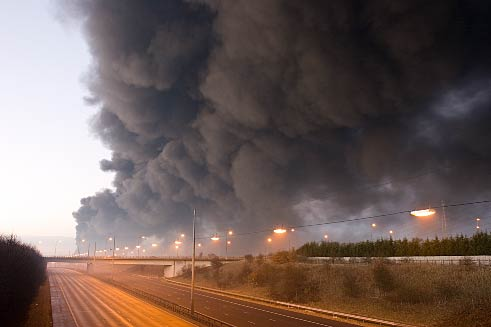
Buncefield fire seen from the M1 motorway

== Prevention and mitigation measures ==
Management of domino effects hazards focuses on one or more of three aspects: reduction of the likelihood of occurrence of the primary event; preventing the escalation of the primary event; mitigating the escalation of the primary event. The engineered and administrative safety barriers used in this context can be active, passive, or procedural and emergency measures.

=== Active protection measures ===
Active protection measures are those needing power and/or external activation to trigger their protection action. They can be used to suppress fire, such as water/foam deluge, and isolate process units, such as emergency shutdown (ESD) systems. An active protection measure usually consists of three elements: (i) a detection system, (ii) a treatment system, and (iii) an actuation system. In order to ensure the performance of active protection measures, all the above three elements should be effective.

=== Passive protection measures ===
No external activation is needed for passive protection measures. As a result, passive protection measures are generally more reliable than active ones. Fireproofing is a commonly used passive protection measure used to insulate pressure vessels from heat radiation induced by external fire. Passive fire protection increases the time-to-failure of vessels, providing more time for emergency response actions to extinguish the fire. Pressure relief valves are another example of passive protection measure.

=== Procedural and emergency measures ===
Procedures are administrative barriers for escalation prevention. Emergency measures are also administrative in nature and focus on emergency response, both within the primary site and the surrounding ones. Emergency response procedures in process plants play an important role in protecting employees, installations, and other civilians nearby. In terms of domino effects, an emergency response such as firefighting can effectively prevent the escalation of accidents by reducing heat radiation and isolating undamaged vessels. Emergency response actions require a certain time to be initiated, and emergency resources are typically limited; optimizing emergency procedures and emergency resource allocation is essential for the prevention and mitigation of domino effects.
