= Berwick, Gloucestershire =

Hamlet in the South Gloucestershire district, in the English county of Gloucestershire

Coordinates: 51.5231°N 2.6398°W

Berwick
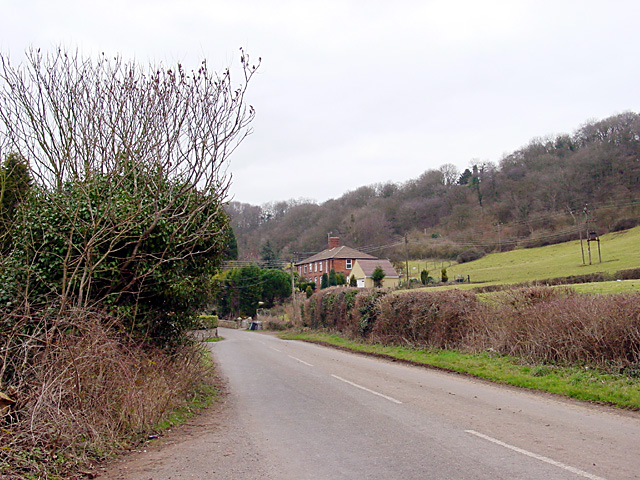

- Location within Gloucestershire
- Civil parish: Almondsbury
- Unitary authority: South Gloucestershire
- Ceremonial county: Gloucestershire
- Region: South West
- Country: England
- Sovereign state: United Kingdom
- Police: Avon and Somerset
- Fire: Avon
- Ambulance: South Western

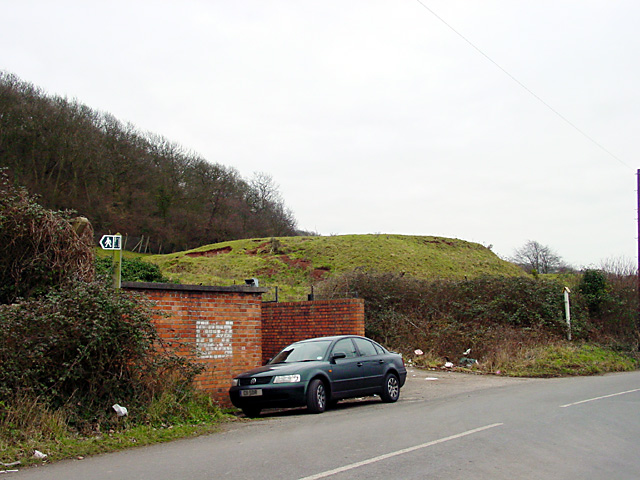
The former Berwick Wood Petroleum Supply Depot (PSD) was a storage facility built to connect to the GPSS

Berwick is a hamlet in the civil parish of Almondsbury, in the South Gloucestershire district, in the ceremonial county of Gloucestershire, England. Nearby settlements include the city of Bristol and the village of Hallen. Berwick has a business park called Sampson House Business Park and a wood called Berwick Wood. Berwick is located between the M5 motorway and the M49 motorway. There was a depot for the Government Pipelines and Storage System (GPSS) in the wood.
