= Exolum Pipeline System =

Fuel pipeline system in the UK

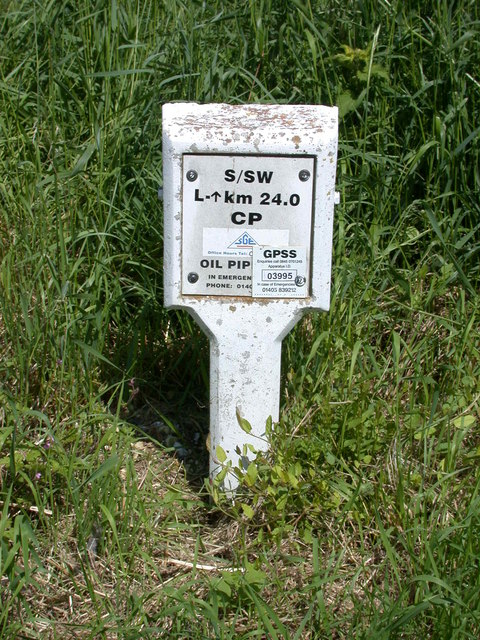
GPSS marker plate, near Heydon, Cambridgeshire. The marker text: S/SW shows marker is on the Sandy-Saffron Walden link; 24 kilometres (15 mi) is the distance from Sandy; up-arrow indicates that the normal flow is away from the observer looking at the notice

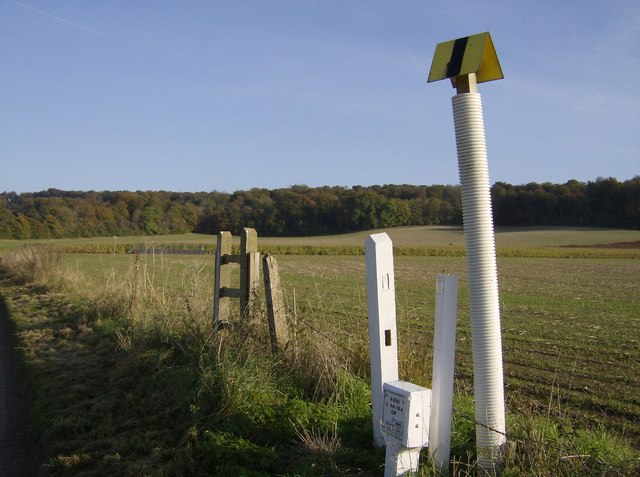
GPSS pre-World War II white marker, with post-World War II yellow/black post

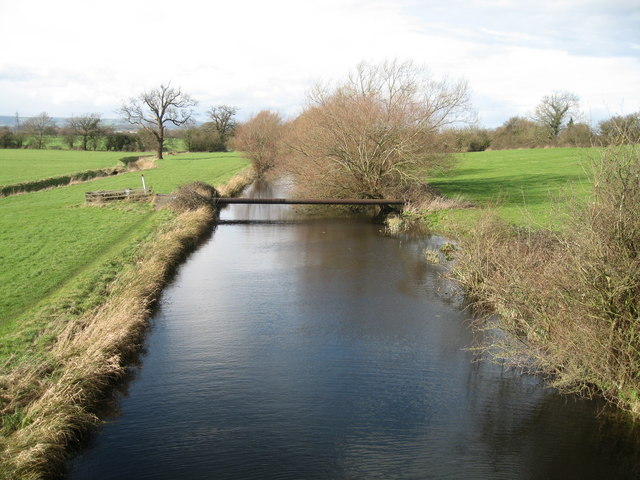
The GPSS crosses the non-navigable Stroudwater Canal, near Whitminster, Gloucestershire but will be re-routed as part of the restoration of the canal.

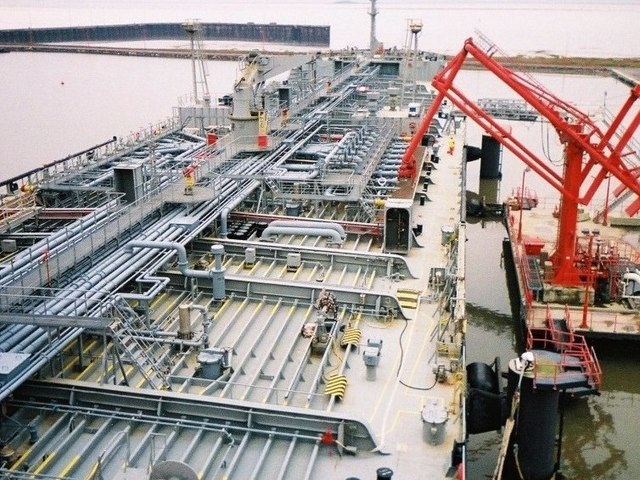
The tanker TORM VITA discharges aviation fuel at Berth 7, Royal Portbury Dock near Bristol. Known as the 'Bristol Aviation Fuel Terminal', it was managed by the Oil and Pipelines Agency, with its intake distributed by the GPSS.

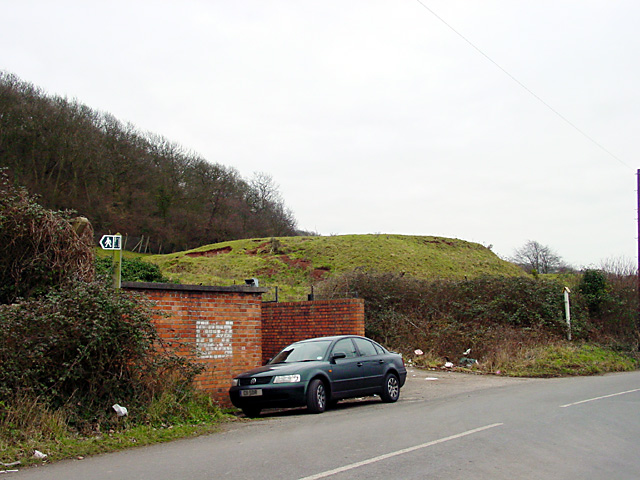
The former Berwick Wood Petroleum Supply Depot (PSD), located in Berwick, Gloucestershire, was one of the original additional storage facilities built to connect to the GPSS.

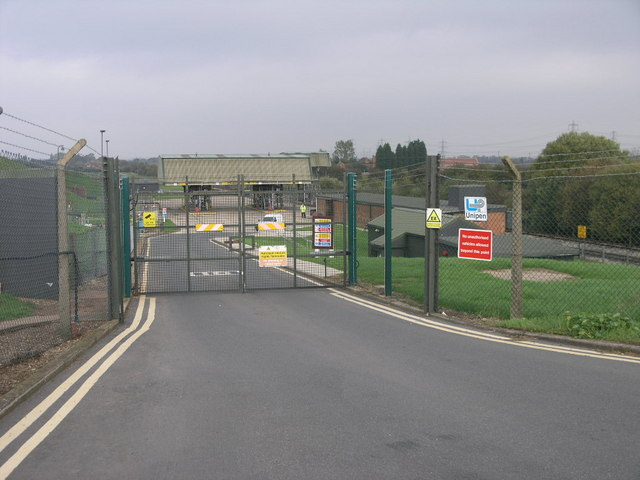
The railway-connected Misterton & Rawcliffe PSDs located in Misterton, Nottinghamshire, which is also connected to the GPSS

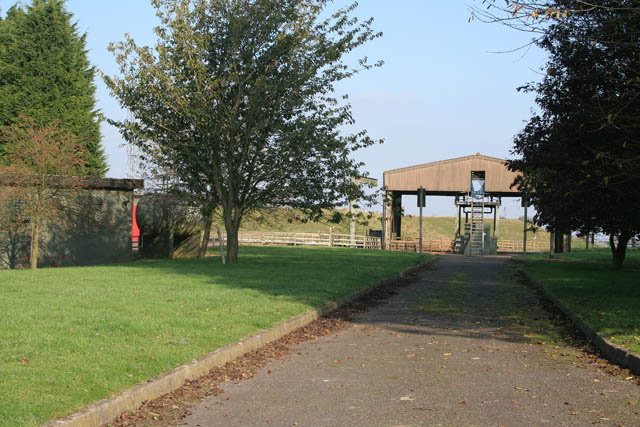
The former Stonesby PSD located in Leicestershire, now the site of an NTL transmission site and aerial

The Exolum Pipeline System, formerly the CLH Pipeline System and the Government Pipelines and Storage System (GPSS), is a fuel pipeline system in the United Kingdom. Originally constructed by the government to supply fuel to airfields in World War II, it is now owned by Exolum.

The system once consisted of over 2,500 kilometres (1,600 mi) of pipeline and more than 46 facilities. In 1989 there were 40 petroleum storage depots in operation plus large numbers of other facilities such as pump-stations, junctions, and ingress and egress points, although many of these have now been closed. It is interconnected with other commercial pipeline systems.

== Pre-World War II planning ==
As part of the planning and preparations for World War II, the Air Ministry realised that the ability to distribute aviation fuel to the Royal Air Force (RAF)'s aircraft and petrol to its ground support vehicles was essential to sustaining any battle, in which superiority would be gained mainly in the air. In 1936, the RAF possessed just 8,000 tons of fuel, a quantity thought at the time to be enough for 10 days of war—but which turned out to be about one day's supply at the war's peak.

Authorisation was given to build fuel-storage depots with semi-buried tanks that would be protected against aerial attack. Initial plans in 1936 called for a total capacity of 90,000 tons, but within two years that was increased to 800,000 tons. By the start of World War II in 1939, several new depots were operational, but no pipelines were constructed until 1941.

== National pipeline system ==
The declaration of war triggered the activation of the Petroleum Board, which controlled the country's petrol companies from Shell Mex House in London. The construction of protected storage tanks continued; most were built between 1940 and 1942.

As Great Britain began to import more fuel through west coast ports (the east coast ports were closed by German bombing), it became more difficult for the road and rail network to transfer the fuel eastwards and southwards. In April 1941 the go-ahead was given for the construction of an oil pipeline from Avonmouth, where a large number of new protected storage tanks had been constructed, to the Thames (A/T pipeline). Concern about the vulnerability of the fuel-import facilities led in 1942 to the construction of a pipeline linking the import facilities in the Stanlow area with those at Avonmouth. This was followed by the construction of a pipeline running from off the A/T pipeline to the Southampton area for the stockpiling of fuel for the possible second front (R/H pipeline). During 1943 an entire ring-main was built to link the River Mersey, the Avonmouth area, the River Thames and up to the Humber area. This was later extended into East Anglia to supply the RAF and the United States Army Air Force (USAAF).

Linked to the GPSS were the cross-channel PLUTO pipelines which ran from the Isle of Wight to Cherbourg (code named BAMBI) and from Dungeness to Boulogne (code named DUMBO). Adding to the R/H pipeline, a new pipeline was built from the Thames to Dungeness in 1943. The success of the PLUTO was limited, accounting for only 8% of the fuel delivered between D-Day and VE Day. The official history states that 'PLUTO contributed nothing to Allied supplies at a time that would have been most valuable' and 'DUMBO was more valuable, but at a time when success was of less importance.'

By war's end, the protected storage tanks had proven their value: German bombs had destroyed about 500,000 tons of above-ground tanks but only two of the protected tanks (8,000 tons), in Poole and Falmouth.

== Post-World War II ==
Immediately after the war, most of the system was mothballed. Surplus fuel was disposed of, sites were reduced to minimum manning, and the pipelines filled with water.

The system was recommissioned during the Cold War. One person working on bringing one previously mothballed storage depot back into operation related how it was buried beneath rubbish and long grass. Two new fuel importation complexes were built in the 1950s, one to the south west of Bristol and one in the Stanlow area. A very large storage depot using salt caverns was constructed in Cheshire for storing both crude and refined oils. On being recommissioned, the cross-Pennines pipeline was found to be badly corroded and in the 1950s a new pipeline was built from the Stanlow area to the Humber. New storage depots were built on this pipeline and a third new import facility was constructed on the Humber.

The first commercial usage of the system was immediately after the war to supply a depot on the River Severn from Avonmouth. In the early 1950s some aviation fuel was pumped from Avonmouth to a depot on the River Thames to supply Heathrow Airport by road tanker from there. Esso also used the network to pump aviation fuel from the Fawley refinery to the Thames depot to supply Heathrow. The late 1950s also saw a spur off one of the PLUTO pipelines, originally from the Thames to Dungeness, brought back into operation to pump fuel from the Isle of Grain to the Thames Depot. From there aviation fuel was carried to Heathrow Airport, no longer by road tanker but via the first commercial pipeline which was constructed by Shell-Mex & BP in 1959.

In 1967 an agreement was reached with Conoco for leasing five petroleum storage depots for road loading of ground fuels. These were all supplied from the Immingham refinery which was connected to the GPSS pipeline network. During the late 1970s and early 1980s two commercial road loading facilities and two additional refineries were also connected to the GPSS. There were a substantial number of depots that were not on the pipeline network. In the 1970s most of these were closed down. In the 1980s it was decided by the government that large scale strategic storage of petroleum as a civil reserve was no longer required. The salt cavities and some of the storage depots previously used for civil reserve storage were either closed or leased commercially.

The management of civil storage depots and the pipeline network initially came under the Board of Trade and then in 1942 under the Ministry of Power. This became the Department of Energy in the 1970s. In 1975 the British National Oil Corporation (BNOC) was set up and took over the running of the department's system. In 1985 the government closed BNOC but kept the GPSS and the Oil & Pipelines Agency (OPA) was set up purely to manage the GPSS. Air Ministry storage depots and spur pipelines had been managed by the ministry and later by the Ministry of Defence (MoD) but in 1989 it was decided by the government to merge these sites and pipelines with the rest of the GPSS under the management of OPA. Although the GPSS remained officially secret until the end of the Cold War, knowledge of it was in fact already in the public domain through the publication of various books and papers such as the Official History, Adams' papers and the series of articles in the Petroleum Times – 'Petroleum at War'.

Private-sector usage was encouraged, but limited; the OPA's task was to provide "maximum development of private sector usage of the GPSS, provided this did not impinge upon its primary purpose of supplying the required fuel for defence purposes and did not require capital investment from public funds." As a result, the pipeline was extended and developed to allow connection to all UK-based oil refineries and major fuel processing depots, as well as all major civilian airports (including Heathrow, Gatwick, Stansted and Manchester) during the period of the Cold War. As a result of the 2000 fuel protests, Defence Secretary Geoff Hoon instructed the MoD to plan for extension of the GPSS to beat any future fuel blockade.

== Operations ==
During World War II, a team of 10 men and one woman patrolled the pipeline to guard it and look for possible leaks. Each watched a section of pipeline eight to ten miles long. Later, commercial (rather than RAF) helicopters were used to patrol the pipelines on a fortnightly basis and helicopter landing pads were constructed on the depots. In the 1950s, a means of preventing pipeline corrosion known as cathodic protection became available. This applies a voltage to the pipeline such that the natural electrical action which takes place between pipe and soil leading to corrosion is reversed. Cathodic protection was applied to the pipeline system on a rolling programme which started in 1954 and was completed in 1970.

After the war the locations of the pipelines were marked with identification posts with bright yellow roofs with a thick black line. Even so, in March 2000 at Furness Vale near Whaley Bridge, High Peak, Derbyshire one of the lines was cut by workmen.

== Privatisation ==
In May 2012 the Government of the United Kingdom announced plans to sell all or part of the GPSS and legislation to enable it to do so was included in the Energy Act 2013. On 20 March 2015, the GPSS was acquired by Spanish oil network operator CLH for £82 million. The MoD also signed a contract with CLH for the military to continue to be supplied with fuel via the GPSS. It was stated that over the next ten years the MoD would pay £237 million for the use of the system. The MoD had previously paid nothing for the use of the GPSS and also gained from the surplus of income over expenditure that OPA used to generate from running the GPSS. Not having to pay operating costs and other savings were estimated to lead to net savings for the MoD of around £500 million over the 10 year period.

The sale did not include the six coastal Oil Fuel Depots owned by the MoD, which continued to be operated and maintained by the residual OPA.

Following its acquisition by CLH (later rebranded to Exolum), the GPSS was renamed in 2015 to the CLH Pipeline System, and then in 2021 to the Exolum Pipeline System.

== See also ==
- UK oil pipeline network
- Oil terminals in the United Kingdom
- Petroleum Board
