= Zodiac Clothing Company Ltd. =

Indian clothing manufacturer and retailer

Zodiac Clothing Company Ltd
- Type: Public
- Traded as: NSE: ZODIACLOTH; BSE: 521163
- ISIN: INE206B01013
- Industry: Retail
- Founded: 1984; 42 years ago
- Headquarters: Mumbai, Maharashtra, India
- Products: Clothing
- Website: www.zodiaconline.com

Zodiac Clothing Company Ltd. (ZCCL) is an Indian clothing company that manufactures men's apparel and accessories. It brands includes Zodiac, Zod! and z3 brands. The company produces men's apparel and accessories for Indian and international markets. It was started with the name of ‘House of Zodiac’ by M. Y. Noorani in 1954 as a necktie manufacturer. ZCCL was incorporated as a private limited company in 1984. It became a deemed public limited company in December 1993 and went public in January 1994.

As of 2018, Zodiac Clothing Company Ltd. has been following a company-owned model for its retail chain of 121 stores, with more than 2,100 direct on-roll employees and 1,500 independent retailers.

== Mergers and acquisitions ==
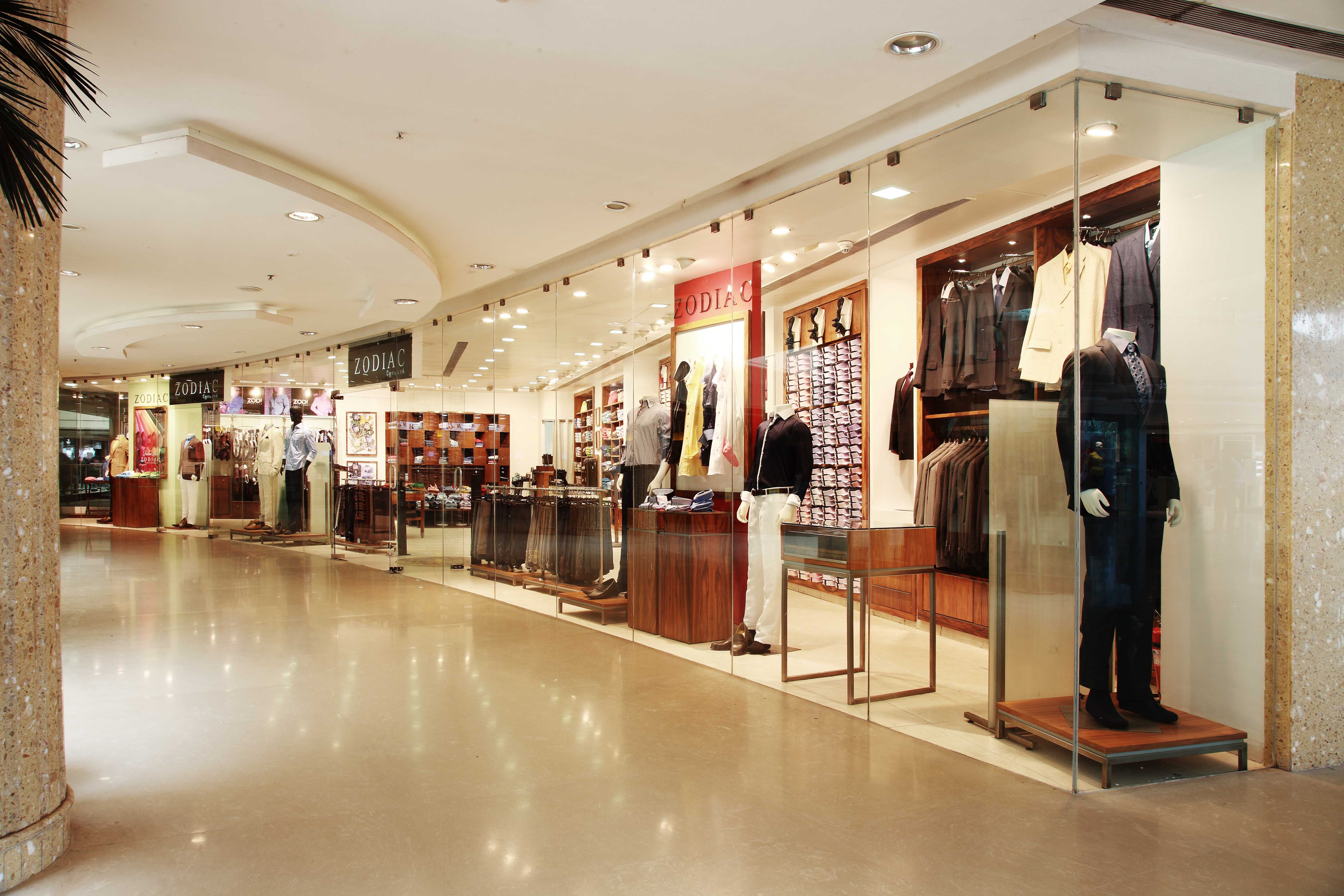
A Zodiac outlet at Express Mall, Chennai

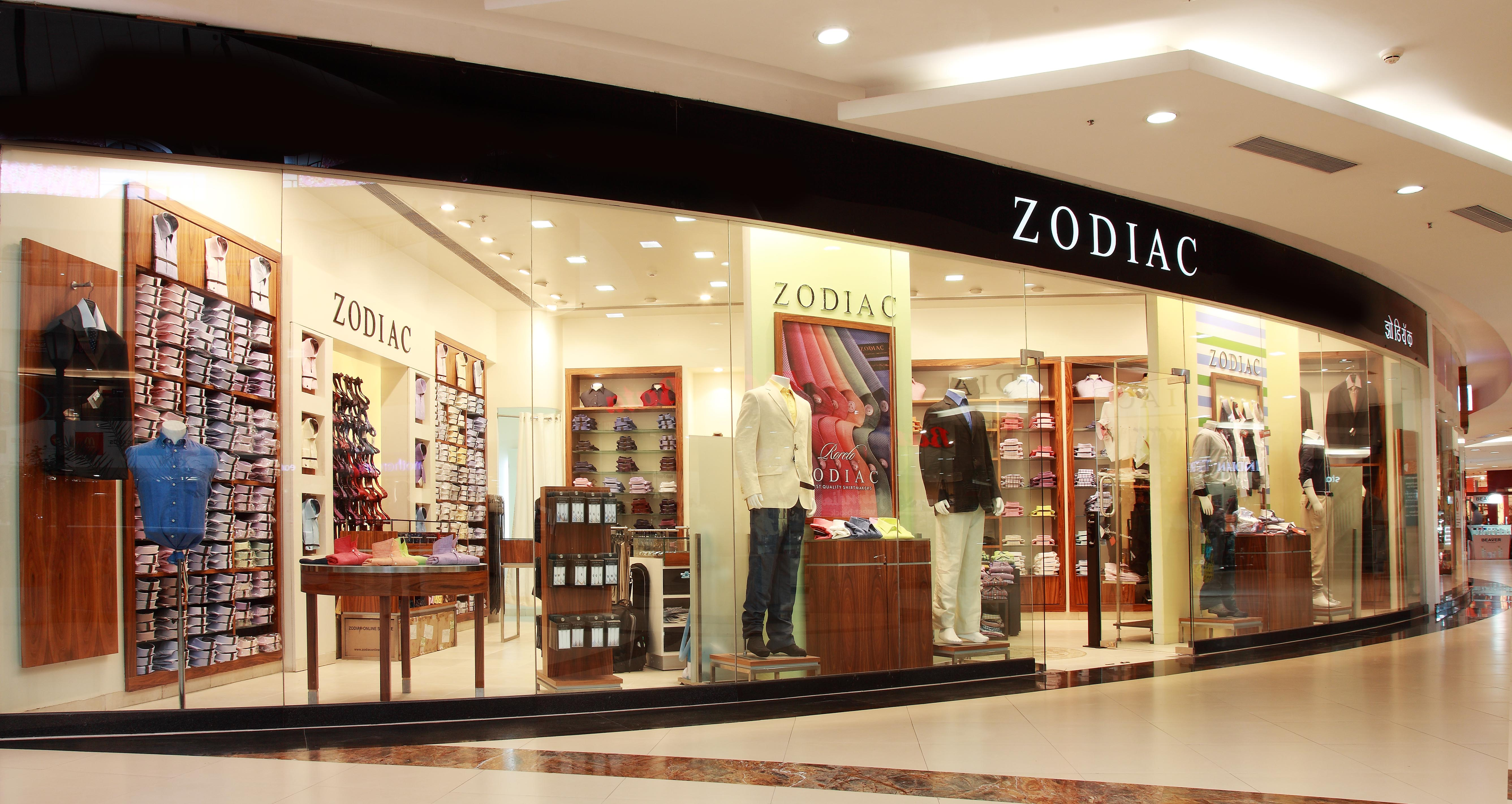
Zodiac store in Amanora Park, Pune

In 1992, Zodiac Textiles & Apparels Export Pvt. Ltd. (ZTAEPL), Multiplex Packaging Pvt. Ltd. (MPPL), and Bangalore-based Knitwear Pvt. Ltd. (BKPL) amalgamated with ZCCL. In 2004, ZCCL acquired a Dubai-based shirt manufacturing company for close to INR 25 crore.

== Marketing ==
In 1960, Ulka Kolkata, an advertising agency launched “The Zodiac Man” campaign for the marketing of ZODIAC's shirt and tie business. Dhanji Rana, the creative director of the agency, became the face of the marketing material design for the campaign. The campaign found considerable success in India, strongly placing ZODIAC in the men's formal and casual wear segments.

== Brands ==
Zodiac Clothing Company retails its products through three brands: ZODIAC (men's formal wear), and ZOD! Club Wear and z3 (relaxed casual wear).

=== ZODIAC ===
Zodiac or ZODIAC brand is ZCCL's primary market face. ZCCL markets and sells formal shirts, trousers, and ties for men. The brand's main target audience is men over the age of 35. Zodiac is among the first formal ready-to-wear brands in India.

=== ZOD! ===
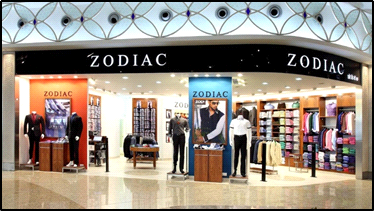
A Zodiac retail store

Launched in 2002, ZOD! primarily sells casual men's shirts and party wear targeted toward young adults. The brand's descriptive indicator was chosen as “Club Wear” targeting active party goers, as well as nightclub and disco enthusiasts.

The brand was strategically placed in the segment to narrow it down from the broader classification of “casual wear”, due to the growing popularity of nightclubs during the time. The brand was launched with the slogan, “ZOD! - Are you game?”.

=== z3 ===
Launched in 2008, z3 is ZCCL's third brand, positioned as a youth-centered, casual wear brand. z3 includes shirts, braided belts, and socks, as well as pre-washed cloths made in Egyptian cotton with a "Trademark Vintage Wash".
