= Townsend Church of England School =

Coordinates: 51°46′26″N 0°20′36″W

Location
- High Oaks; St Albans, Hertfordshire, AL3 6DR; England

Information
- Type: Faith school
- Religious affiliation: Church of England
- Established: 1933
- Founder: D. Henderson
- Department for Education URN: 117555 Tables
- Ofsted: Reports
- Chair of Governors: Ian Downs
- Head teacher: A. Flack
- Gender: Mixed
- Age: 11 to 18 (Including Sixth Form)
- Enrolment: 594
- Houses: Canterbury, Durham, Exeter, Norwich, York (current house champions)
- Website: http://www.townsend.herts.sch.uk/

Townsend Church of England School is a voluntary aided secondary school based in St Albans, Hertfordshire, England. The students attending are aged between 11 and 18 years old. The school is located to the north-west of St Albans. The surrounding areas include Harpenden (approximately 4 miles away), Wheathampstead (5 miles away), Hatfield (7 miles), Redbourn (5 miles), Watford (11 miles), Luton (10 miles), and Hemel Hempstead (7 miles).

The school is a Church of England school, the only one in the near area, and the headteacher is A. Flack, who became headteacher in 2023.

== Subjects ==
Townsend School teaches a range of subjects at Key Stage 3, GCSE and A-level. Subjects included are English, Mathematics, Science, Religious Education, History, Geography, French, Food Technology, Textiles, Physical Education, Drama, Music, Art & Design, Product Design, Computer Science, Media Studies and Business Studies.

== Sport ==
Townsend compete in many sports to varying standards. The sports that they teach and compete in are athletics, basketball, cricket, cross-country, Fitness Training, Football, Gymnastics, Netball, Orienteering, Rounders, Rugby, Softball, Swimming, Table Tennis, Tennis, Trampolining, Volleyball, Water polo.

== History ==
Dean Henderson was the founder of Townsend School, coming up with the vision in 1930. Originally, he wanted to set up two separate church schools for boys and girls and many churches in the local area got involved. With help from many of the local children, building began in 1932. The school opened in 1933. The girls' first headteacher was Miss Rollin and she was in charge of 180 girls. The Boys' School had 111 pupils with Mr. Watson as the headteacher. Both schools opened with minimum staff. The schools faced difficult times during the Second World War; a teacher had to stay in the school overnight to make sure there was no risk from fire and some lessons had to be taken in the air raid shelter that was built.

In 1965 the girls' school was moved to another site in the High Oaks area of St Albans. In 1963 Tony Flower was headteacher at the boys school until its merger in 1973, the boys took over the rest of the original site. Both schools were merged at the High Oaks site in 1973.

In September 1974, Miss Legerton, who had followed Miss Rowland as Head Teacher of the Girls' School in 1973, became head of the merged school. The official opening of the Townsend Church of England School at the High Oaks site, was performed by the Dowager Duchess of Gloucester in May 1975.

The next step for Townsend was to introduce Heathlands School for deaf children in 1979. Soon after this, Mrs. S Greenfield became headteacher; shortly after starting the school was threatened with closure in 1987. It wasn't until 1991 that the school's future seemed secure. In 2012 the Heathlands school separated from Townsend and moved to another site nearby.

In September 2015 the St Albans Music School moved into the school allowing for greater partnership with the music school and taking over the music department and part of the school previously used by the Heathlands School.

During 2018, the school continues to grow from 4 forms to 5 with the addition of the Norwich form.

== Respect for All ==
Townsend School seeks to provide a Christian education of the highest possible quality. The Respect For All policy, written by students and staff affirms the commitment to each member of the community as an individual and underpins all aspects of school life. It expresses Townsend's strong commitment to equal opportunities. Each child is valued as an individual and encouraged to take an active part in all aspects of school life. The Respect for All policy is as follows:

"At Townsend we believe that every person is equally important and that no-one has a right to harass, insult or cause offence to any other person for any reason. We particularly reject the way that some people abuse others:
because they are richer or poorer, older or younger,
because they are small or tall, thin or fat,
because of the colour of their skin,
because they are a teacher or a pupil,
because of their religion or beliefs,
because of disability or personal problems,
because of gender or sexual orientation,
because of their looks or what they wear,
because of their likes and dislikes,
because they are popular or unpopular,
because of their ability or lack of ability,
because of their nationality or accent,
We are all individuals with differences, but we are all members of Townsend and can learn from each other."

== Admissions ==
Townsend Church of England School is a Voluntary Aided School and the school governors decide who will be admitted to the school. The governors will admit 150 students to Year 7 each September. The school wishes to protect its Christian character and ethos but also warmly welcomes applications from the wider community. The places decided after those who apply for special needs or siblings places are 60% are Foundation/Faith places and 40% are community places. Distance from the school is not a criterion for admission unless there is over-subscription, when it is used as a tiebreaker.

== Location ==
The school is well-served by buses, and students travel from all parts of St Albans and surrounding towns and villages. In recent years Townsend has regularly recruited students from over 60 different primary schools and children travel to Townsend from a very wide area.
