= British Pipeline Agency =

Joint venture between BP Oil UK and Shell UK

- Type: Public limited company
- Traded as: BPA
- Industry: Oil industry
- Founded: 1969
- Founder: BP and Shell-Mex
- Headquarters: Hemel Hempstead UK
- Revenue: £56,577,635 (2024)
- Number of employees: 183

British Pipeline Agency Ltd (BPA) is a joint venture, established in 1969, between BP Oil UK and Shell UK. The company operates the UK oil pipeline network of oil pipelines which transport petroleum products around the UK.

== Operations ==
BPA replaced the pipeline operations group of Shell Mex & BP in the late 1960s and took over the role as the majority operator on the Government Pipeline and Storage System (GPSS).

As originally conceived the pipeline system comprised 1,600 miles of pipelines carrying 7.25 million tons a year of light oils, or 470 million ton miles annually.

BPA continued as the major operator of the GPSS under reimbursable and fully indemnified contracts until the 1990s when those contracts were ended and the GPSS was instead operated by a number of companies under competitively tendered term contracts.

== The company ==
The BPA board comprises five directors, although the articles of association allows for up to ten. One director acts as the chairman and one is the general manager. There is also a company secretary. The registered office is 5-7 Alexandra Road, Hemel Hempstead, Hertfordshire, HP2 5BS.

In 2024 the company made a pre-tax profit of £2,532,760.

BPA has nearly 200 staff.

== See also ==
- UK Oil Pipeline Network
- Oil and Pipelines Agency
