= Oil terminal =

Industrial facility for the storage of oil, petroleum and petrochemical products

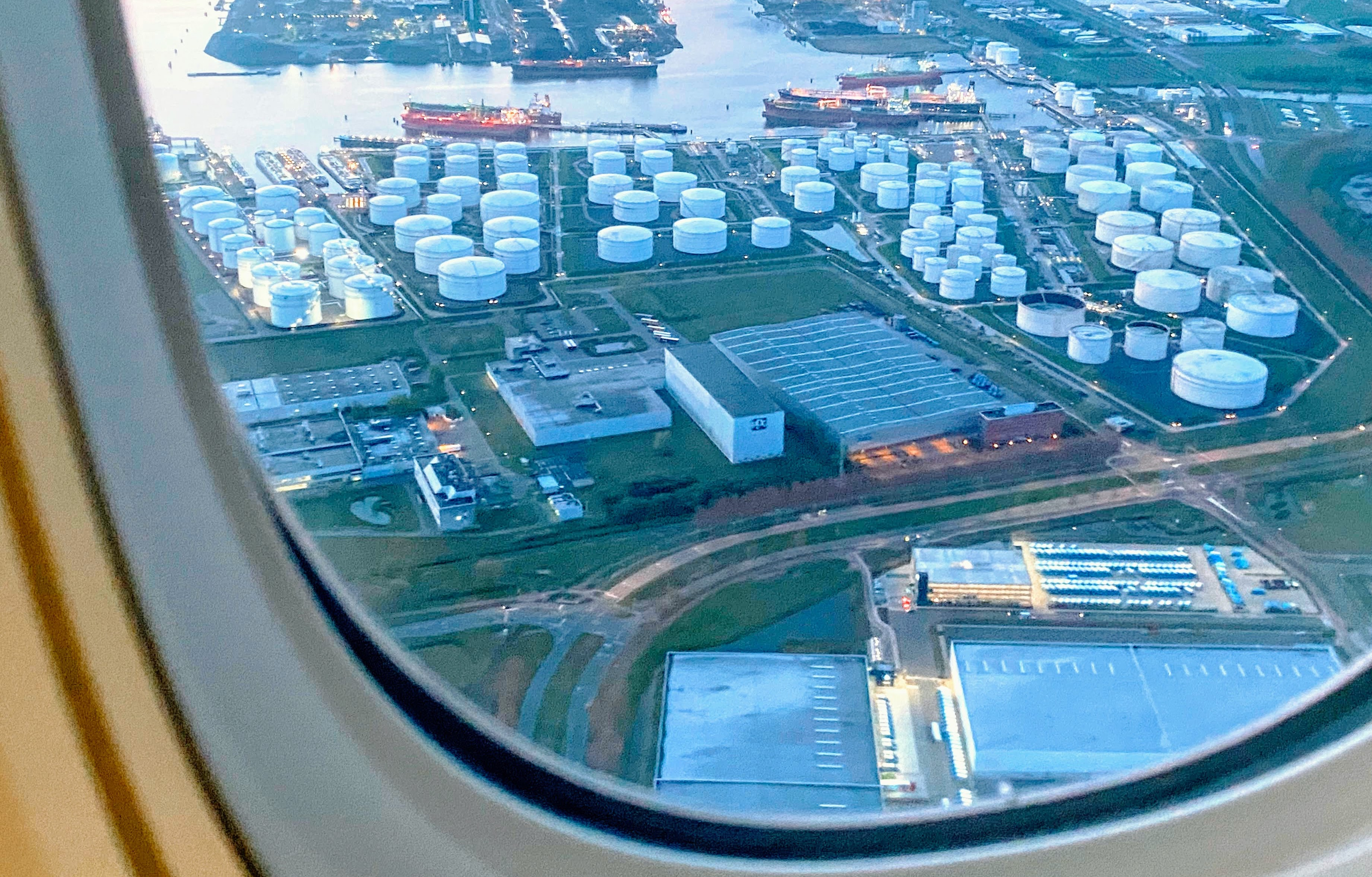
Evos Amsterdam Oost Terminal, as seen from an airplane. It facilitates storage and blending of gasoline, oil, and bio fuels.

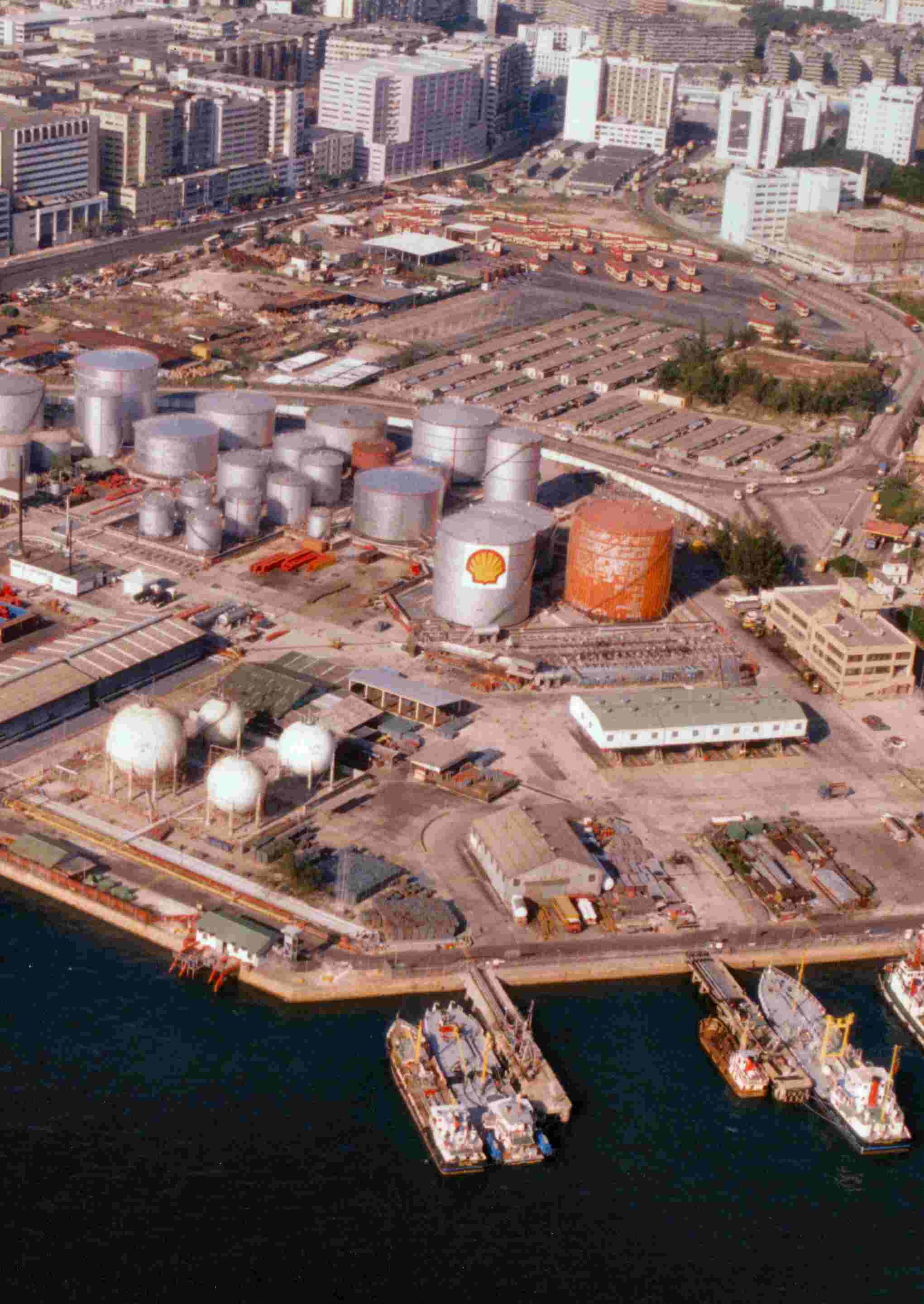
An oil depot in Kowloon, Hong Kong around the mid-1980s. The depot was redeveloped into a residential area Laguna City in the late 80s and early 90s.

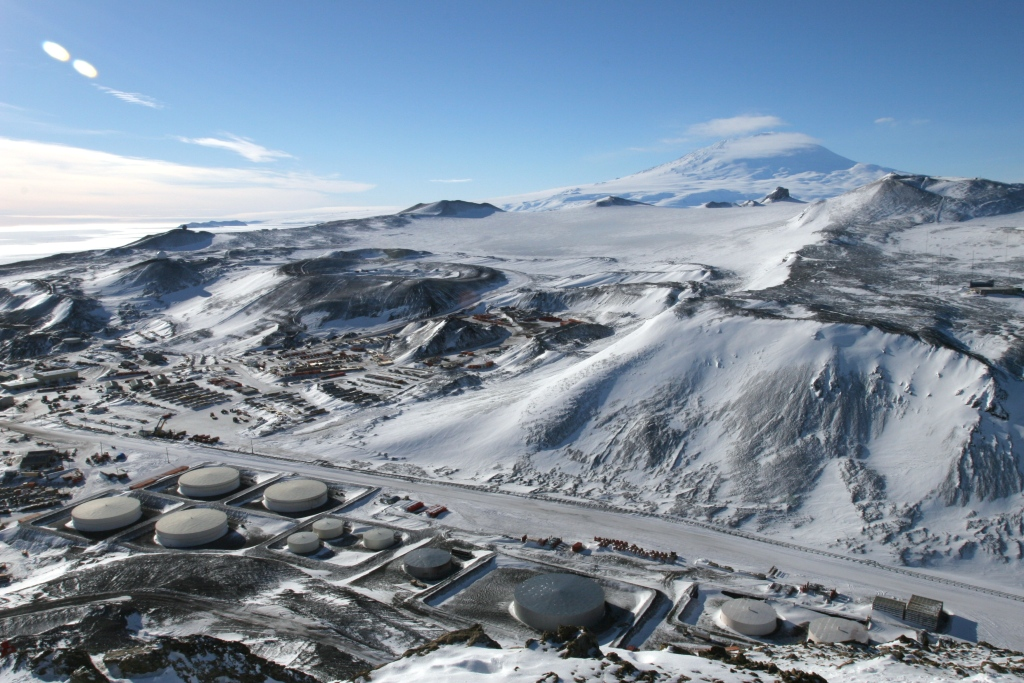
Tank farm at McMurdo Station, Antarctica

An oil terminal (also called a tank farm, tankfarm, oil installation or oil depot) is an industrial facility for the storage of oil, petroleum and petrochemical products, and from which these products are transported to end users or other storage facilities. An oil terminal typically has a variety of above or below ground tankage; facilities for inter-tank transfer; pumping facilities; loading gantries for filling road tankers or barges; ship loading/unloading equipment at marine terminals; and pipeline connections.

== History ==
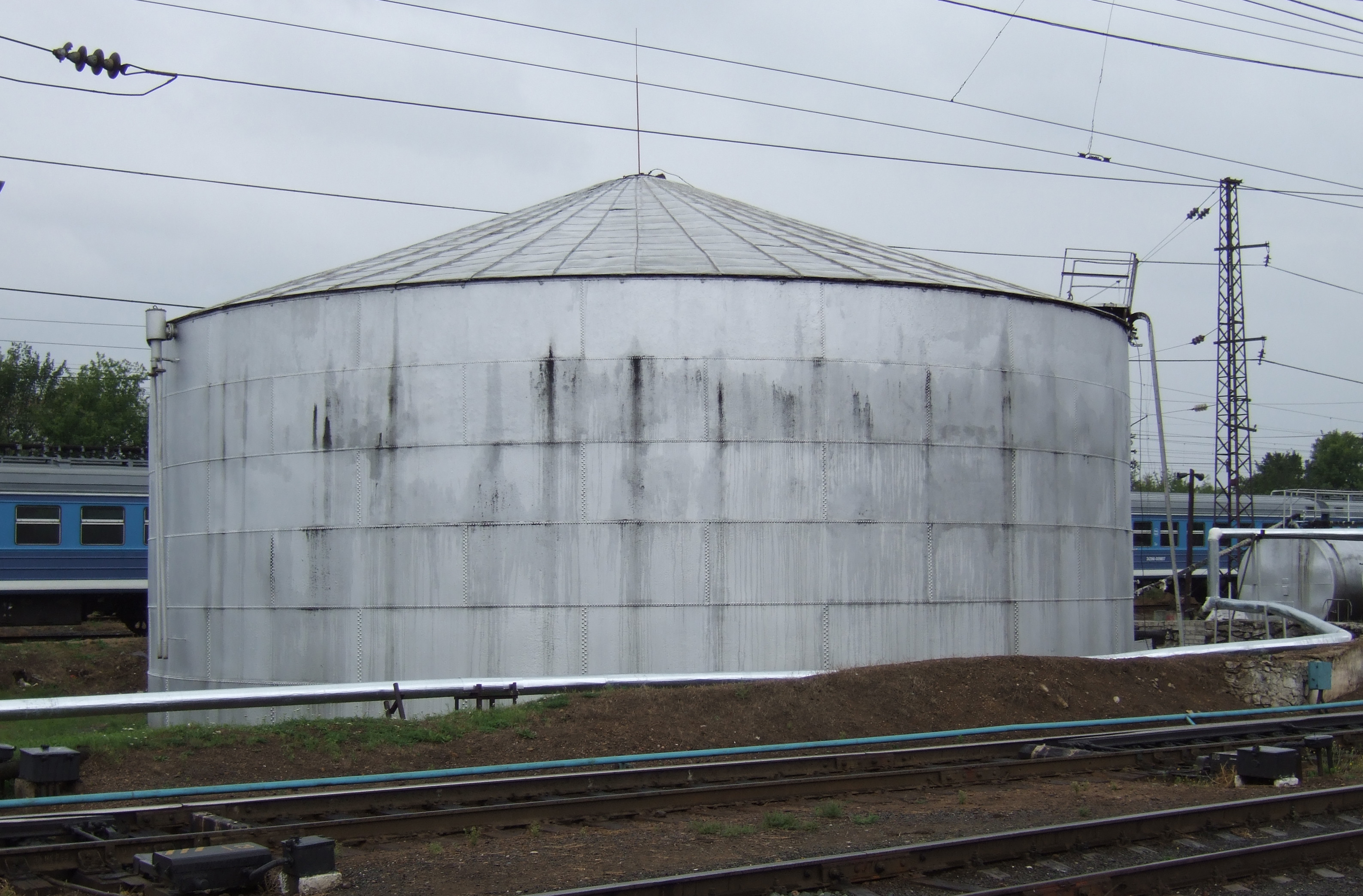
Historical oil tank using steel rivets to attach wall metal plates

Originally, open pits and cubic reservoirs were used for industrial oil storage.

The vertical cylindrical steel reservoir structure was pioneered by Russian engineer Vladimir Shukhov during his work for Branobel oil company. He published an article "Mechanical structures in oil industry" ("Механические сооружения нефтяной промышленности") in 1883, mathematically proving that cylindrical shape would require the least steel, modelling structural stresses specific to oil storage. Shukhov also developed construction methods, including tables that allowed to calculate required amount of steel and components depending on the reservoir size and type. By 1890, 130 vertical cylindrical reservoirs using Shukhov design were built in Russia.

== Location ==
Oil terminals may be located close to, or be part of, oil refineries; or be located in coastal locations where marine tankers can discharge or load cargo. Some terminals are connected to pipelines from which they draw or discharge their products. Terminals can also be served by rail, barge and road tanker (sometimes known as "bridging"). Oil terminals are also located near cities from which road tankers transport products to petrol stations or other domestic, commercial or industrial users.

== Facilities ==
In many oil terminals there are no facilities for processing or other product transformation on site. The products from a refinery which are stored in the terminal are in their final form suitable for delivery to customers. Blending of products may be undertaken, and additives may be injected into products, but there is usually no manufacturing plant on site. Modern terminals have a high degree of site automation.

Marine oil terminals have jetties to provide a deep water mooring for tankers. Jetties have loading/unloading arms for transferring cargo to/from ship to shore. Facilities for vapor recovery may be provided.

=== Crude oil terminals ===
Some oil terminals receive crude oil production from offshore installations. Crude oil received by pipeline may have been 'spiked' with natural gas liquids (NGL), and is known as live crude. Such oil needs to be processed or stabilised to remove the lighter fractions such as ethane, propane and butane to produce a dead or stabilised crude that is suitable for storage and transport. Such oil terminals may include processing facilities to treat the oil to achieve an oil Reid vapor pressure (RVP) of 10 to 12 psi (70 to 82 kPa). The process facilities include oil heaters to warm the oil which then routed to separator vessels. In the separators, the lighter fractions flash off from the oil and are further processed to separate them into their individual components. The now stabilised oil can be routed to storage and then sold or sent for further processing.

=== Airports ===
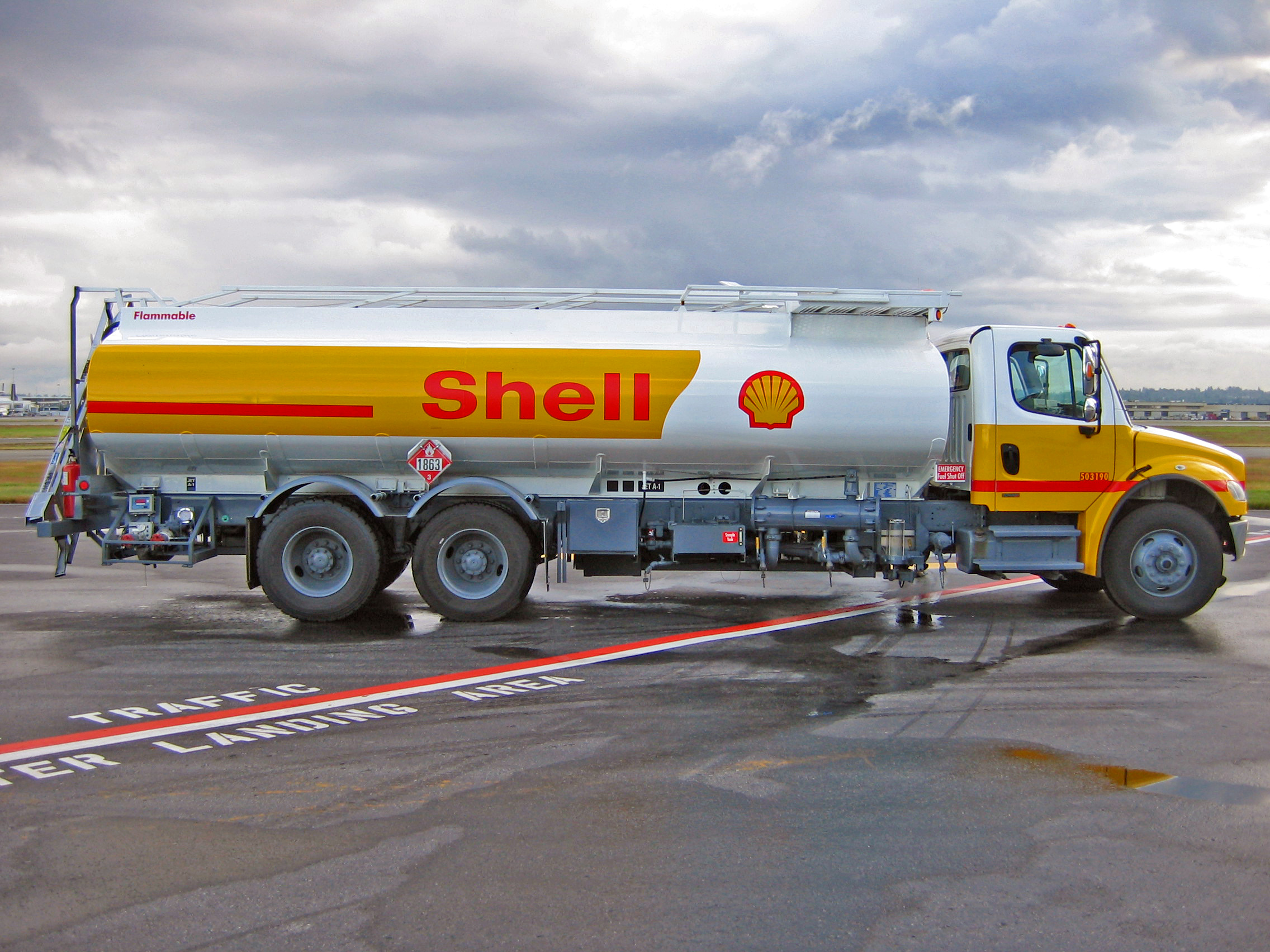
Aircraft refueller at Vancouver airport

Most airports also have their own dedicated oil depots (usually called "fuel farms") where aviation fuel (Jet A or 100LL) is stored prior to being discharged into aircraft fuel tanks. Fuel is transported from the depot to the aircraft either by road tanker or via a hydrant system.

=== Tanks ===
The storage tanks at an oil terminal may include fixed roof tanks, internal floating roof tanks and external floating roof tanks. Floating roof tanks are generally used for more volatile products to reduce evaporation loss. Fixed roof tanks have a vapor space above the product, which breathes in or out as the product is removed or the tank is filled. Some tanks may be fitted with internal heating coils using hot water or steam to keep the contents warm. This reduces the viscosity of the product to ease transfer and pumping. Terminals may also have Horton spheres which are used to store liquefied petroleum gases such as propane and butane (see left foreground of the above Kowloon oil depot).

== Standards ==
The design, construction, operation and maintenance of an oil terminal must be in accordance with local, national, regional and international codes, standards, and legal and statutory requirements. Relevant standards include:

- Safety Guidelines and Good Industry Practices for Oil Terminals, United Nations Economic Commission for Europe (ECE), 2013.
- Environmental, Health, and Safety Guidelines for Crude Oil and Petroleum Product Terminals, World Bank Group (April 2007).
- Design, Construction, Operation, Maintenance, and Inspection of Terminal and Tank Facilities, American Petroleum Institute, API STD 2610.
- Guidance for Oil Terminal Operators, International Maritime Organization (IMO) International Ship and Port Facility Security (ISPS) Code (2003).
- Tank Farm Guidelines for the Chemical Industry, Basle Chemical Industry (BCI, 2009).
- OECD Guidance Concerning Chemical Safety in Port Areas (OCDE/GD(96)39), Organisation for Economic Co-operation and Development (OECD, 1996).
- Design Code for Aboveground Atmospheric Storage Tanks, American Petroleum Institute, API 650.
- Overfill Protection for Storage Tanks in Petroleum Facilities, American Petroleum Institute, API Recommended Practice 2350, 4th edition.
- Prevention Of Tank Bottom Leakage - A Guide For The Design And Repair Of Foundations And Bottoms Of Vertical, Cylindrical, Steel Storage Tanks, EEMUA 183:2011, Engineering Equipment and Materials Users' Association (EEMUA, 2011).
- Tank Inspection, Repair, Alteration, and Reconstruction, American Petroleum Institute, API standard 653, 4th edition, April 2009.
- Functional safety - Safety instrumented systems for the process industry sector, International Society of Automation (September 2004).
- Process Safety Management of Highly Hazardous Chemicals standard, 29 CFR 1910.119, Occupational Safety and Health Administration (OSHA, February 1992).
- Safety Guidelines and Good Practices for Pipelines, ECE/CP.TEIA/2006/11, United Nations Economic Commission for Europe (December 2008).

== Health, safety and environment ==
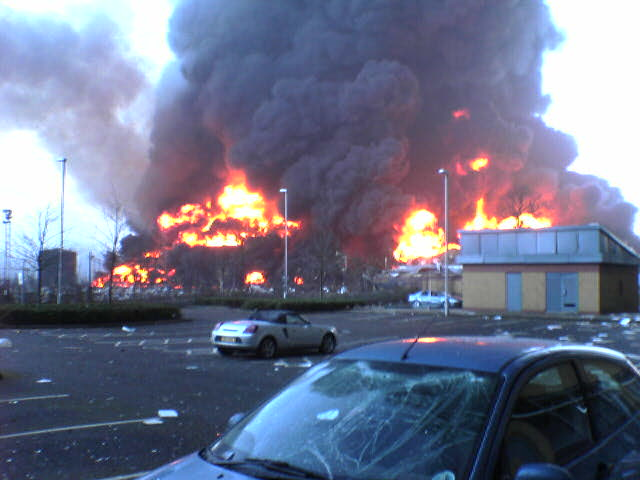
Massive fire at Buncefield Oil Depot, UK December 2005

Maintaining health, safety and environment (HSE) requires operators of a depot to ensure that products are safely stored and handled. There must be no leakages (etc.) which could damage the soil or the water table.

Fire protection is a primary consideration, especially for the more flammable products such as petrol (gasoline) and Jet A1 aviation fuel.

=== Incidents ===
A tank farm fire in Proletarsk, Rostov Oblast was detected by NASA's FIRMS from 18 to 30 August 2024

The Buncefield incident occurred in December 2005. A petrol tank overflowed and spilt petrol down the outside of the tank which created a flammable fuel air mixture. This exploded and damaged and set fire to adjoining tanks and burnt for several days destroying much of the terminal.

On 18 August 2024, during the Russian invasion of Ukraine, a tank farm in Proletarsk, Rostov Oblast, Russia was set ablaze by a Ukrainian Armed Forces drone strike and burned until the fire was extinguished on 2 September.

== Ownership ==
The ownership of oil depots falls into three main categories:

- Single oil company ownership. When one company owns and operates a depot on its own behalf.
- Joint or consortium ownership, where two or more companies own a depot together and share its operating costs.
- Independent ownership, where a depot is owned not by an oil company but by a separate business which charges oil companies (and others) a fee to store and handle products. The Royal Vopak from the Netherlands is the largest independent terminal operator with 80 terminals in 30 countries.

The owners may also provide "hospitality" or "pick up rights" at the facility to other companies.

== See also ==
- Oil production plant
- Oil-storage trade
- Onshore (hydrocarbon)
- Oil terminals in India
- Oil terminals in the United Kingdom
- Oil terminals in Ireland
