= AP 42 Compilation of Air Pollutant Emission Factors =

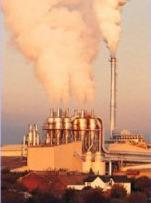
An air pollution source

The AP 42 Compilation of Air Pollutant Emission Factors is a compilation of the US Environmental Protection Agency (EPA)'s emission factor information on air pollution, first published in 1968. As of 2018, the last edition is the 5th from 2010.

== History ==
The AP 42 Compilation of Air Pollutant Emission Factors is a compilation of emission factors of air pollutants, in other words numbers which relate the quantity of a pollutant released into the ambient air with a certain activity. This compilation was first compiled and published by the US Public Health Service in 1968. In 1972, it was revised and issued as the second edition by the US Environmental Protection Agency EPA. In 1985, the subsequent fourth edition was split into two volumes: Volume I has since included stationary point and area source emission factors, and Volume II includes mobile source emission factors. Volume I is currently in its fifth edition and is available on the Internet. Volume II is no longer maintained as such, but roadway air dispersion models for estimating emissions from on-road vehicles and from non-road vehicles and mobile equipment are available on the Internet.

In routine common usage, Volume I of the emission factor compilation is very often referred to as simply AP 42.

== Content ==
Air pollution emission factors are usually expressed as the weight of the pollutant divided by a unit weight, volume, distance, or duration of the activity emitting the pollutant (e.g., kilograms of particulate matter emitted per megagram of coal burned). The factors help to estimate emissions from various sources of air pollution. In most cases, the factors are simply averages of all available data of acceptable quality, and are generally assumed to be representative of long-term averages.

The equation for the estimation of emissions before emission reduction controls are applied is:

E = A × EF

and for emissions after reduction controls are applied:

E = A × EF × (1-ER/100)

where:
E	= emissions, in units of pollutant per unit of time
A	= activity rate, in units of weight, volume, distance, or duration per unit of time
EF	= emission factor, in units of pollutant per unit of weight, volume, distance, or duration
ER	= overall emission reduction efficiency, in %

Emission factors are used by atmospheric dispersion modelers and others to determine the amount of air pollutants being emitted from sources within industrial facilities.

== Chapters ==
Chapter 1	External Combustion Sources
Chapter 2	Solid Waste Disposal
Chapter 3	Stationary Internal Combustion Sources
Chapter 4	Evaporation Loss Sources
Chapter 5	Petroleum Industry
Chapter 6	Organic Chemical Process Industry
Chapter 7	Liquid Storage Tanks
Chapter 8	Inorganic Chemical Industry
Chapter 9	Food and Agricultural Industries
Chapter 10	Wood Products Industry
Chapter 11	Mineral Products Industry
Chapter 12	Metallurgical Industry
Chapter 13	Miscellaneous Sources
Chapter 14	Greenhouse Gas Biogenic Sources
Chapter 15	Ordnance Detonation
Appendix A	Miscellaneous Data & Conversion Factors
Appendix B.1	Particle Size Distribution Data and Sized Emission Factors for Selected Sources
Appendix B.2	Generalized Particle Size Distributions
Appendix C.1	Procedures for Sampling Surface/Bulk Dust Loading
Appendix C.2	Procedures for Laboratory Analysis of Surface/Bulk Dust Loading Samples

Chapter 5, Section 5.1 "Petroleum Refining" discusses the air pollutant emissions from the equipment in the various refinery processing units as well as from the auxiliary steam-generating boilers, furnaces and engines, and Table 5.1.1 includes the pertinent emission factors. Table 5.1.2 includes the emission factors for the fugitive air pollutant emissions from the large wet cooling towers in refineries and from the oil/water separators used in treating refinery wastewater.

The fugitive air pollutant emission factors from relief valves, piping valves, open-ended piping lines or drains, piping flanges, sample connections, and seals on pump and compressor shafts are discussed and included in the report EPA-458/R-95-017, "Protocol for Equipment Leak Emission Estimates" which is included in the Chapter 5 section of AP 42. That report includes the emission factors developed by the EPA for petroleum refineries and for the synthetic organic chemical industry (SOCMI).

In most cases, the emission factors in Chapter 5 are included for both uncontrolled conditions before emission reduction controls are implemented and controlled conditions after specified emission reduction methods are implemented.

Chapter 7 "Liquid Storage Tanks" is devoted to the methodology for calculating the emissions losses from the six basic tank designs used for organic liquid storage: fixed roof (vertical and horizontal), external floating roof, domed external (or covered) floating roof, internal floating roof, variable vapor space, and pressure (low and high). The methodology in Chapter 7 was developed by the American Petroleum Institute in collaboration with the EPA.

The EPA has developed a software program named "TANKS" which performs the Chapter 7 methodology for calculating emission losses from storage tanks. The program's installer file along with a user manual, and the source code are available on the Internet.

Chapters 5 and 7 discussed above are illustrative of the type of information contained in the other chapters of AP 42. Many of the fugitive emission factors in Chapter 5 and the emissions calculation methodology in Chapter 7 and the TANKS program also apply to many other industrial categories besides the petroleum industry.

== See also ==
- Cement kiln emissions
- Emission factor
