= Occidental Refinery =

Oil refinery in Essex, England

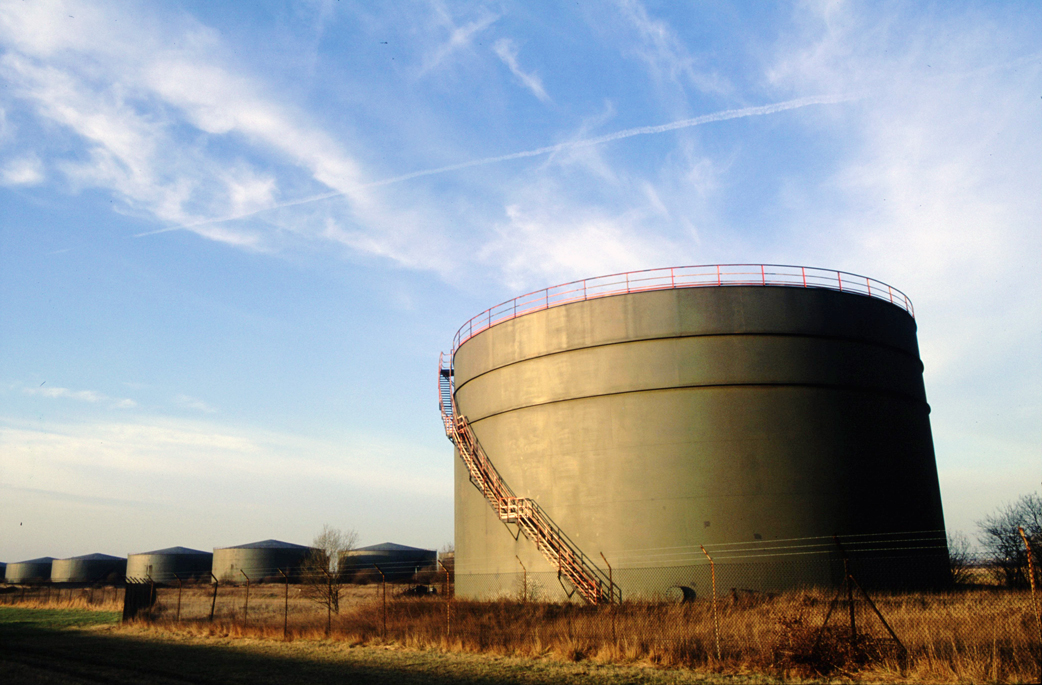
Disused storage tanks at the Occidental site, 1997

The Occidental Refinery (or Occidental Thames Refinery) was a planned oil refinery on Canvey Island, Essex, England. Located in the Thames Estuary, the partly-built, non-operational, six million tonne/year refinery was planned and constructed by Occidental Refineries Limited in 1970–5 and demolished in 1996–7.

== History ==
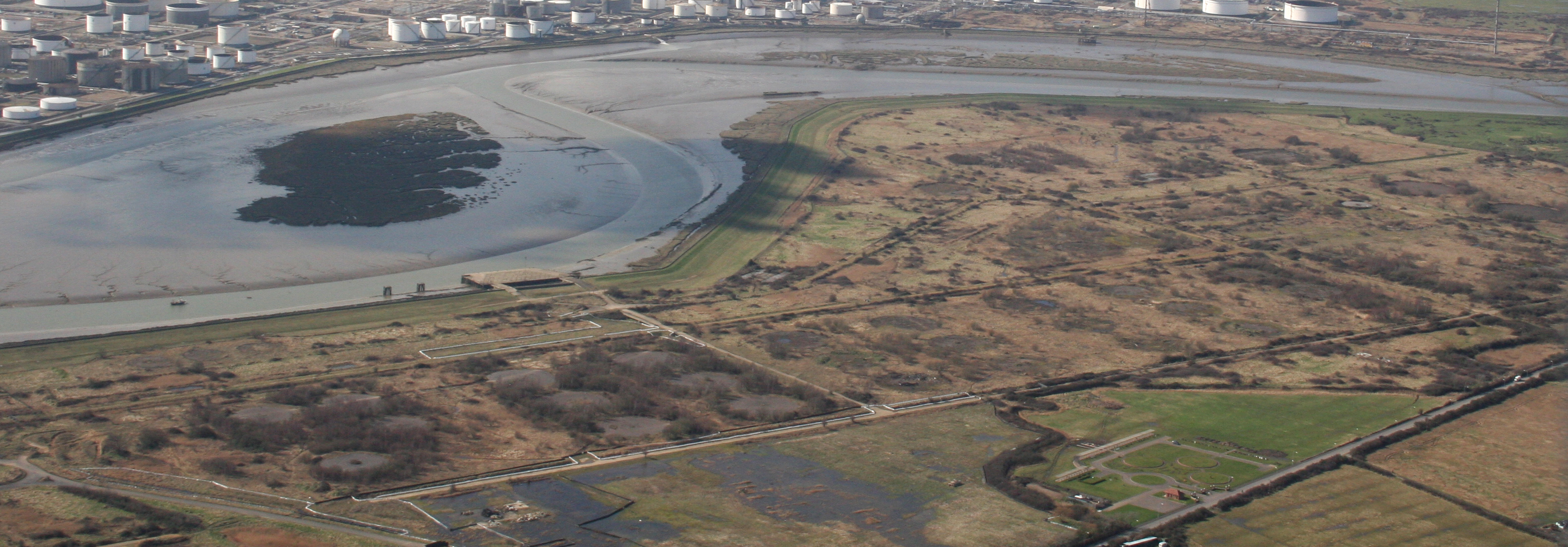
The refinery site in 2009

In 1970 Occidental Refineries Limited, a subsidiary of the American Occidental Petroleum Corporation, applied to build an oil refinery on a 323-acre (130 ha) marshland site on Canvey Island south of Northwick Road for the production of heavy fuel oils. Planning permission was refused by the local planning authorities, Occidental appealed against the refusal so the Department of the Environment held a public inquiry in November 1970 to determine the case. Occidental Refineries Limited was initially in partnership with United Refineries Limited although the latter withdrew from the project just prior to the inquiry. At the public inquiry objections were raised by opponents of the development about air and water pollution; the impact on health; the loss of amenity; the risks of fire and explosion; and problems of traffic congestion. Nevertheless, the inquiry inspector recommended approval, which was endorsed by the Secretary of State for the Environment Peter Walker in November 1971.

== Oil processing ==
Crude oil was to be delivered to the refinery from ocean-going vessels of up to 100,000 dwt (deadweight tons) via a mile long jetty extending into the deep water of the river Thames from Hole Haven creek. Crude oil storage capacity at the refinery was 3.75 million barrels in ten floating roof tanks (220 ft in diameter and 56 ft high) together with 160,000 barrels of ship ballast water storage.

The treatment and refining processes at the Occidental refinery were:

- Crude oil desalting
- Primary distillation
- Product desulphurisation
- Fixed bed catalytic reforming
- Liquefied Petroleum Gas (LPG) distillation
- Hydrogen sulphide extraction
- Sulphur production
- Sour water stripping
- Oily water separation (gravity separation)

Refinery products were to include those shown in the table below.

Occidental refinery products, storage facilities and exports
Product	Site storage	Total storage capacity (barrels)	Number and dimension of tanks	Export route
Propane	Horton spheres	21,490	Ten, 30 ft diameter	Road
Butane	Cylindrical 'bullet' vessels	52,910	Three, 15 ft x 60 ft	Road
Petrol (98, 99 and 101 Research Octane Number)	Floating roof tanks	180,000	Six, 70 ft x 48 ft	Road, ship, pipeline
Kerosene	Floating roof tanks	60,000	Two, 70 ft x 48 ft	Road, ship, pipeline
Jet fuel	Floating roof tanks	200,000	Two, 180 ft x 54 ft	Road, ship, pipeline
Diesel oil	Fixed roof tanks	60,000	Two, 70 ft x 48 ft	Road, ship
Fuel oil	Fixed roof tanks	1,800,000	Four, 220 ft x 48 ft; Four, 140 ft x 54 ft	Road, ship
Sulphur	Cylindrical 'bullet' vessels			Road

In addition to the above tanks, there were storage tanks for a range of intermediate products (reformate, naphtha, gas oil, etc.), and recovered oil and oily slops. There was to be about 70 tanks on the refinery site. The original design for the refinery included a rail loading facility for the export of some petroleum products. In 1972 British Railways obtained legal powers to build a railway branch line from the main London, Tilbury and Southend line onto Canvey Island to provide loading facilities for the Occidental and other refineries (see below) being planned on the island.

== Construction and redesign ==
Occidental started construction of the refinery in 1972. It built about twenty oil and product storage tanks, a 137-metre high concrete chimney for the furnaces and a deep-water jetty. In addition, 10,000 tonnes of refinery plant, such as distillation columns, were brought to the site and positioned ready for assembly. Construction work stopped in 1975 when, having invested £55 million, economic studies demonstrated that the proposed refinery was unlikely to be profitable. This was a consequence of the Middle East oil crisis of 1973-4 when the price of oil increased from $2 to $11 per barrel between 1970 and January 1974, and the consequent slump in demand for petroleum products. The project went into abeyance and no further work was undertaken on the refinery site.

Meanwhile, local residents formed the Refinery Resistance Group which campaigned to stop hazardous industrial developments. The local Member of Parliament Bernard Braine spoke in Parliament in 1974 about the dangers of the agglomeration of hazardous industry on Canvey.

In May 1977 Occidental Refineries Ltd applied to adapt the refinery to produce high-octane fuels with a reduction in the production of heavy fuel oil. The modified process plant included a hydrogen fluoride alkylation unit. Castle Point District Council refused planning consent in November 1977 on the basis that the Health and Safety Executive (HSE) were undertaking an analysis of the overall industrial hazardous risks on Canvey. The HSE identified the hazardous inventory on the proposed refinery site to be the storage of more than 125,000 m^{3} of hydrocarbon liquids; 2,300 tonnes of liquefied petroleum gases (LPG); and 10-20 tonnes of hydrogen fluoride. In August 1978 Occidental announced it was not proceeding with this development, partly because of the increased costs associated with HSE's report; the project again went into abeyance.

In 1980 the Occidental Petroleum Corporation revised its plans and proposed to build a 60,000 barrel (9,539m^{3})/day residue-upgrading refinery on the site. This aimed to 'satisfy the requirements of the planning and safety authorities as well as our own economic criteria'. But this proposal too was not developed, a consequence of the Iranian revolution when the oil price increased from $13 to $34 per barrel between 1979 and 1981. No further work was undertaken by Occidental on the Canvey site.

== Demolition and legacy ==
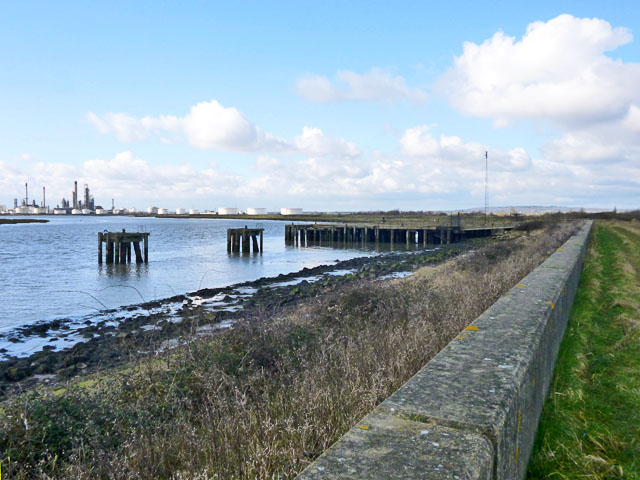
The site's jetty, in 2015

In 1993, CMN Enterprises of China purchased the unused refinery process plant and had it shipped via Tilbury Docks to Ko Fung Oil Refinery in Hainan China. The unused tanks and the chimney on the Occidental site were demolished in 1996–7, only the concrete foundations of the tanks and the jetty remain. Despite the expenditure of £55 million (1975 prices) no oil or petroleum was ever stored or processed at the Occidental Canvey Refinery. Part of the refinery site is now Canvey Wick nature reserve designated a Site of Special Scientific Interest (SSSI) in 2005.

== Other Canvey Island refineries ==
In addition to the partly-built Occidental refinery several other refineries were proposed for Canvey Island. However, none proved to be economically viable and were not developed beyond the design and planning stage. The proposed developments included the following.

Planned, unbuilt oil refineries on Canvey Island
Company	Refinery capacity (million tonnes/year)	Site (ha)	Date	Planning permission
AGIP	2	94	1964–5	Yes
URL/Murco	4	219	1970–1	No, refused
URL	4	127	1972–3	Yes
URL/ORL	10		1973–4	Joint refinery project, abandoned

=== AGIP refinery ===
In 1964 the Italian oil company AGIP (Azienda Generale Italiana Petroli), a subsidiary of the Italian state-owned Eni (Ente Nazionale Idrocarburi) S.p.A., was granted an Industrial Development Certificate (IDC) by the UK Board of Trade to build an oil refinery on a 94 ha site in the north-west of Canvey (51.5367°N 0.5500°E). The IDC was introduced in 1947 as a means of influencing the pattern of industrial location throughout Britain and was required before seeking planning permission. In granting this Industrial Development Certificate in a rural area the Board of Trade implicitly identified Canvey as an appropriate site for industrial development. Over 20,000 local people signed a petition opposing the development; the principal concern was air pollution and fumes from the refinery.

AGIP formally applied for planning permission for a two million tonne/year refinery, but were refused by the planning committee of Essex County Council in December 1964. AGIP appealed against the decision and the Ministry of Housing and Local Government held a public inquiry between 25 May – 3 June 1965. The local Member of Parliament, Bernard Braine, raised the issue of the refinery in the House of Commons. He noted that residents 'would be exposed for short periods to high concentrations of sulphur dioxide’ and 'the additional nuisance of the oily smell which arises from the mercaptan products of refinery operations'. Braine had previously raised the issue of air pollution from the Thameside refineries firstly in 1953 during a Commons debate and in 1958 had presented the Minister of Housing and Local Government with a petition signed by 6,000 Canvey residents protesting about atmospheric pollution from the Thameside refineries (Shell Haven and Coryton). In 1965 United Refineries Limited (URL), another Eni subsidiary, took forward the refinery development on Canvey.

Following the 1965 public inquiry the Ministry inspector upheld the planning refusal on the grounds that the refinery would 'seriously diminish the value of the green wedge separating the Thameside industrial belt from residential areas between Basildon and Southend’. In addition there were concerns about air pollution, the size of the plant, the height of the chimneys, and road congestion. The Labour Minister of Housing and Local Government, Richard Crossman, was sympathetic to the views of Canvey residents. However, senior civil servants in the Ministry, the Permanent Secretary Dame Evelyn Sharp and the Deputy Secretary Sir James Jones insisted Crossman should over-rule the inspector in the national interest. At a Home Affairs Committee meeting on 29 October 1965 together with the Foreign Office, the Commonwealth Office, the Ministry of Power, the Department of Economic Affairs and the Treasury 'all insisted that we couldn't afford to upset a foreign oil company'. Crossman succeeded in delaying the decision as it was revealed that AGIP wanted to sell their British interests to Esso on the ground that 'there wasn't enough market in the UK for them to worry about'. Crossman eventually overturned his Inspector's decision and granted consent for the £15 million refinery; he ruled that national economic interest should override local interests.

The approval was conditional: the siting, design, external appearance and landscaping of the refinery had to be agreed with the local planning authority, and construction had to start by 1 January 1969; there was to be a single chimney; and there was to be no plant for catalytic cracking, blowing of bitumen or vacuum distillation without further planning permission. The Financial Times noted that the refinery would save £4–6 million a year in import costs. However, no construction work was undertaken, Braine suggested that a refinery of this size – two million tonnes/year – would not be economic. Also Eni underwent a period of retrenchment following the death of its 'exuberant chairman' Enrico Mattei in 1962. Eni only took an interest in building a refinery again in 1969 in partnership with Murco.

=== United Refineries Limited refinery ===
1969/70 application

On 12 November 1969 United Refineries Limited United Refineries Limited (URL), a subsidiary of the Italian state-owned Eni, and in a joint venture (50%/50%) with Murco, itself a subsidiary of the American Murphy Oil Corporation, applied to the Department of Trade and Industry for an Industrial Development Certificate for refinery on Canvey Island. An IDC was granted on 18 February 1970. In late 1970 URL applied for planning permission to build a four million tonnes/year oil refinery on Canvey Island. This was to be constructed on an extended 541 acre (219 ha) site based around AGIP's 1965 refinery site (51.5367°N 0.5500°E). Bernard Braine claimed that Murco had joined the venture because they had been refused permission to build a refinery in Glasgow, Scotland. Canvey Island Urban District Council and Essex County Council opposed the application and a public inquiry was held in March – April 1971. The Department of the Environment (DoE) inspector, K.M. Sargeant MA FRICS, concluded that permitting the refinery would be a 'serious environmental mistake', but also said that a similar proposal would not necessarily be ruled out if a site could be found to which there were not 'such strong amenity objections'. The inspector recommended refusal of the application.

Meanwhile, Occidental Refineries Limited, initially in partnership with URL, had applied for permission to build a six million tonnes/year oil refinery on a 325-acre (131 ha) site in the south east of Canvey (see Occidental refinery above). A public inquiry was held in November 1970, at which the DoE inspector, again K.M. Sargeant, recommended approval of the application. Having considered the inspector's recommendations from the two inquiries the Secretary of State, Peter Walker, granted permission for the Occidental refinery on 23 November 1971 but refused the URL application because of the effect the development would have on the local environment, specifically the need to leave an area of open land between the Occidental refinery and South Benfleet.

1972 application

On 21 December 1971 URL reapplied to the Department of Trade and Industry for an IDC for a refinery on a new site. Having been granted an IDC, in 1972 URL applied for permission to build a four million tonnes/year oil refinery on a 314-acre (127 ha) site south of the AGIP site and north of the ORL site. The DoE inspector, again K.M. Sargeant, said there were no insuperable objections to the application on pollution or navigational grounds, and that highway objections could be resolved locally. He also noted that the re-positioning of the refinery's prominent structures (process plant, chimneys, flare stack, etc.) to the western part of the site was an improvement. Nevertheless, he argued that no further development should be permitted north of Northwick Road. He concluded that there was not enough land left on Canvey for another refinery and recommended the application should be rejected. The Secretary of State for the Environment, Geoffrey Rippon, considered that local amenity objection were not strong enough to outweigh economic advantages of the refinery. Rippon granted permission for the URL refinery on 28 March 1973; one condition prohibited URL from implementing both the 1965 and the 1973 approvals.

The features of the 1970 and 1972 refinery proposals include:

- Annual capacity: 4 million tonnes
- Total tankage capacity: 40 million cubic feet
- Jetty facilities: one mooring for 130,000 dwt; one mooring for 18,000 dwt; one mooring for coastal/river traffic
- Quantities of products to be shipped:
  - Road: 70,000 tonnes/year
  - Rail: 616,000 tonnes/year
  - Pipeline to Midlands: 578,000 tonnes/year
  - Ship: 1,883,000 tonnes/year

=== URL/ORL 1973–4 joint refinery ===
In 1973–4 URL and ORL entered discussions about building a single joint refinery with a capacity of ten million tonnes/year. This was to be built mainly on the Occidental site. By September 1974 it appeared that agreement between the companies was unlikely to be reached.

=== Reappraisal of hazards and risks ===
In 1974 the new Labour Secretary of State for the Environment, Anthony Crosland, announced an exploratory inquiry into revoking the planning permission for the URL refinery. The inquiry was held in February – March 1975 under the chairmanship of W.G. Onslow CB; it concluded that the totality of risk from hazardous industries on Canvey should be assessed. Crosland instructed the Health and Safety Executive (HSE) to undertake an assessment of the risks on Canvey. The HSE reported in June 1978. The hazardous inventory at the URL refinery was more than 125,000 m^{3} of hydrocarbon liquids and 3,500 tonnes of liquefied petroleum gas. The URL revocation inquiry reconvened in June – July 1980 with General Sir Richard Ward as the inspector. Ward concluded that the planning permission for the refinery should be allowed but only if the British Gas Corporation methane terminal on Canvey was shut down or a source of ignition installed at its perimeter. It was believed within Whitehall that in making these recommendations about the methane terminal that General Ward had exceeded his terms of reference. Wade's recommendations gave rise to another inquiry which was held by the DoE in January – May 1982 on the discontinuance of the operation of the methane terminal under the chairmanship of Alan de Piro QC. This inquiry reported in late 1982 and concluded that the methane terminal should be allowed to continue to operate, and that the 1973 URL refinery planning permission should be allowed to stand. However, by this time the oil crises of 1973 and 1980 had affected the viability of the refinery and URL undertook not further work on the site.

== See also ==
- Shell Haven
- Coryton Refinery
- Kent Refinery
