= Canvey Wick =

Protected area in Essex, England

Coordinates: 51.5225°N 0.5362°E

- Site of Special Scientific Interest
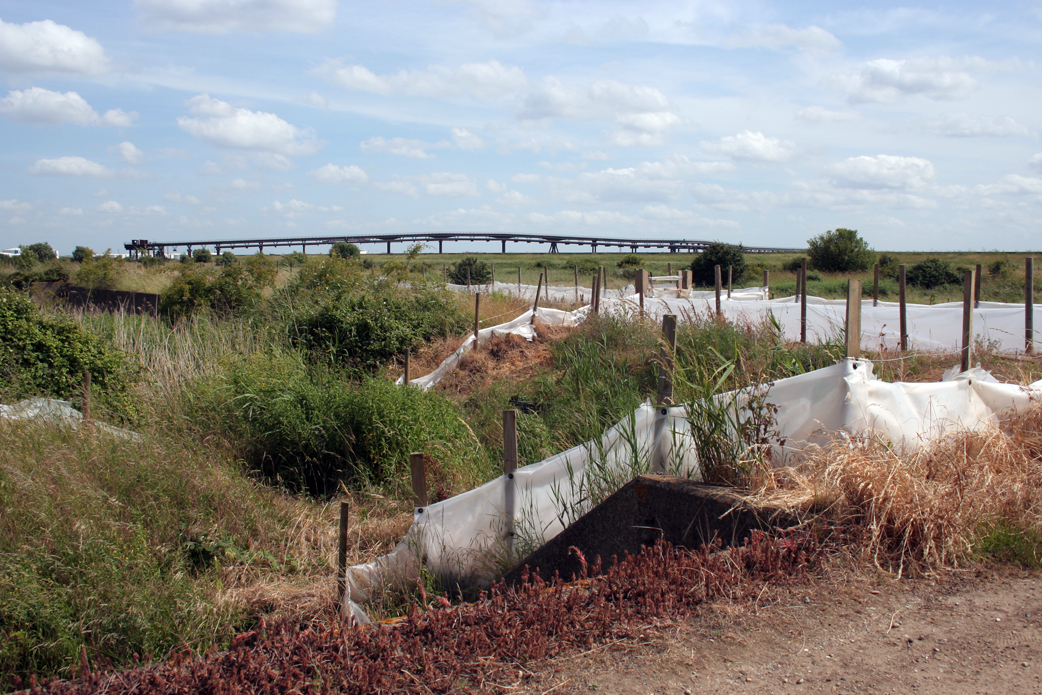
- Location of Canvey Wick.
- Area of search: Essex
- Grid reference: TQ 761834
- Interest: Biological
- Area: 93.2 ha (230 acres)
- Notification date: 2005
- Location map: Magic Map

Canvey Wick is a 93.2-hectare (230-acre) Site of Special Scientific Interest at the south-west corner of Canvey Island in Essex. It is owned by The Land Trust and 18.5 hectares (46 acres) is managed by the Royal Society for the Protection of Birds and Buglife as a nature reserve, who are working to bring more of the area under management and to improve public access.

== Description ==
Canvey Wick is in the southwest corner of Canvey Island, it is an open area situated between Holehaven Creek to the south and the grazing marshes of West Canvey Marsh to the north. It used to be an area of grazing marsh like nearby West Canvey but for many years it was used to dump dredging waste on and this raised the land by smothering the old meadows in a mixture of sand, gravel, chalk and shells.

The site was earmarked for the construction of an oil refinery for Occidental Petroleum, but the oil price crisis of 1973 meant that the refinery never opened.

The entrance to the reserve is on Northwick Road. As a result of the poor quality soil created by the dredging waste and the variable ground water conditions, a complex mix of habitat types had developed and continues to develop. The main habitat is dry grassland while there are significant areas of wetland too and these give home to a nationally significant community of invertebrates, mainly species of herb-rich grassland, bare ground, open grassland, scrubby edges and brackish wetlands. The site has been described as "a brownfield rainforest" by former Natural England officer Chris Gibson.

== Wildlife ==
Over 1,300 species of invertebrate have been recorded at Canvey Wick, these include no less than 30 species which are on the UK's red list of endangered species. Examples of nationally important insects found in the area include the Canvey Island ground beetle (Scybalicus oblongiculus), the five-banded weevil hunting wasp (Cercersis quinquefascinata), the shrill carder bee (Bombus sylvarum), the brown-banded carder bee (Bombus humilis) and the scarce emerald damselfly (Lestes dryas). Other insects recorded here include the hairy-legged mining bee or pantaloon bee (Dasypoda hirtipes), the silver y moth (Autographa gamma), marbled white (Melanargia galathea and the wall brown (Lasiommata megera). The birdlife on site includes green woodpecker, European stonechat, Western yellow wagtail and Eurasian reed warbler. The site is also important for orchids and surveys have found 1,700 common spotted orchids (Dactylorhiza fuchsii), 500 pyramidal orchids (Anacamptis pyramidalis) and 25 of the much less common bee orchid (Ophrys apifera).

== Developments ==
In 2016 the supermarket company Morrisons transferred 130 hectares (320 acres) of land to The Land Trust, and established an endowment fund to fund its management. This new area connected the existing reserves of Canvey Wick with neighbouring nature reserves such as the RSPB reserve at West Canvey Marshes. In 2018 a sculpture of a dragonfly created from recycled materials was unveiled at the site.
