= Richard Ward (British Army officer) =

British Army general

General Sir Richard Ward GBE KCB DSO* MC
- Born: 15 October 1917
- Died: 11 August 1989 (aged 71); Mendip, Somerset, England
- Military career
- Allegiance: United Kingdom
- Branch: British Army
- Service years: 1937–1976
- Rank: General
- Service number: 73199
- Unit: Royal Tank Regiment
- Commands: British Forces in Hong Kong; 1st Division; 20th Armoured Brigade; 3rd Royal Tank Regiment; Westminster Dragoons
- Conflicts: Second World War; Korean War
- Awards: Knight Grand Cross of the Order of the British Empire; Knight Commander of the Order of the Bath; Distinguished Service Order & Bar; Military Cross; Mentioned in Despatches (3); Knight of the Order of Leopold II (Belgium); Croix de guerre (Belgium)

General Sir Richard Erskine Ward, GBE, KCB, DSO & Bar, MC (15 October 1917 – 11 August 1989) was a British Army officer who served in the Second World War with distinction and later became Commander of British Forces in Hong Kong.

== Military career ==
Ward was commissioned as a second lieutenant into the Royal Tank Corps (later Royal Tank Regiment) on 26 August 1937. He served in the Second World War with the 5th Royal Tank Regiment from 1939 in the Western Desert and North Africa, taking part in the Second Battle of El Alamein and the Battle of Tunis in 1942. Ward was awarded the Military Cross in 1942, and the Distinguished Service Order and Bar in 1943. He was also Mentioned in Despatches on 24 June 1943. Ward was Brigade Major with the 4th Armoured Brigade during the Normandy landings in France in 1944. He was appointed commanding officer of the Westminster Dragoons in 1945, and Mentioned in Despatches on 9 August for his services in North-West Europe. Ward was appointed a Knight of the Order of Leopold II and awarded the Croix de guerre from the Belgian government in 1947.

Ward served with 1st Royal Tank Regiment in the Korean War in 1952, for which he was again Mentioned in Despatches, before becoming commanding officer of the 3rd Royal Tank Regiment in 1957. He was made commander of the 20th Armoured Brigade in 1963 and general officer commanding 1st Division in 1965. He went on to be Vice Adjutant-General in 1968 and was appointed a Companion of the Order of the Bath in the 1969 New Year Honours.

Ward became Commander of British Forces in Hong Kong in 1970, and was appointed a Knight Commander of the Order of the Bath in the 1971 New Year Honours. His final post was as Chief of Personnel and Logistics at the Ministry of Defence from 1974. He was appointed a Knight Grand Cross of the Order of the British Empire in the 1976 New Year Honours, and retired from the army on 24 May that year.

Ward was also colonel commandant of the Royal Tank Regiment from 1970 to 1975.

== Later life and family ==
In retirement Ward presided over an Inquiry into revoking the planning permission, granted in 1973, to United Refineries Ltd for a proposed oil refinery on Canvey Island which reported in March 1981. His findings concerning the British Gas Corporation's methane terminal were disputed by the Health and Safety Executive and the British Gas Corporation and there were doubts about his technical competence: he had conducted the inquiry without the benefit of technical assessors, and had exceeded his terms of reference.

Ward married Stella Elizabeth Ellis in 1947, with whom he had two sons and two daughters. His estate was worth £122,280 net.

Military offices
Preceded by Miles Fitzalan-Howard	General Officer Commanding 1st Division; 1965–1968	Succeeded by Allan Taylor
Preceded by Sir Basil Eugster	Commander of British Forces in Hong Kong; 1970–1973	Succeeded by Sir Edwin Bramall
