= Storage tank =

Container for liquids or compressed gas

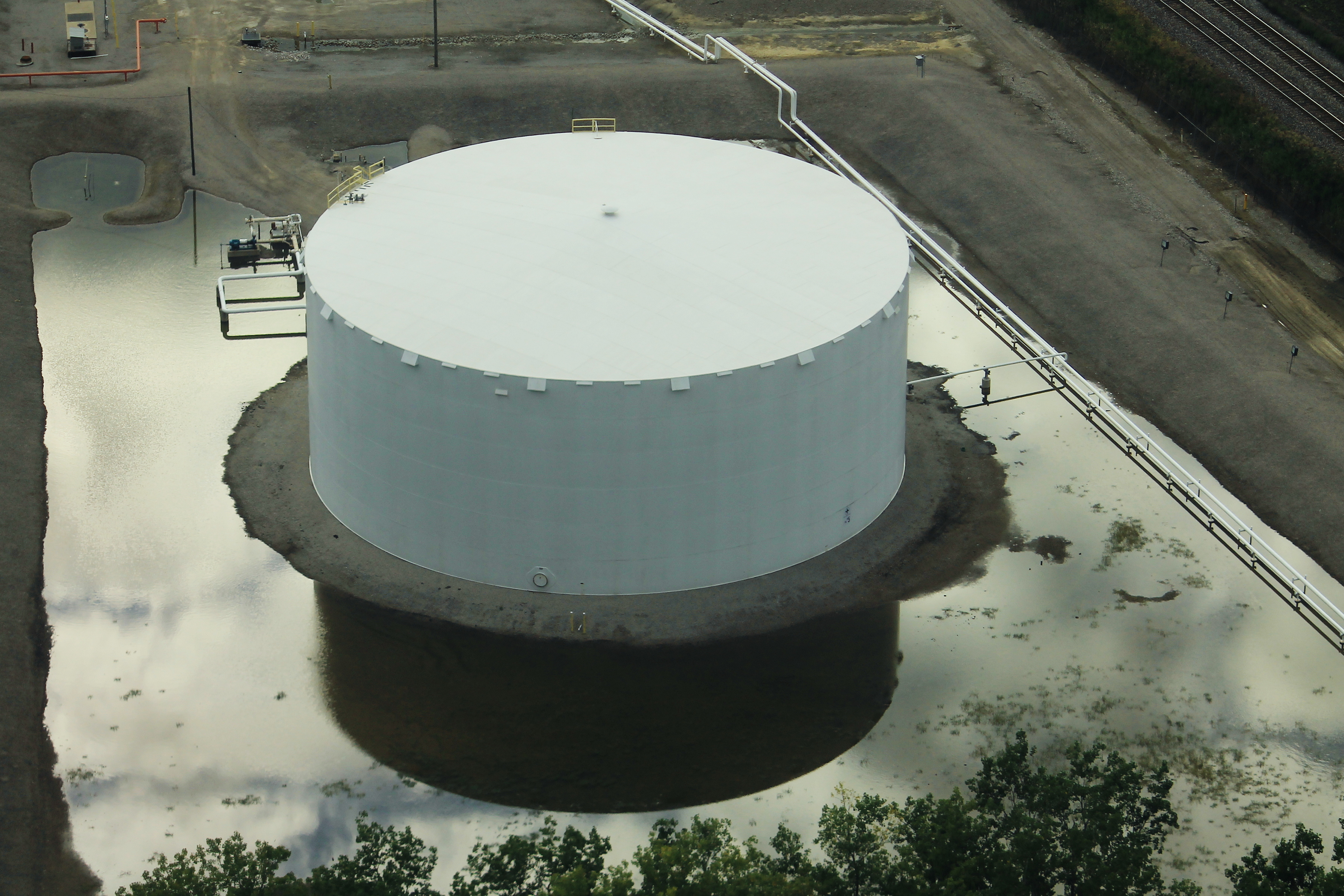
Petroleum storage tank near Detroit, United States

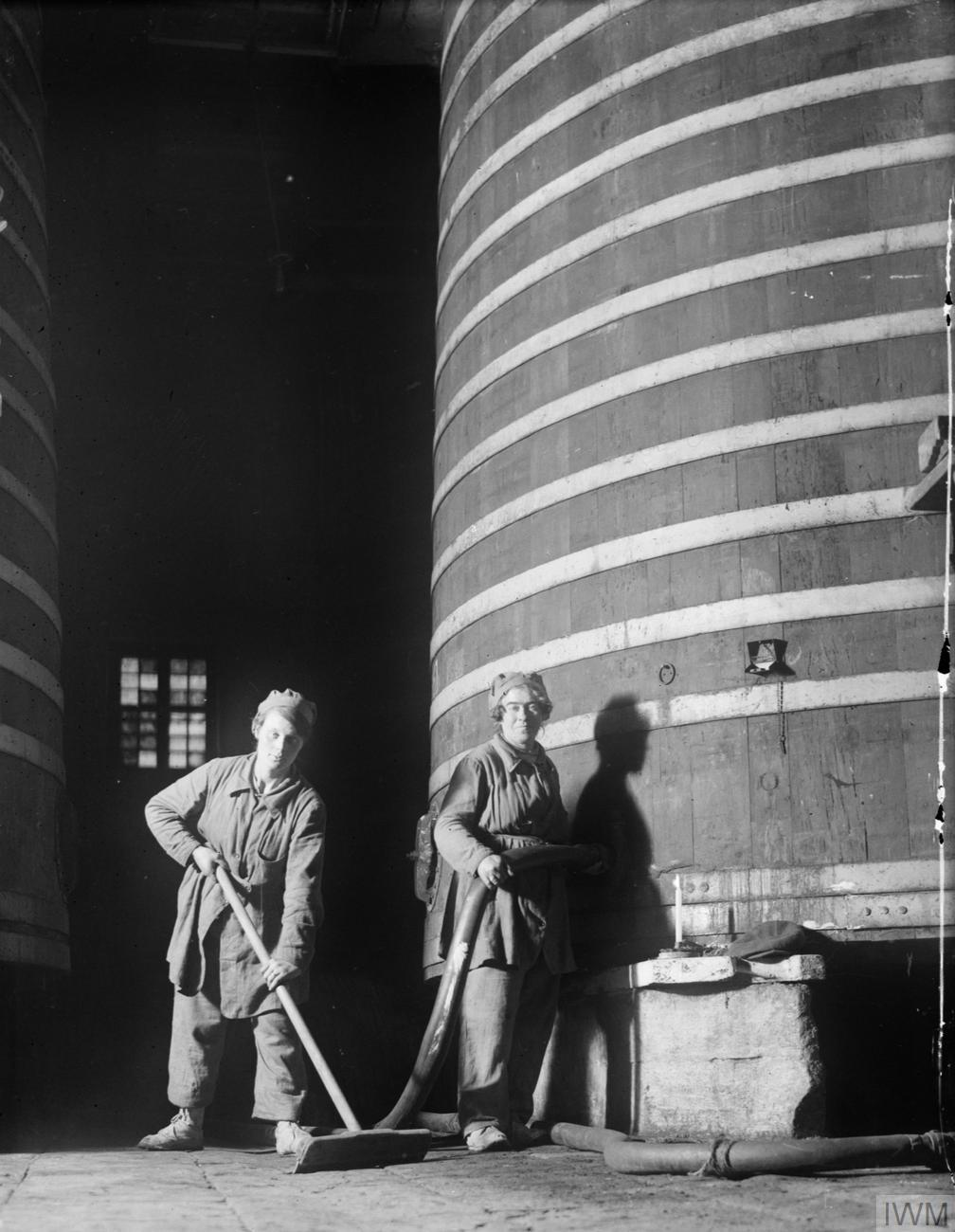
Wooden storage tanks at an English brewery, September 1918

A storage tank is a container that holds liquids or compressed gases. The term can be used for reservoirs (artificial lakes and ponds), and for manufactured containers. The usage of the word "tank" for reservoirs is uncommon in American English but is moderately common in British English. In other countries, the term tends to refer only to artificial containers. In the U.S., storage tanks operate under no (or very little) pressure, distinguishing them from pressure vessels.

Tanks can be used to hold materials as diverse as milk, water, waste, petroleum, chemicals, and other hazardous materials, all while meeting industry standards and regulations. Storage tanks are available in many shapes: vertical and horizontal cylindrical; open top and closed top; flat bottom, cone bottom, slope bottom and dish bottom. Large tanks tend to be vertical cylindrical, with flat bottoms, and a fixed frangible or floating roof, or to have rounded corners transition from the vertical side wall to bottom profile, in order to withstand hydraulic hydrostatic pressure. Tanks built below ground level are sometimes used and referred to as underground storage tanks (USTs).

Reservoirs can be covered, in which case they may be called covered or underground storage tanks or reservoirs. Covered water tanks are common in urban areas.

Tanks can be mounted on a lorry or an articulated lorry trailer. The resulting vehicle is called a road tanker (or simply tanker; tank truck in American English). Tank cars are tanks mounted on goods wagons for rail transportation.

== Etymology ==
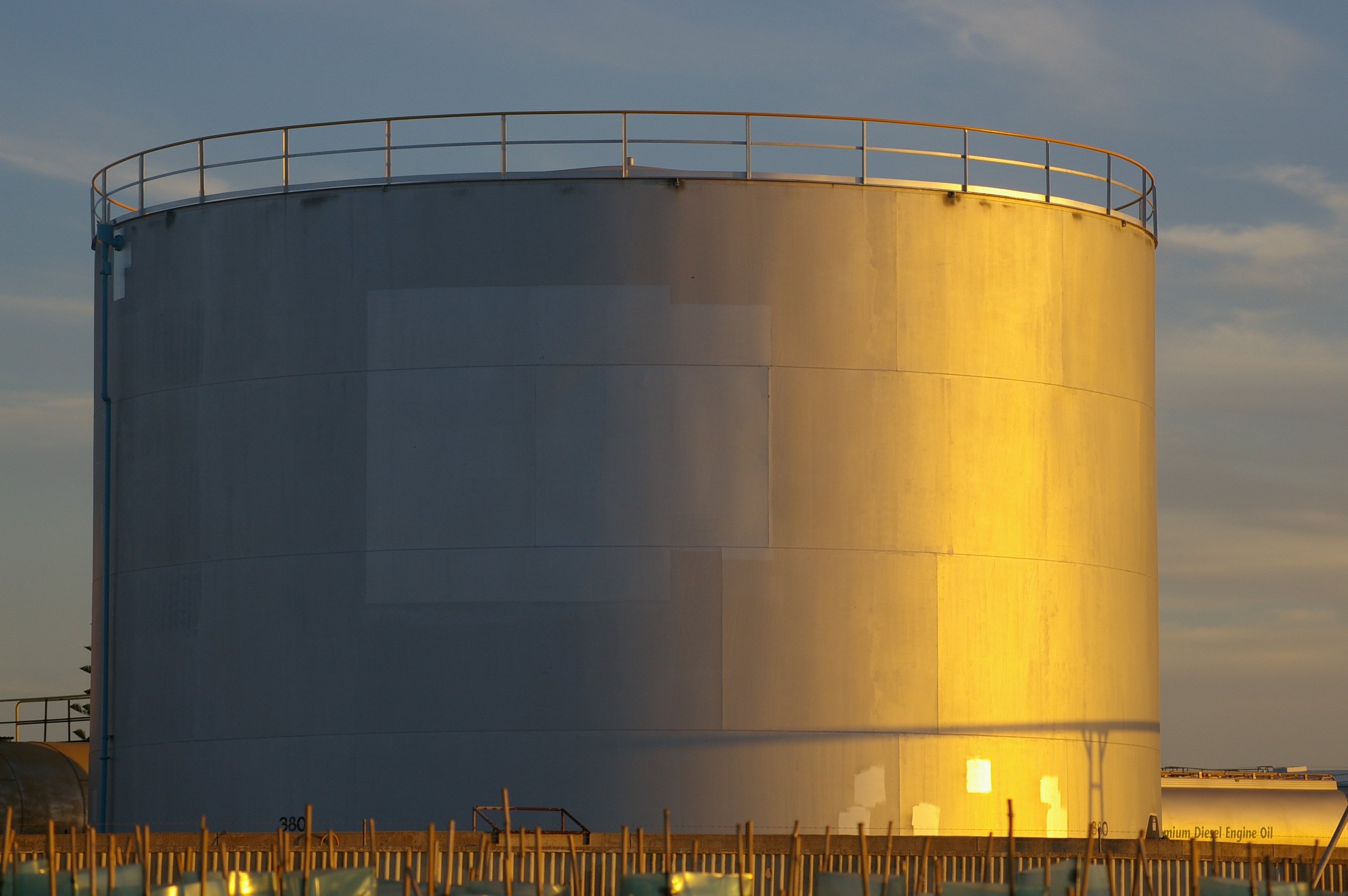
Cylindrical fuel storage tank with fixed roof and internal floating roof. Capacity approx 2,000,000 litres

The word "tank" originally meant "artificial lake" and came from India, perhaps via Portuguese tanque. It may have some connection with:

- Some Indian language words similar to "tak" or "tank" and meaning "reservoir for water". In Sanskrit a holding pond or reservoir is called a tadaka. Gujarati talao means "man-made lake". These uses of the word were incorporated into the English language.
- The Arabic verb istanqa`a اِسْتَنْقَعَ = "it [i.e. some liquid] collected and became stagnant".

== Features and maintenance ==
While steel and concrete remain the most popular choices for tanks, glass-reinforced plastic, thermoplastic and polyethylene tanks are increasing in popularity. They offer lower build costs and greater chemical resistance, especially for storage of specialty chemicals. There are several relevant standards, such as British Standard 4994 (1989), DVS 2205, and ASME RTP-1 which give advice on wall thickness, quality-control procedures, testing procedures, accreditation, fabrication and design criteria of final product.

Some storage tanks need a floating roof in addition to or in lieu of the fixed roof and structure. This floating roof rises and falls with the liquid level inside the tank, thereby decreasing the vapour space above the liquid level. Floating roofs are considered a safety requirement as well as a pollution prevention measure for many industries including petroleum refining.

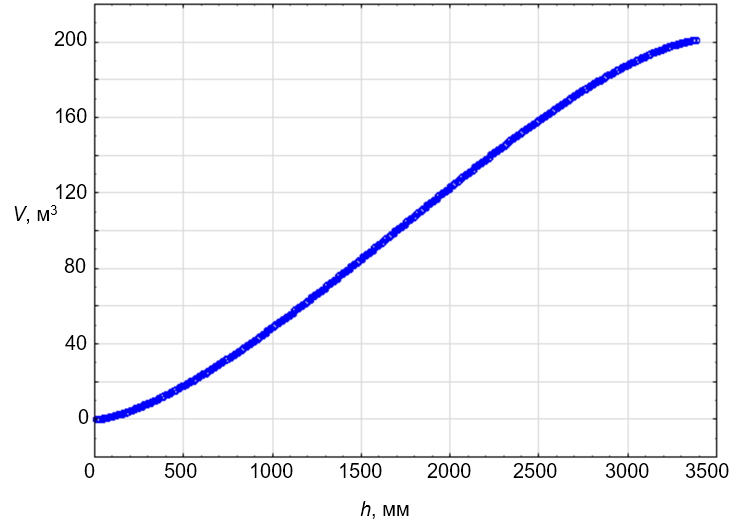
Capacity table for horizontal cylindrical storage tank

In order for volume measurements from the tank to be used, it typically has a capacity table created using appropriate standards. Each row of capacity table contains fill level value and corresponding volume value (and other related data).

In the U.S., metal tanks in contact with soil and containing petroleum products must be protected from corrosion to prevent escape of the product into the environment. The most effective and common corrosion control techniques for steel in contact with soil is cathodic protection. Outside the United States and at some locations in the United States, elevated tank support foundations with a sand bitumen mix finish are often used. These types of foundations keep the tank bottom plates free from water, therefore preventing corrosion.

In addition to their design and application, maintenance and inspection of storage tanks play a critical role in ensuring their safety and efficiency. Regular inspection is essential for identifying potential issues such as corrosion, leaks, structural weaknesses, and compliance with environmental regulations. These inspections can vary in frequency and detail depending on the type of tank, the material stored, and the regulatory requirements applicable in the location where the tank is used. For instance, tanks storing hazardous materials may require more frequent and thorough inspections compared to those used for non-hazardous materials. Maintenance protocols, including cleaning, repairs, and preventative measures, are equally important to prolong the lifespan of the tanks and prevent environmental contamination or accidents. Advanced technologies, such as remote sensing, ultrasonic testing, and robotic inspection tools, like remotely-operated drones, are increasingly being employed to enhance the effectiveness and safety of these inspection processes. Understanding and implementing appropriate inspection and maintenance schedules is paramount for operators of storage tanks to ensure operational reliability and adherence to safety standards.

Several environmental regulations apply to the design and operation of storage tanks, often depending on the nature of the fluid contained within. In the U.S., air emissions are typically required to undergo air quality permitting under the federal Clean Air Act. Quantification of potential emissions from tanks for permitting purposes is most often accomplished by applying emission equations published in chapter 7.1 of the Environmental Protection Agency's AP-42 (Compilation of Air Pollutant Emissions Factors from Stationary Sources).

Since most liquids can spill or seep through even the smallest opening, special consideration must be made for their safe and secure handling. This usually involves building a bunding, or containment dike, around the tank, so that any leakage may be safely contained.

== Types of tank ==
=== Atmospheric ===
An atmospheric tank is a container for holding a liquid at atmospheric pressure. The major design codes for welded atmospheric tanks are API 650 and API 620. API 653 is used for analysis of in-service storage tanks. In Europe the applicable design code is EN 14015, which uses load cases from Eurocode 3 (EN 1993), part 4-2.

=== High-pressure ===
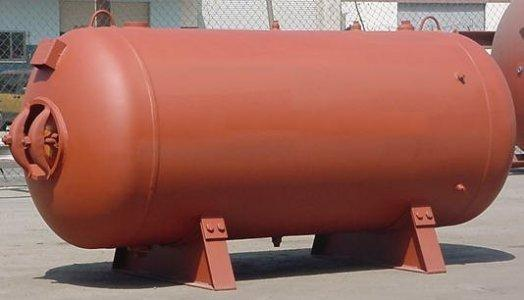
Horizontal, cylindrical shell, elliptical heads carbon steel pressure vessel

In the case of a liquefied gas such as hydrogen or chlorine, or a compressed gas such as compressed natural gas or MAPP, the storage tank must be made to withstand the sometimes-considerable pressures exerted by the contents. These tanks, being pressure vessels, are sometimes excluded from the class of "tanks". Container tanks for handling liquids during transportation are often designed to handle varying degrees of pressure.

=== Thermal storage tanks ===
One form of seasonal thermal energy storage (STES) is the use of large surface water tanks that are insulated and then covered with earth berms to enable storage of seasonal solar-thermal heat that is collected primarily in the summer for all-year heating. A related technology has become widespread in Danish district heating systems. The thermal storage medium is gravel and water in large, shallow, lined pits that are covered with insulation, soil and grass.

Ice and slush tanks are used for short-term storage of cold for use in air conditioning, allowing refrigeration equipment to be run at night when electric power is less expensive, yet provide cooling during hot daytime hours.

=== Milk tanks ===
A bulk milk cooling tank is a storage tank located in a dairy farm's milkhouse used for cooling and holding fluid milk at a low temperature until it can be picked up by a milk hauler. Since milk leaves the udder at approximately 35 °C (95 °F), milk tanks are needed to rapidly cool fresh raw milk to a storage temperature of 4 to 6 °C (39 to 43 °F), thereby slowing growth of microorganisms. Bulk milk cooling tanks are usually made of stainless steel and are constructed to sanitary standards. They must be cleaned after each milk collection. The milk cooling tank may be the property of the farmer, or may be rented by the farmer from a dairy plant.

=== Septic tanks ===
A septic tank is part of a small-scale sewage treatment system often referred to as a septic system. Septic systems are commonly used to treat wastewater from homes and small businesses in rural and suburban areas. It consists of the tank and a septic drain field. Waste water enters the tank where solids can settle and scum floats. Anaerobic digestion occurs on the settled solids, reducing the volume of solids. The water released by the system is normally absorbed by the drain field without needing any further treatment.

=== Mobile tanks ===
While not strictly a "storage" tank, mobile tanks share many of the same features of storage tanks. Also, they must be designed to deal with a heavy sloshing load and the risk of collision or other accident. Some of these include ocean-going oil tankers and LNG carriers; railroad tank cars; and road tankers. Also included are the holding tanks which are the tanks that store toilet waste on RVs, boats and aircraft.

== In refineries ==
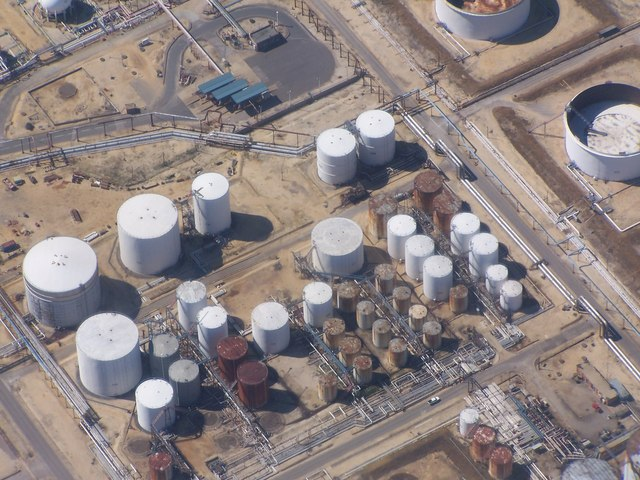
View of Fawley Refinery large atmospheric tanks

Tanks for crude oil and oil-based fuels are chosen according to the flash point of the material. If the material is not a liquefied gas, such as LPG, tanks are atmospheric and generally come in two types:

1. Fixed roof tanks are used for liquids with very high flash points (e.g., fuel oil, bitumen). Cone roofs, dome roofs and umbrella roofs are usual. These tanks may be insulated and heated with steam coils to prevent the product to become too viscous, thus plugging pipework and becoming potentially unpumpable. Dome roof tanks are meant for tanks having slightly higher-than-atmospheric storage pressure (e.g., slop oil).
2. Floating roof tanks are broadly divided into external floating roof tanks (usually referred to simply as floating roof tanks, or FR tanks) and internal floating roof types (IFR Tanks). IFR tanks are used for liquids with lower flash points (e.g., jet fuel, petrol, ethanol). They are essentially cone-roof tanks with an internal floating roof travelling vertically up and down along with the liquid level. This floating roof traps the vapour from low flash-point fuels. Floating roofs are supported with legs or cables on which they rest. FR tanks do not have a fixed roof, being open at the top, and have a floating roof only. Medium flash point liquids such as naphtha, kerosene, diesel, and crude oil are stored in these tanks.

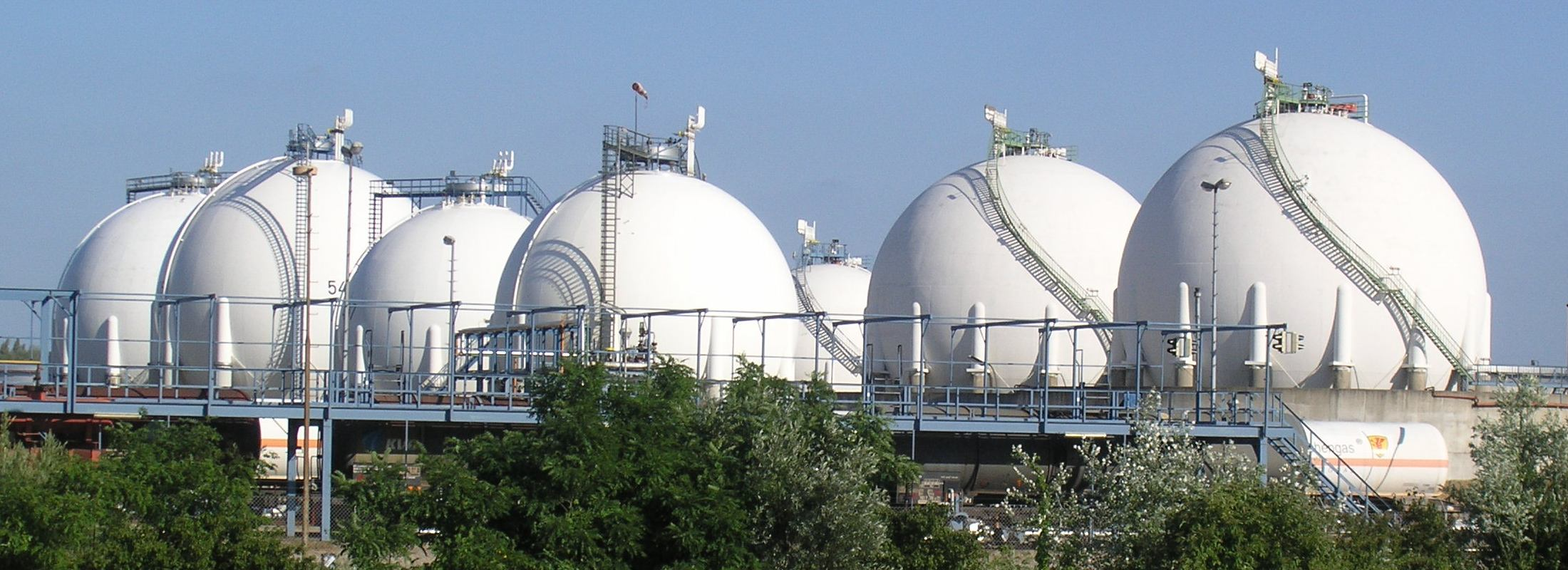
Spherical gas tank farm in the petroleum refinery in Karlsruhe MiRO

Liquefied gases (such as LPG, butane, propylene, etc.) may be stored in spherical tanks (or Horton spheres).

Typical classification codes used for tanks in a refinery are:

- OSBL – outside-battery-limit tankages
  - COT – crude oil tanks.
  - PIT – product and intermediate storage tanks.
  - DISPATCH – dispatch area tanks.
- UTILITIES – tanks in a power plant area, for storage of water, etc.
- ISBL – inside-battery-limit tankages. These are usually small tanks found in the production units of a refinery, such as neutralization tanks, water tanks, etc.

== Use for chemicals ==
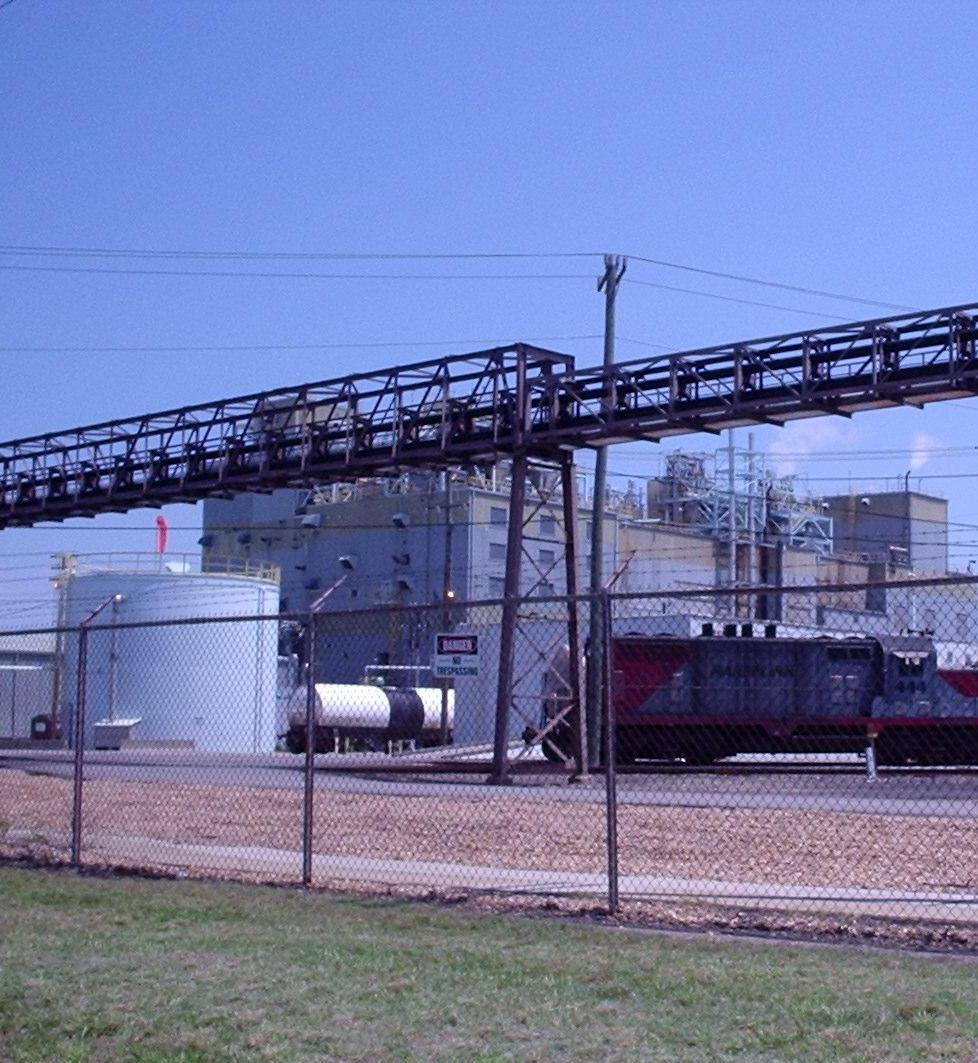
BASF chemical plant in Portsmouth, Virginia. The plant is served by the Commonwealth Railway.

Chemical tanks are storage containers for chemicals widely used within the chemical industry. They come in a variety of sizes and shapes, and are used for static storage and transport of both raw materials and finished chemical products.

A chemical tank is of necessity designed for a specific chemical. Chemicals have variable corrosion potentials, so the size and features of chemical tanks are diverse. Chemical resistance is usually the first priority in designing chemical tanks. Selected materials have to be as resistant to the chemical stored as design and economics allow. This includes selection of smaller features such as gaskets and plumbing materials. Other parameters to be taken in consideration are heat, cold, vacuum, pressure, exothermic reactivity and the inherent aggressive nature of the chemical (acids, caustic, etc.). Secondary spill containment is a back-up strategy sometimes used to mitigate potential failure of the primary container. The typical profile of a vessel with secondary containment is a primary vessel with an exterior vessel shell encompassing the primary vessel with at least 100% capacity. Secondary vessels are available in polyethylene, fiberglass and metal materials. Secondary containment tank systems are suggested for all aggressive chemicals.

== Tank failures ==
There have been numerous catastrophic failures of storage tanks, one of the most notorious being that which occurred at Boston on January 14, 1919. A large tank had only been filled eight times when it failed, and the resulting wave of molasses killed 21 people in the vicinity. The Boston molasses disaster was caused by poor design and construction, with a wall too thin to bear repeated loads from the contents. The tank had not been tested before use by filling with water, and was also poorly riveted. The owner of the tank, United States Industrial Alcohol Company, paid out $300,000 (nearly $4 million in 2012) in compensation to the victims or their relatives.

There have been many other accidents caused by tanks since then, often caused by faulty welding or by sub-standard steel. New inventions have at least fixed some of the more common issues around the tanks' seal. However, storage tanks also present another problem, surprisingly, when empty. If they have been used to hold oil or oil products such as gasoline, the atmosphere in the tanks may be highly explosive as the space fills with hydrocarbons. If new welding operations are started, then sparks can easily ignite the contents, with disastrous results for the welders. The problem is similar to that of empty bunkers on tanker ships, which are now required to use an inert gas blanket to prevent explosive atmospheres building up from residues.

== Images ==
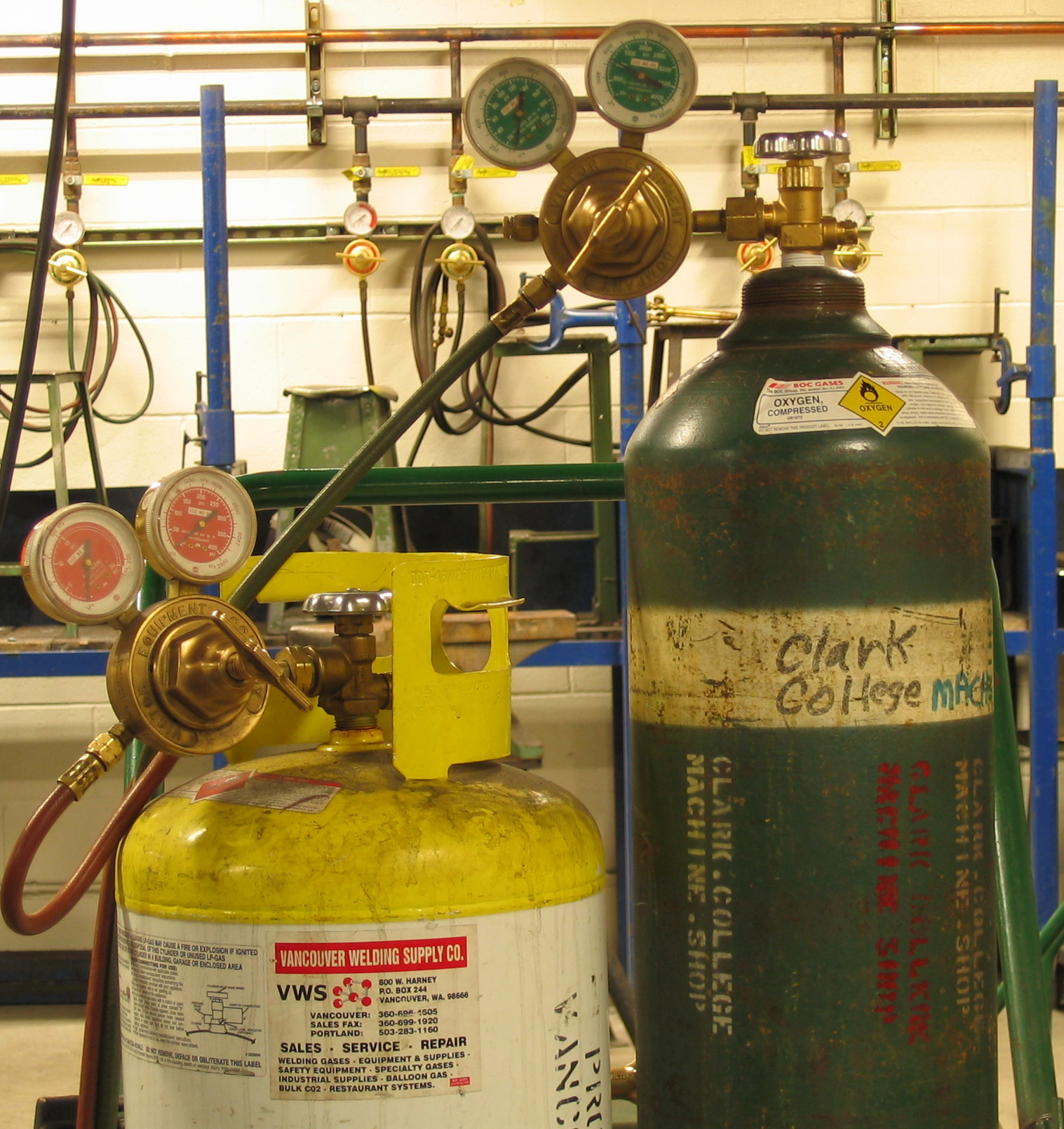
Oxygen and MAPP gas cylinders

Milk cooling tank

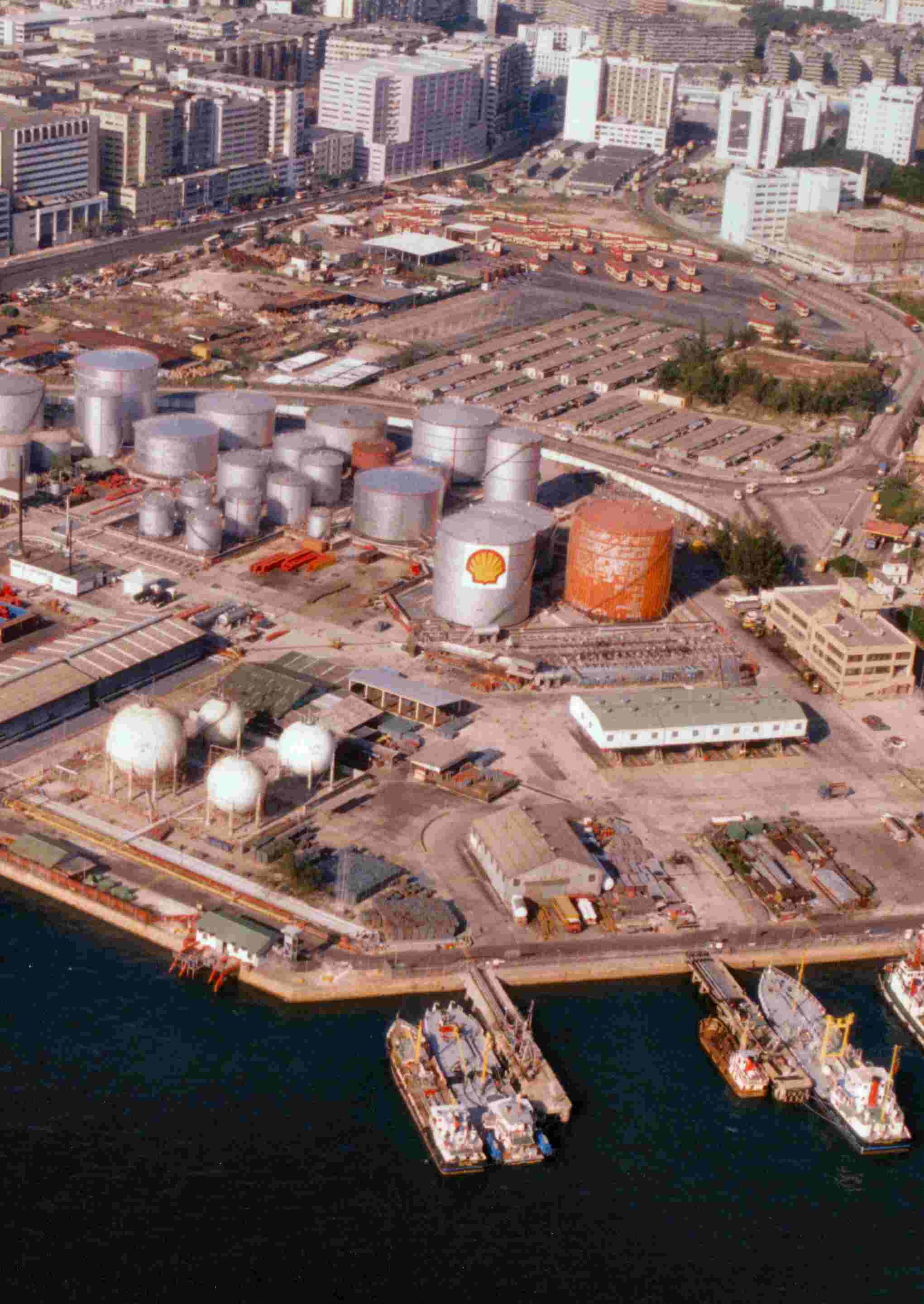
Fuel tanks

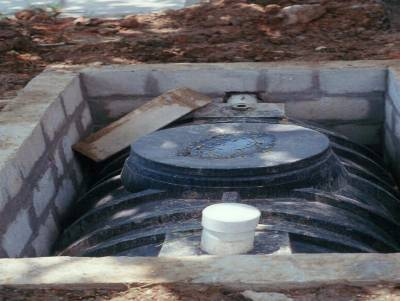
Septic tank

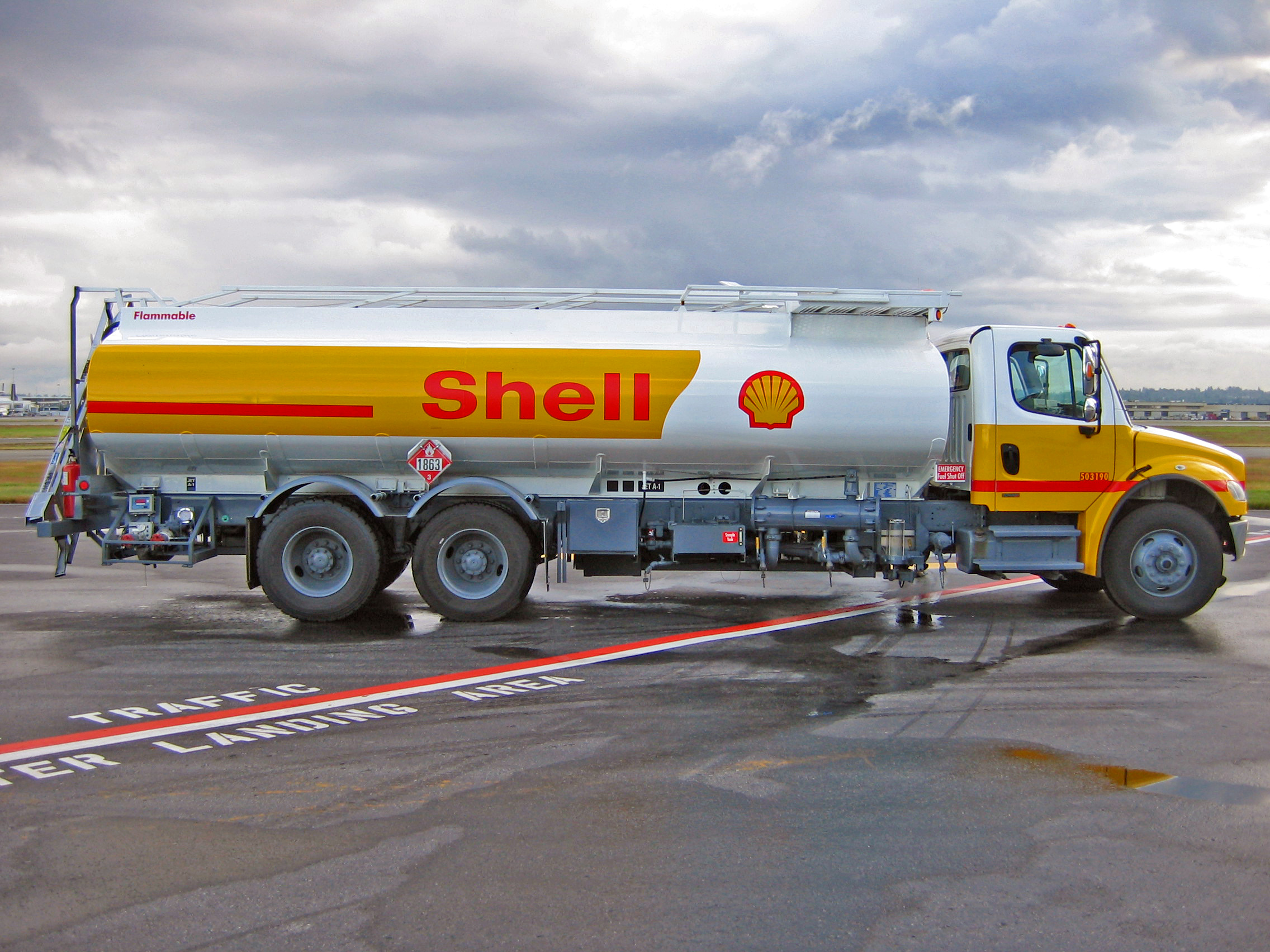
Tanker truck

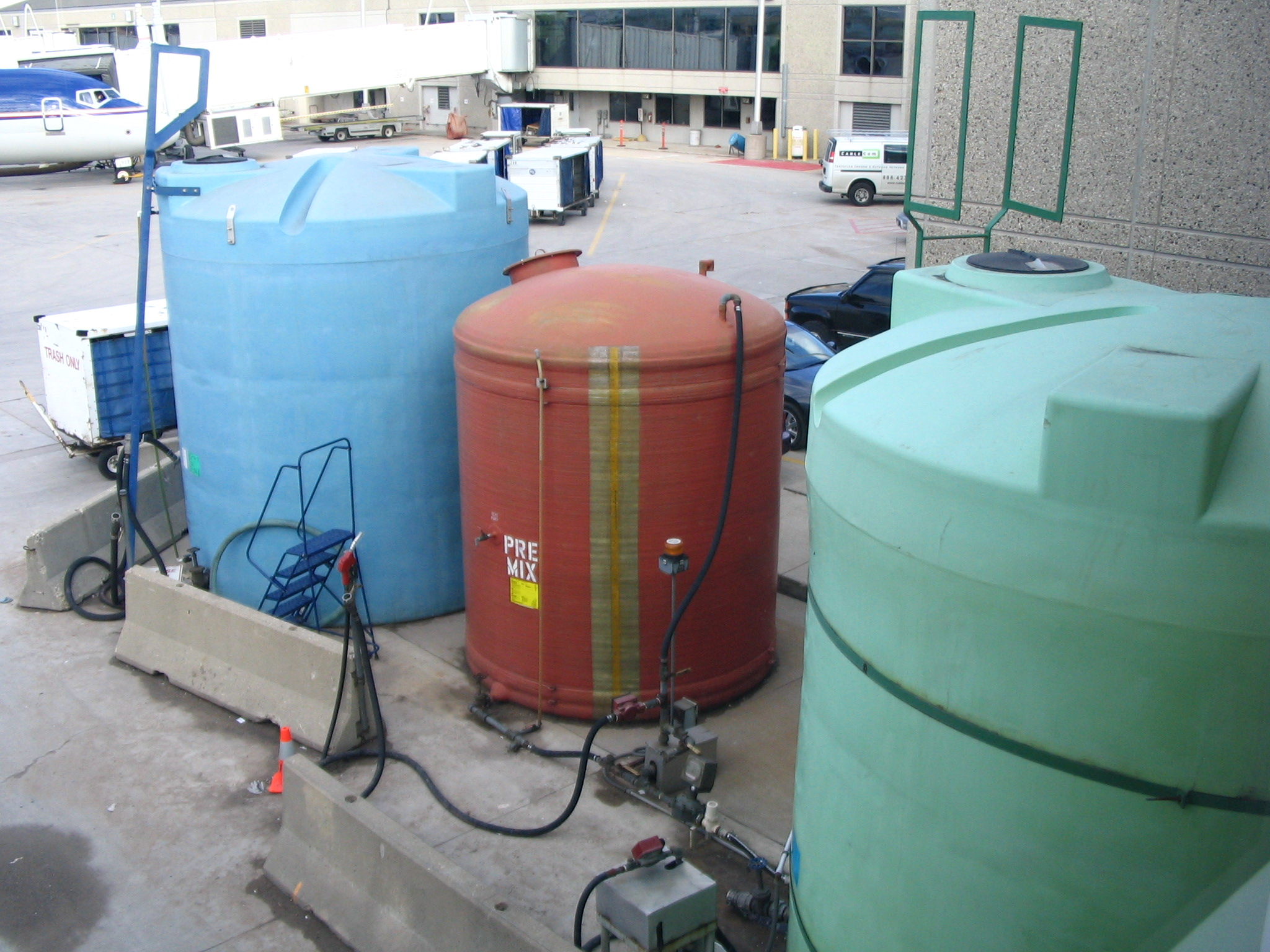
Several large tanks at an airport. For scale, note concrete highway barriers.

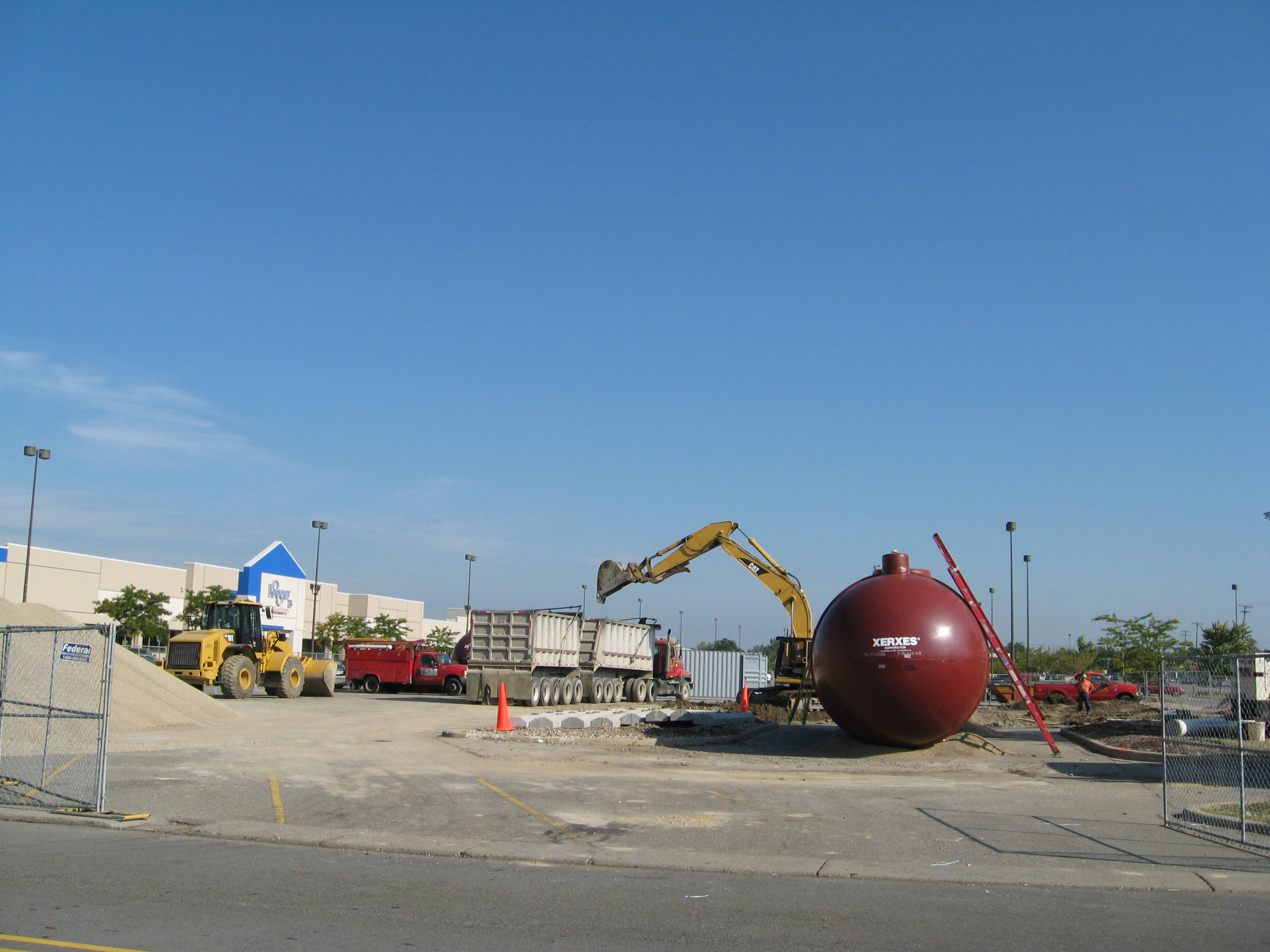
Underground fuel storage tank for service station

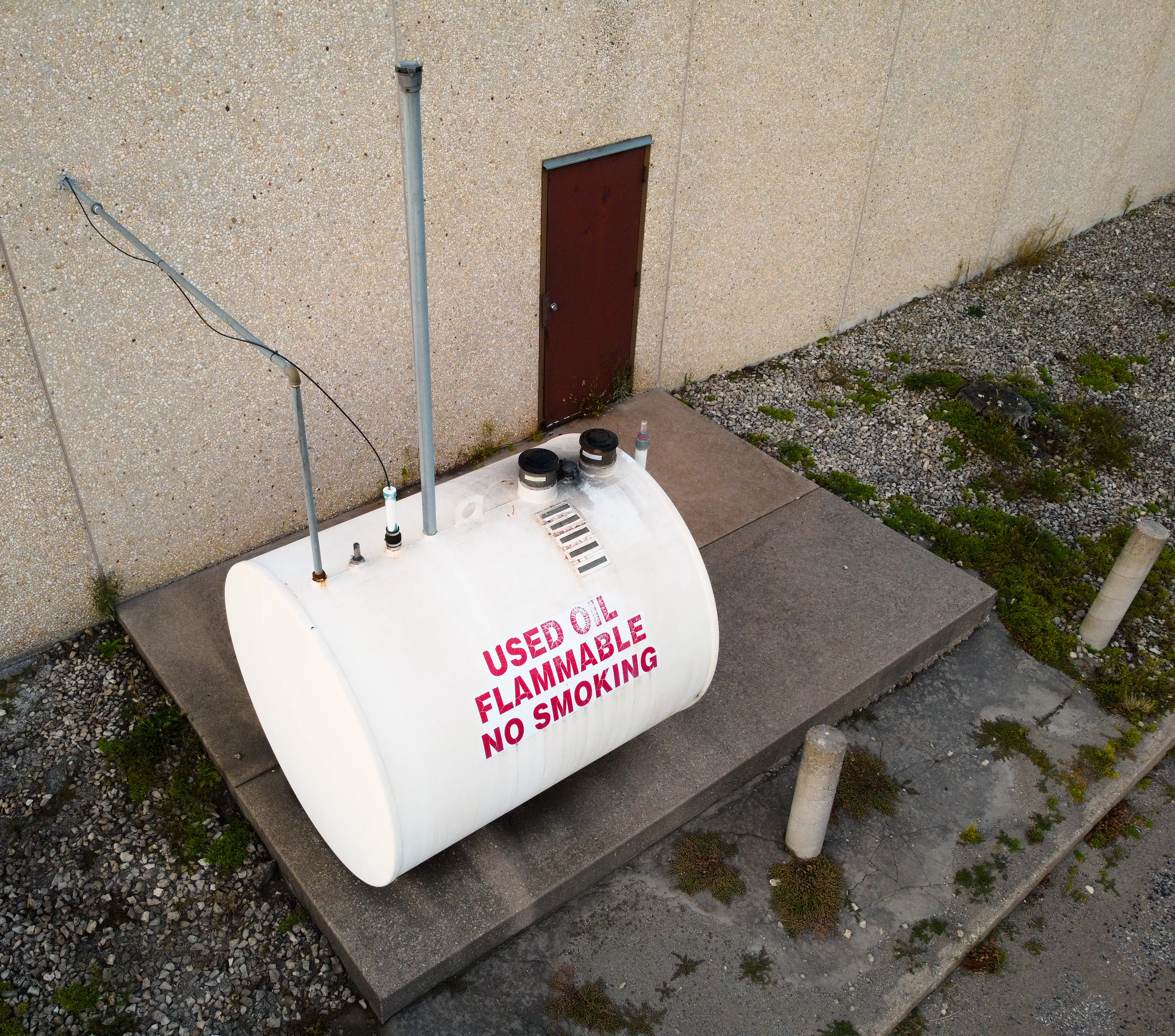
Fuel tank

== See also ==
- Aquarium – Transparent tank of water for fish and water-dwelling species, also known as a "fish tank"
- Ballast tank – Compartment for holding liquid ballast
- Drop tank – External tanks used to carry extra fuel, in aviation
- Dunk tank – Attraction with the goal of dropping a target into a tank of water
- Fuel tank – Safe container for flammable fluids, e.g., for a vehicle or oil heater
- Gas cylinder – Cylindrical container for storing pressurised gas
- Horton sphere – Spherical tank
- Irrigation tank – Water reservoir, in India, an artificial lake or reservoir of any size
- Isolation tank – Sensory deprivation tank
- LNG storage tank – Atmospheric tank for the storage of liquefied natural gas
- Rainwater tank – Container for collecting and storing rainwater
- Rotating tank – Fluid dynamics, used for fluid mechanics experiments
- Scuba tank – High pressure compressed gas cylinder used to store and supply breathing gas for diving a container which holds a supply of air for breathing underwater
- Stock tank – Drinking water tank for animals, for watering livestock
- Temple tank – Wells or reservoirs built as part of the temple complex near Indian temples, in India, a well or reservoir built as part of a temple complex
- Underground storage tank – Storage tank that is partially or fully underground
- Vapour-tight tank – Oilfield equipment to store and vent gas
- Water tank – Container for storing water
