= Oil terminals in India =

The major oil terminals / depots in India are:

- Agra Terminal of IOCL
- Manmad Terminals of IOCL, BPCL and HPCL
- Irumpanam Terminal of BPCL in Kochi
- Jalandhar Terminals of IOCL, BPCL and HPCL
- Ambala Terminal of IOCL, BPCL and HPCL
- Kondapalli Terminal of IOCL BPCL and HPCL near Vijayawada
- Mangaluru terminal of IOCL, BPCL and HPCL
- Sangrur terminal of IOCL, BPCL and HPCL
- Bhatinda terminal of IOCL, BPCL and HPCL
- Jammu Depot of IOCL
- Srinagar depot of IOCL, BPCL and HPCL
- Parwanoo depot of IOCL
- Kandla Foreshore Terminal of IOCL which is the largest POL terminal of IOCL
- Rewari Terminal of IOCL, BPCL and HPCL
- Bijwasan Terminal of IOCL near Delhi
- Shakurbasti terminal of IOCL
- Panipat Marketing Complex of IOCL, BPCL and HPCL
- Mathura Terminal of IOCL
- Sanganer Terminal of IOCL near Jaipur

== See also ==
- Renewable energy in India
- Energy law#India
