= External floating roof tank =

Storage facility

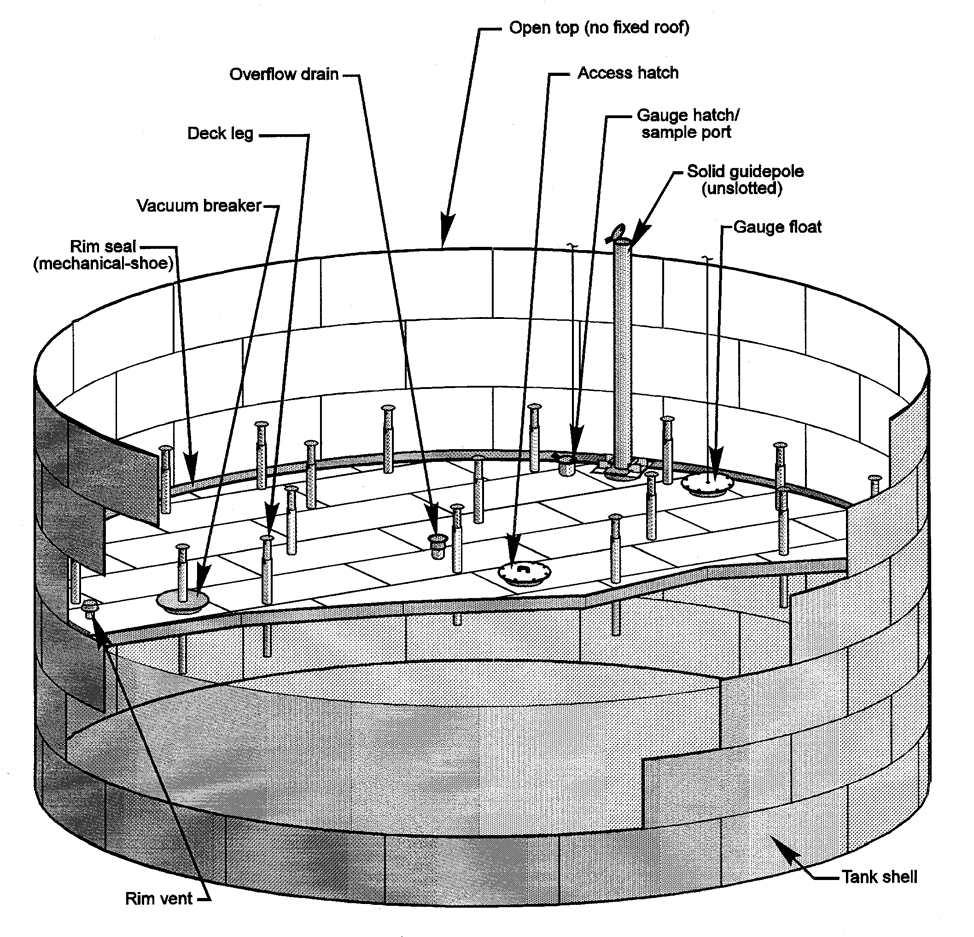
External floating roof tank (double deck type)

An external floating roof tank is a storage tank commonly used to store large quantities of petroleum products such as crude oil or condensate. It consists of an open- topped cylindrical steel shell equipped with a roof that floats on the surface of the stored liquid. The roof rises and falls with the liquid level in the tank. As opposed to a fixed roof tank there is no vapor space (ullage) in the floating roof tank (except for very low liquid level situations). In principle, this eliminates tank breathing loss and greatly reduces the evaporative loss of the stored liquid. There is a rim seal system between the tank shell and roof to reduce rim evaporation.

The roof has support legs hanging down into the liquid. At low liquid levels the roof eventually lands and a vapor space forms between the liquid surface and the roof, similar to a fixed roof tank. The support legs are usually retractable to increase the working volume of the tank.

== Advantages ==
External roof tanks are usually installed for environmental or economical reasons to limit product loss and reduce the likelihood of emission of volatile organic compounds (VOCs) and other potential air pollutants.

Normally, the roof of the tank rests directly on the surface of the stored liquid, leaving little vapor space and consequently leading to a much lower risk of rim space fire.

== Disadvantages ==
Snow and rain water can accumulate on the roof. Roofs are exposed to sunlight and weather which can accelerate corrosion.

== System function ==
Water on the roof is usually drained by a special flexible hose or other special drain line system that runs from drain-sumps on the roof, through the stored liquid to a drain valve on the shell at the base of the tank. A hose is the shortest quickest route, Other drain systems are available both rigid and semi-rigid. These are named 'Articulated' as they use straight lengths of steel pipes with mechanical swivel joints or consist of steel pipes with flexible sections.
