= Fixed roof tank =

Liquid storage

A fixed roof tank is a type of storage tank, used to store liquids, consisting of a cone- or dome-shaped roof that is permanently affixed to a cylindrical shell. Newer storage tanks are typically fully welded and designed to be both liquid- and vapor-tight. Older tanks, however, are often riveted or bolted, and are not vapor tight. A breather valve (pressure-vacuum valve), commonly installed on many fixed roof tanks, allows the tank to operate at a slight internal pressure or vacuum. This valve prevents the release of vapors during very small changes in temperature, barometric pressure, or liquid level. Fixed roof tanks without breather valves will generally be freely vented; thus the emissions from a fixed roof tank can be non-trivial. Gauge hatches, sample wells, float gauges, and roof manholes provide accessibility to these tanks, and also act as potential sources of volatile emissions.

== Applications ==
Storage tanks in general, and fixed roof tanks in particular, containing organic liquids can be found in many industries, including:

- petroleum production and refining;
- petrochemical and chemical manufacturing
- bulk storage and transfer operations
- other industries consuming organic liquids

Fixed roof tanks are typically used with products that have relatively low volatilities and flash points. Using a fixed roof tank to store a product with high volatility can lead to product losses as vapors escape the enclosure.

== See also ==
- External floating roof tank
