= List of honorary fellows of Trinity College, Cambridge =

This is a list of honorary fellows of Trinity College, Cambridge. A list of current honorary fellows is published on the college's website at Honorary Fellows.

- Bryan Birch
- Alec Broers, Baron Broers
- Robert Carnwath, Lord Carnwath of Notting Hill
- Sue Carr, Baroness Carr of Walton-on-the-Hill
- Charles III
- Richard Chartres, Baron Chartres
- Sir Anthony Cheetham
- Geoffrey Cross, Baron Cross of Chelsea
- Sir Partha Dasgupta
- Jared Diamond
- John Donaldson, Baron Donaldson of Lymington
- Prince Philip, Duke of Edinburgh
- Daan Frenkel
- Sir Richard Friend
- Christopher Garrett
- Walter Gilbert
- Peter Goddard
- Jeffrey Goldstone
- Sir Antony Gormley
- Anthony Grafton
- Ian Hacking
- Roy Kerr
- Michael L. Klein
- Sir Aaron Klug
- Geoffrey Lane, Baron Lane
- Dominic Lieven
- James Mackay, Baron Mackay of Clashfern
- Sir Noel Malcolm
- Hisashi Owada
- Anand Panyarachun
- Stuart Parkin
- Sir Mark Pepys
- Venki Ramakrishnan
- David Richards, Lord Richards of Camberwell
- Martin Rudwick
- Simon Schaffer
- Stephen M. Schwebel
- Ali Smith
- Dame Marilyn Strathern
- Sir Peter Swinnerton-Dyer
- Thant Myint-U
- Stephen Toope
- Robert Walker, Baron Walker of Gestingthorpe
- Dame Judith Weir
- Justin Welby
- Sir Andrew Wiles
