= Sylvester Medal =

Bronze medal awarded by the Royal Society (London)

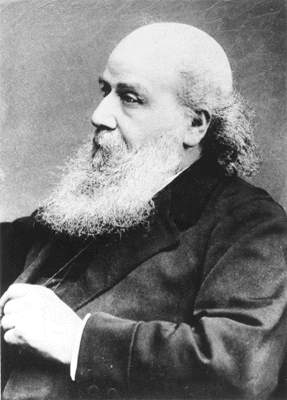
- James Joseph Sylvester, after whom the award is named
- Awarded for: "outstanding contributions in the field of mathematics"
- Date: 1901
- Country: United Kingdom
- Presented by: Royal Society
- Website: royalsociety.org/medals-and-prizes/sylvester-medal/

The Sylvester Medal is a bronze medal awarded by the Royal Society for the encouragement of mathematical research, and accompanied by a £1,000 prize. It was named in honour of James Joseph Sylvester, the Savilian Professor of Geometry at the University of Oxford in the 1880s, and first awarded in 1901, having been suggested by a group of Sylvester's friends (primarily Raphael Meldola) after his death in 1897. Initially awarded every three years with a prize of around £900, the Royal Society have announced that starting in 2009 it will be awarded every two years instead, and is to be aimed at 'early to mid career stage scientist' rather than an established mathematician. The award winner is chosen by the Society's A-side awards committee, which handles physical rather than biological science awards.

As of 2021, 45 medals have been awarded, of which all but 10 have been awarded to citizens of the United Kingdom, two to citizens of France and United States, and one medal each has been won by citizens of New Zealand, Germany, Austria, Russia, Italy, Sweden and South Africa. As of 2021 three women have won the medal, Mary Cartwright in 1964, Dusa McDuff in 2018, and Frances Kirwan in 2021.

== List of recipients ==
List of recipients of the Sylvester Medal
| Year | Portrait | Name | Nationality | Rationale | Notes |
|---|---|---|---|---|---|
| 1901 | Black-and-white portrait of Henri Poincaré | Henri Poincaré | French | "For his many and important contributions to mathematical science." | |
| 1904 | Black-and-white photographic portrait of Georg Cantor | Georg Cantor | German | "For his researches in the theories of aggregates and of sets of points of the arithmetic continuum, of transfinite numbers, and Fourier's series." | |
| 1907 | Black-and-white photographic portrait of Wilhelm Wirtinger | Wilhelm Wirtinger | Austrian | "For his contributions to the general theory of functions." | |
| 1910 | Black-and-white photographic portrait of Henry Frederick Baker | Henry Frederick Baker | British | "For his researches in the theory of Abelian functions and for his edition of Sylvester's 'Collected Works'" | |
| 1913 | Black-and-white photographic portrait of James Whitbread Lee Glaisher | James Whitbread Lee Glaisher | British | "For his mathematical researches." | |
| 1916 | Black-and-white photographic portrait of Jean Gaston Darboux | Jean Gaston Darboux | French | "For his contributions to mathematical science." | |
| 1919 | Black-and-white photographic portrait of Percy MacMahon | Percy Alexander MacMahon | British | "For his researches in pure mathematics, especially in connection with the partition of numbers and analysis" | |
| 1922 | Black-and-white photographic portrait of Tullio Levi-Civita | Tullio Levi-Civita | Italian | "For his researches in geometry and mechanics" | |
| 1925 | Full body portrait of Alfred North Whitehead | Alfred North Whitehead | British | "For his researches on the foundations of mathematics" | |
| 1928 | alt-Black-and-white photographic portrait of William Henry Young | William Henry Young | British | "For his contributions to the theory of functions of a real variable" | |
| 1931 | Portrait of Edmund Taylor Whittaker | Edmund Taylor Whittaker | British | "For his original contributions to both pure and applied mathematics" | |
| 1934 | | Bertrand Russell | British | "For his distinguished work on the foundations of mathematics" | |
| 1937 | Black-and-white portrait of Augustus Edward Hough Love | Augustus Edward Hough Love | British | "In recognition of his researches in classical mathematical physics" | |
| 1940 | Black-and0white portrait of Godfrey Harold Hardy | Godfrey Harold Hardy | British | "For his important contributions to many branches of pure mathematics." | |
| 1943 | | John Edensor Littlewood | British | "For his mathematical discoveries and supreme insight in the analytical theory of numbers." | |
| 1946 | — | George Neville Watson | British | "For his distinguished contributions to pure mathematics in the field of mathematical analysis and in particular for his work on asymptotic expansion and on general transforms. | |
| 1949 | Portrait of Louis Joel Mordell | Louis Joel Mordell | British | "For his distinguished researches in pure mathematics, especially for his discoveries in the theory of numbers." | |
| 1952 | — | Abram Samoilovitch Besicovitch | Russian | "For his outstanding work on almost-periodic functions, the theory of measure and integration and many other topics of theory of functions." | |
| 1955 | — | Edward Charles Titchmarsh | British | "For his distinguished researches on the Riemann zeta-function, analytical theory of numbers, Fourier analysis, and eigenfunction expansions." | |
| 1958 | Black-and-white photographic portrait of Max Newman | Max Newman | British | "for his distinguished contributions to combinatory topology, Boolean algebras and mathematical logic." | |
| 1961 | Full body portrait of Philip Hall | Philip Hall | British | "For his distinguished researches in algebra." | |
| 1964 | Black-and-white photographic portrait of Mary Cartwright | Mary Cartwright | British | "For her distinguished contributions to analysis and the theory of functions of a real and complex variable." | |
| 1967 | Black-and-white photographic portrait of Harold Davenport | Harold Davenport | British | "For his many distinguished contributions to the theory of numbers." | |
| 1970 | — | George Frederick James Temple | British | "For his many distinguished contributions to applied mathematics, especially in his work on distribution theory." | |
| 1973 | — | John William Scott Cassels | British | "For his numerous important contributions to the theory of numbers." | |
| 1976 | Black-and-white photographic portrait of David George Kenall | David George Kendall | British | "For his many distinguished contributions to probability theory and its applications." | |
| 1979 | Black-and-white portrait of Graham Higman | Graham Higman | British | "For his distinguished and profoundly influential contributions to the theory of finite and infinite groups. | |
| 1982 | Black-and-white photographic portrait of John Frank Adams | John Frank Adams | British | "For his solution of several outstanding problems of algebraic topology and of the methods he invented for this purpose which have proved of prime importance in the theory of the subject." | |
| 1985 | Photographic portrait of John Griggs Thompson | John Griggs Thompson | American | "For his fundamental contributions leading to the complete classification of all finite simple groups." | |
| 1988 | Photographic portrait of Charles T. C. Wall | Charles T. C. Wall | British | "For his contributions to the topology of manifolds and related topics in algebra and geometry." | |
| 1991 | | Klaus Friedrich Roth | British | "For his many contributions to number theory and in particular his solution of the famous problem concerning approximating algebraic numbers by rationals." | |
| 1994 | — | Peter Whittle | New Zealander | "For his major distinctive contributions to time series analysis, to optimisation theory, and to a wide range of topics in applied probability theory and the mathematics of operational research." | |
| 1997 | Photographic portrait of Harold Scott MacDonald Coxeter | Harold Scott MacDonald Coxeter | British; Canadian | "For his achievements in geometry, notably projective geometry, non-euclidean geometry and the analysis of spatial shapes and patterns, and for his substantial contributions to practical group-theory which pervade much modern mathematics." | |
| 2000 | Photographic portrait of Nigel James Hitchin | Nigel James Hitchin | British | "For his important contributions to many parts of differential geometry combining this with complex geometry, integrable systems and mathematical physics interweaving the most modern ideas with the classical literature." | |
| 2003 | Photograph of Lennart Carleson | Lennart Carleson | Swedish | "For his deep and fundamental contributions to mathematics in the field of analysis and complex dynamics." | |
| 2006 | Photograph of Peter Swinnerton-Dyer | Peter Swinnerton-Dyer | British | "For his fundamental work in arithmetic geometry and his many contributions to the theory of ordinary differential equations." | |
| 2009 | Portrait of John M. Ball | John M. Ball | British | "For his seminal work in mechanics and nonlinear analysis and his encouragement of mathematical research in developing countries." | |
| 2010 | Photograph of Graeme Segal | Graeme Segal | British | "For his highly influential and elegant work on the development of topology, geometry and quantum field theory, bridging the gap between physics and pure mathematics." | |
| 2012 | — | John Francis Toland | British; Irish | "For his original theorems and remarkable discoveries in nonlinear partial differential equations, including applications to water waves." | |
| 2014 | Photograph of Ben Green | Ben Green | British | "For his famous result on primes in arithmetic progression, and his subsequent proofs of a number of spectacular theorems over the last five to ten years." | |
| 2016 | Photograph of Timothy Gowers | Timothy Gowers | British | "For his groundbreaking results in the theory of Banach spaces, pure combinatorics, and additive number theory." | |
| 2018 | Photograph of Dusa McDuff | Dusa McDuff | British | "For leading the development of the new field of symplectic geometry and topology." | |
| 2019 | Photograph of Peter Sarnak | Peter Sarnak | American; South African | "For transformational contributions across number theory, combinatorics, analysis and geometry." | |
| 2020 | Photograph of Bryan John Birch | Bryan John Birch | British | "For driving the theory of elliptic curves, through the Birch-Swinnerton-Dyer conjecture and the theory of Heegner points." | |
| 2021 | Photograph of Frances Kirwan | Frances Kirwan | British | "For her research on quotients in algebraic geometry, including links with symplectic geometry and topology, which has had many applications." | |
| 2022 | Black-and-white photographic portrait of Roger Heath-Brown | Roger Heath-Brown | British | "For his many important contributions to the study of prime numbers and solutions to equations in integers." | |
| 2023 | Photograph of Miles Reid | Miles Reid | British | "For his exceptionally creative research and fundamental insights into higher-dimensional algebraic geometry, in particular the minimal model program for 3-folds, and for untiring work for the community of algebraic geometers." | |
| 2024 | | Philip Maini | British | "For his contributions to mathematical biology, especially the interdisciplinary modelling of biomedical phenomena and systems." | |
| 2025 | | Martin Hairer | British | "For profound contributions to the fields of probability and analysis, as one of the leading figures in stochastic partial differential equations." | |
| 2026 | | Wendelin Werner | French | "For playing an instrumental role in the development of the Schramm-Loewner evolution, a random curve which describes the scaling limit of many models from statistical mechanics in two dimensions." | |

== See also ==
- Awards, lectures and medals of the Royal Society
- List of mathematics awards
