= Luminato =

Annual arts festival in Toronto, Canada

Luminato Festival
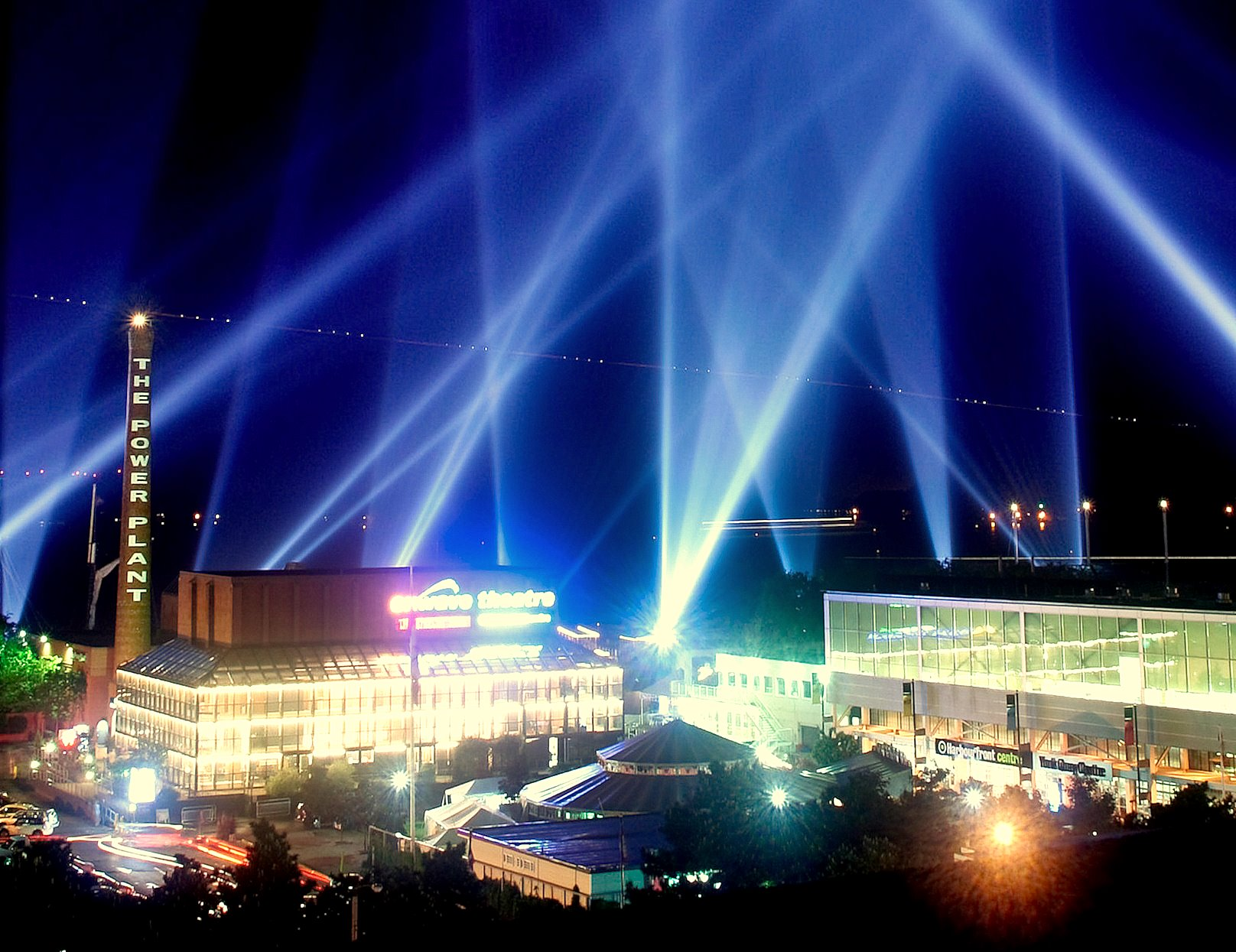
- Location: Toronto, Ontario, Canada
- Founded: 2007
- Artistic director: Naomi Campbell
- Festival date: 10 days each June
- Website: Luminato Festival Official Website

The Luminato Festival, Toronto's International Festival of Arts and Ideas, is an annual celebration of the arts in Toronto, Ontario, Canada, launched in 2007. In its first decade, Luminato presented over 3,000 performances featuring 11,000 artists from over 40 countries and has commissioned over 80 new works of art.

== History ==
Luminato was founded in 2007 by Tony Gagliano, executive chairman and CEO of St. Joseph Communications, and the late David Pecaut, CM, senior partner at the Boston Consulting Group.

=== People ===
Janice Price was Luminato's first CEO and remained in this position until November 2014. Anthony Sargent was appointed CEO in May 2015 and Celia Smith took over the role in 2020.

Chris Lorway was the festival's first artistic director, from 2007 until 2011, and was followed by Jörn Weisbrodt, a German arts administrator and past director of Robert Wilson's Watermill Center, who held the role from September 2012 to June 2016.

In July 2016, Josephine Ridge, former creative director of the Melbourne Festival and executive director of the Sydney Festival, was named Luminato's new artistic director, staying until 2018.

Naomi Campbell, who joined the festival as company manager in 2011 and was appointed its first-ever deputy artistic director in 2013, was named artistic director in September 2018. Campbell held the role until 2023.

== Editions ==
Iteration	Dates	Highlights
15th	October 13–17, 2021	Shifted due to the pandemic, the 2021 festival included film and digital experience and a drive-in concert; Edward Burtynsky's In the Wake of Progress appeared on screens at Yonge-Dundas Square (now Sankofa Square); New Monuments co-curated by Julien Christian Lutz PKA Director X and Umbereen Inayet with choreography by Tanisha Scott featured 40 dancers on the shores of Lake Ontario; An augmented reality version of Shakespeare's Henry V, Henry G20, retold the conflict between police and protesters during the June 2010 G20 Summit in Toronto
14th	June 11–13, 2020	The 2020 festival, originally scheduled from June 11–28, was cancelled, but later moved entirely online due to COVID-19 restrictions; Alex Bulmer performed an online version of May I Take Your Arm; R. Murray Schafer restaged 2015's Apocalypsis; Unit 2, Black Lives Matter Toronto and Tea Base performed Black Summers Night in support of the Regis Korchinski-Paquet GoFundMe campaign
13th	June 7–23, 2019	
12th	June 6–24, 2018	International Human Rights Lawyer and Activist Amal Clooney made her first visit to Toronto for an evening of conversation with her father-in-law, veteran journalist, Nick Clooney. The sold-out event, Amal Clooney in Conversation with Nick Clooney was co-presented by Luminato and the Economic Club of Canada. Sophie Grégoire Trudeau gave opening remarks.; Icelandic musician Ólafur Arnalds plays a sold-out show at Elgin Theatre; Hundred of Torontonians from all walks of life took over Nathan Phillips Square to perform Le Grand Continental®; World premiere of the original Luminato commission Dreaming of Lions choreographed by Osnel Delgado and performed by Cuba's Malpaso Dance Company; Luminato launches Illuminating works, a program that gives presenters from Canada and around the world a chance to see work by a varied and exciting line-up of Canadian artist and companies programmed by the festival. In its first year, 25 Artistic Directors and collaborators from 17 cities around the world attended Illuminating works.
11th	June 14–25, 2017	Artistic Director Josephine Ridge programs her first festival, bringing The Famous Spiegeltent toToronto for the first time and using it as a 'festival hub'; Luminato presents three world, two North American and five Canadian premieres; Three Luminato 2017 presentations are nominated for Dora Mavor Moore Awards, two win: WINNER: Until the Lions, an Akram Khan Production – 'Best Production – Dance Division'; WINNER: En avant, marche!, an NTGent and les Ballets C de la B production in collaboration with VLAMO – 'Outstanding Touring Production'; Bearing, a Signal Theatre Production – 'Outstanding Touring Production'
10th	June 10–19, 2016	Luminato takes over Toronto's decommissioned Hearn Generating Station as the main festival venue; The National Theatre of Scotland's trilogy The James Plays; Unsound Toronto returns to the Hearn; Rimini Protokoll's award-winning Situation Rooms; monumental from Holy Body Tattoo and Godspeed You! Black Emperor; Rufus Wainwright recreates Judy Garland's 1961 Carnegie Hall show; Choir! Choir! Choir! and Rufus Wainwright perform Hallelujah: the recording has 5.5 million view on YouTube; The Dream Wanderer exhibition
9th	June 19–28, 2015	Ontario premiere of Mariano Pensotti's El pasado es un animal grotesco; Canadian premiere of Unsound Festival, an electronic music event; World premiere of Contemporary Color, a pep rally pop music mashup conceived by David Byrne; Canadian premiere of Malpaso Dance Company from Cuba; World premiere of Blast Theory's My One Demand, an interactive film; R. Murray Schafer's Apocalypsis, performed in full for the first time since its world premiere in 1980
8th	June 6–15, 2014	Toronto premiere of choreographer Pina Bausch's dance piece Kontakthof; Canadian premiere of groundbreaking contemporary artist Matthew Barney's River of Fundament; World Premiere of If I Loved You: Gentlemen Prefer Broadway, a show conceived and directed by American-Canadian singer-songwriter Rufus Wainwright If I Loved You: Gentlemen Prefer Broadway was also a Toronto WorldPride Major Partner Event, marking Luminato Festival's reputation for collaboration with other significant cultural celebrations and Festivals across the city.
7th	June 14–23, 2013	North American premiere of The Life and Death of Marina Abramović, a biography of the "godmother of performance art," Marina Abramović, re-imagined by director Robert Wilson, at the St. Lawrence Centre for the Arts Bluma Appel Theatre.
6th	June 8–17, 2012	14 commissioned and co-commissioned new works, eight premieres, and over 270 events at 25 theatres, museums, parks and public spaces throughout Toronto; 1093 participating artists, representing 20 different countries, including six Canadian provinces.
5th	June 10–19, 2011	400 mostly free events at 29 venues across Toronto; Almost 1 million Festival-goers; 750 Canadian and international artists from 28 countries
4th	June 11–20, 2010	Nine new commissioned and co-commissioned works; North American premiere of Rufus Wainwright's Prima Donna; World premiere of Volcano Theatre's The Africa Trilogy; Five world premieres, four North American premieres, and one Canadian premiere; North American debut of Syria's acclaimed dance company, Enana Dance Theatre; 36 venues across the city, featuring artists representing 30 countries
3rd	June 5–14, 2009	Randy Bachman at Yonge-Dundas Square as part of the Luminato First Night event; Performances by Goran Bregovic, a Brazilian Guitar Marathon and a tribute to Neil Young featuring the Cowboy Junkies; Holly Cole; Danny Michel; Steven Page; Carole Pope; Bill Frisell Trio; Issa (formerly Jane Siberry); Colin Linden; Stevie Jackson (Belle & Sebastian); Harry Manx; Jason Collett; Sarah Slean and musical director Kevin Breit; North American Premiere of Robert Lepage's nine-hour epic Lipsynch, which weaves together the stories of nine interconnected lives over the span of 70 years; Canadian premiere of author Neil Gaiman's latest novel, The Graveyard Book at the Jane Mallett Theatre, moderated by Mark Askwith (Producer at CTV's SPACE); RedBall Project by artist Kurt Perschke. The 15-foot inflatable ball was placed in a new location each day of the festival.
2nd	June 6–15, 2008	1,400 local artists, 40 international arts managers and producers; Attendance at ticketed events rose 11% from the first year's attendance numbers.; Four world premiere events, and seven Canadian premiere events celebrating diversity and art; Black Watch, The National Theatre of Scotland's theatrical piece by playwright Gregory Burke; Director Tim Supple's international version of Shakespeare's A Midsummer Night's Dream presented by a company of 23 Indian and Sri Lankan dancers, street acrobats, martial arts experts, musicians and actors, performed in seven languages; English, Tamil, Malayalam, Sinhalese, Hindi, Bengali, Marathi, and Sanskrit.; Mikel Rouse's epic opera trilogy for the first time in repertory. The multi-media musical trilogy includes The End of Cinematics, a live video collage. In high contrast are Rouse's solo show Failing Kansas, a multi-media opera directly inspired by Truman Capote's In Cold Blood, and his talk show opera, Dennis Cleveland, a fusion of pop, rock and rhythmic structures.
1st	June 1–10, 2007	1,300 local and 214 international artists, over 30 venues across the downtown Toronto core.; Over 1,035,000 attendees; 10 world premiere events, including 6 commissioned or co-commissioned works: Book of Longing, VIDA!, Norman, Not the Messiah (He's a Very Naughty Boy), Pulse Front, and Auroras/Testimony.; Book of Longing, a music theatre piece using Leonard Cohen's poetry set to music by Philip Glass; Not the Messiah (He's a Very Naughty Boy), the comedic oratorio commissioned by Luminato, and written by Eric Idle & collaborator John Du Prez; Pulse Front: Relational Architecture 12, a light installation produced by Mexican-Canadian artist Rafael Lozano-Hemmer situated at Toronto's harbourfront. The installation was dependent on audience participation, with 20 onsite handlebars linked to computers that transmitted the heart beats of those who touched them to one of 20 searchlights streaming above Harbourfront Centre, Toronto.

== Funding ==
Luminato receives funding from sponsors, private donors, ticket sales, and various government agencies. In 2005, the Ontario Government committed $1 million in funding, which moved the project forward for the first festival. In 2008, the Ontario Government announced a series of strategic investments in the province's cultural industry. As part of that initiative, Luminato received $15 million, which was internally restricted by the board of directors towards commissioning future projects and securing first-performance rights from Canadian and international artists.

In 2007, L'Oréal was announced as Luminato's "exclusive presenting partner." This partnership has since been presented under the banner "Luminato /L'Oréal: Partners in Creativity."
