= Christine Hrenya =

American chemical engineer

Christine M. Hrenya
- Occupations: chemical engineer, applied mathematician

Christine M. Hrenya is an American chemical engineer and applied mathematician whose research involves computational fluid dynamics, especially of aerosols, multiphase flow, and fluidization of granular materials. She is a professor of chemical and biological engineering at the University of Colorado.

== Education and career ==
Hrenya graduated summa cum laude in 1991 from the Ohio State University, majoring in chemical engineering, and completed her Ph.D. in chemical engineering in 1995 at Carnegie Mellon University under the supervision of Jennifer Sinclair Curtis.

She joined the University of Colorado as an assistant professor of chemical and biological engineering in 1998, added an affiliation with the department of applied mathematics in 2003, earned tenure there as an associate professor in 2005, and was promoted to full professor in 2011.

== Recognition ==
Hrenya won the inaugural best dissertation award of the American Institute of Chemical Engineers (AIChE) Particle Technology Forum (PTF), and is a winner of the PTF PSRI Lectureship Award in Fluidization and the PTF Service Award. She is the 2020 winner of the AIChE Shell Thomas Baron Award in Fluid-Particle Systems.

In 2021, Hrenya was named a Fellow of the American Physical Society (APS), after a nomination from the APS Division of Fluid Dynamics, "for key advancements in the fundamental understanding of granular matter and multiphase systems via a combination of theory, experiments, and simulations."

== Publications ==
Hreyna has written over 200 articles and research papers. Her works have been cited over 4500 times according to Google Scholar.

=== Selected publications ===
- Hrenya, Christine M.; Sinclair, Jennifer L. (1997). "Effects of particle-phase turbulence in gas-solid flows". AIChE Journal. 43 (4): 853–869. doi:10.1002/aic.690430402. ISSN 1547-5905
- Stevens, A. B.; Hrenya, C. M. (6 July 2005). "Comparison of soft-sphere models to measurements of collision properties during normal impacts". Powder Technology. 154 (2): 99–109.doi:10.1016/j.powtec.2005.04.033.ISSN 0032-5910
