= Minor arc =

A minor arc may refer to:

- An arc that is smaller than a semicircle
- A term that arises in connection with the Hardy–Littlewood circle method
