= Kate Kitagawa =

Kate Kitagawa (Dr. Tomoko L. Kitagawa) is an author of multiple books in Japanese and English including a national bestseller (2012) in Japan. She co-authored The Secret Lives of Numbers in 2023, a highly acclaimed work on the history of mathematics. The book was shortlisted for the 2024 British Academy Book Prize.

She received her Ph.D. from Princeton University in 2009 and taught history at Harvard University from 2009 to 2012. She moved to England in 2012 and conducted her research at the Needham Research Institute, the Isaac Newton Institute for Mathematical Sciences, and Wolfson College Cambridge.

She worked as the Director of the Space Education Office (Space Education Center) at the Japan Aerospace Exploration Agency (JAXA).

Kitagawa is currently a professor of Practice in Space Research and Education at La Trobe University. She also serves as Program Lead for Space Biology at the La Trobe Institute for Molecular Science in Melbourne, Australia.
