= Representability =

Representability in mathematics can refer to

- representable functors in category theory
- representable matroids in matroid theory
- Birch's theorem about the representability of zero by odd degree forms
- Brauer's theorem on the representability of zero by forms over certain fields in sufficiently many variables
- Brown's representability theorem in homotopy theory

== See also ==
- Representation theorem
- Representation theory
