= John Toland (disambiguation) =

John Toland (1670–1722) was an Enlightenment philosopher.

John Toland may also refer to:

- John Toland (historian) (1912–2004), American author and historian
- John Toland (wrestler) or Tank Toland (born 1979), American wrestler
- John Toland (mathematician), mathematician active in analysis and partial differential equations

== See also ==
- John Tolan (disambiguation)
