= Barry Supple =

British historian (born 1930)

Barry Emanuel Supple, CBE, FBA (born 27 October 1930, Hackney, London), is Emeritus Professor of Economic History, University of Cambridge, and a former director of the Leverhulme Trust. He is the father of theatre and opera director Tim Supple.

== Education ==
- Hackney Downs School (where he was a contemporary of Harold Pinter)
- London School of Economics (Honorary Fellow, 2001)
- Christ's College, Cambridge

== Career ==
- Assistant Professor of Business History, Harvard University, 1955–1960
- Associate Prof. of Economic History, McGill University, 1960–1962
- University of Sussex: Lecturer, Reader, then Professor of Economic and Social History, 1962–1978; Dean, School of Social Sciences, 1965–1968; Pro-Vice-Chancellor (Arts and Social Studies), 1968–1972; Pro-Vice-Chancellor, 1978
- University of Oxford: Reader in Recent Social and Economic History, 1978–1981; Professorial Fellow, Nuffield College, Oxford, 1978–1981
- Professorial Fellow, 1981–1983, Honorary Fellow, 1984, Christ's College, Cambridge
- Master of St. Catharine's College, Cambridge, 1984-1993 (Honorary Fellow, 1993)
- Director, Leverhulme Trust, 1993–2001

== Honours and other positions ==
- Honorary Fellow, Worcester College, Oxford 1986
- Associate Fellow, Trumbull College, Yale University, 1986
- Chairman, Consultative Committee of Assessment of Performance Unit, Department of Education and Science, 1975–1980
- President, Economic History Society, 1992–1995
- Fellow of the British Academy, 1987; Foreign Secretary, 1995–1999
- CBE, 2000

== Selected bibliography ==
- Supple, Barry. Doors Open. Cambridge, UK: Asher, 2008. ISBN 0-9560057-0-5 (Autobiography; described in The Clove's Lines 3.2 [March 2009]: 13.)
- Supple, Barry. "Harold Pinter – Some Memories." The Clove's Lines: The Newsletter of The Clove Club: The Old Boys of Hackney Downs School 3.2 (March 2009): 6–7. Print.

== Notes ==
Academic offices
Preceded by Peter Swinnerton-Dyer	Master of St Catharine's College, Cambridge; 1984-1993	Succeeded by Terence English
