= Jennifer Sinclair Curtis =

American engineer

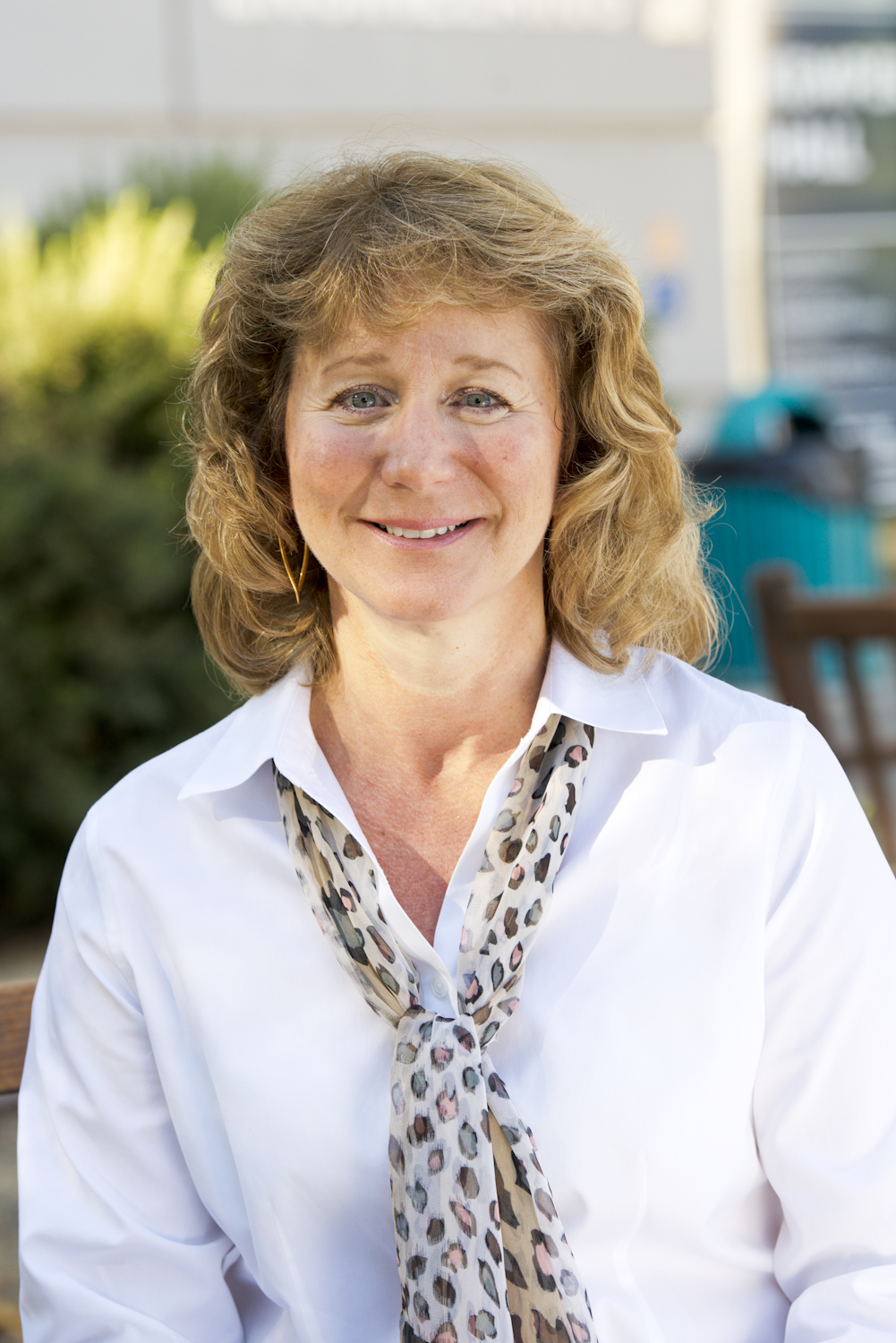
- Curtis in 2015
- Born: Jennifer Lynn Doloresco; December 25, 1960 (age 65); Cincinnati, Ohio, USA
- Spouse(s): Barry Allan Curtis (m. 2002) Gavin Sinclair (m. 1981; died 2000)

Academic background
- Education: BSChE, chemical engineering, Purdue University; MSChE, PhD, Princeton University, Princeton University
- Thesis: Vertical transport of gas and solids with radial solid density variations (1989)
- Doctoral advisor: Roy Jackson

Jennifer Lynn Sinclair Curtis (nee Doloresco; born December 25, 1960) is an American engineer. She was the Dean of the University of California, Davis' College of Engineering from 2015 until 2020 and a Fellow of the American Association for the Advancement of Science, American Institute of Chemical Engineers, American Society for Engineering Education, and American Physical Society.

== Early life and education ==
She was born as Jennifer Lynn Doloresco to parents Carolyn Doloresco and Jerry Doloresco on December 25, 1960, in Cincinnati. While attending Northwest High School in 1978, she was encouraged to pursue a career in engineering by her high school counselor. As a result, Doloresco completed her undergraduate work in chemical engineering at Purdue University and earned her PhD in the same field at Princeton University. During her freshman year at Purdue, she met Gavin Sinclair and they married in 1981. As a sophomore, Sinclair spent a summer working in the "Folgers" Group at Procter & Gamble in Cincinnati.

== Career ==
Sinclair and her husband started their academic careers at Carnegie Mellon University. During her tenure, she developed new courses and was described as "the strongest and most popular teacher in the department." In 1997, the couple accepted tenured positions at her alma mater, Purdue. Following her husband's death in 2000, Sinclair was promoted to Full professor and named the associate dean of the College of Engineering with Chemical Engineering Education responsibility for Undergraduate Education, while continuing her duties as head of Freshman Engineering. She remained at Purdue and married Barry Allan Curtis, an associate director for the consulting firm CAP Gemini Erns & Young, in 2002.

In 2002, while serving as head of the Department of Freshman Engineering and a professor of chemical engineering, Sinclair Curtis was named associate dean for undergraduate education. She is credited with models of particulate flow that have been adopted extensively in commercial and open-source computational fluid dynamics software code. She also was the first to partner with ANSYS Fluent to expand the multi-phase simulation capability of that code. A few years later, she left Purdue to become the chair of the Department of Chemical Engineering at the University of Florida.

=== University of Florida ===
Sinclair Curtis left Purdue University in 2003 to accept a faculty appointment at the University of Florida. During her tenure at the institution, she accepted a Fulbright Senior Research Scholarship from 2010 to 2011, and elected a Fellow of the American Institute of Chemical Engineers and American Society for Engineering Education. During the 2008 academic year, Sinclair Curtis received the ChE Lectureship Award presented by the American Society for Engineering Education Chemical Engineering Division. In 2012, Sinclair Curtis was elected a Fellow of the American Association for the Advancement of Science for "seminal contributions to the understanding of particle flow and the dynamics of gas-solid flows."

=== University of California, Davis ===
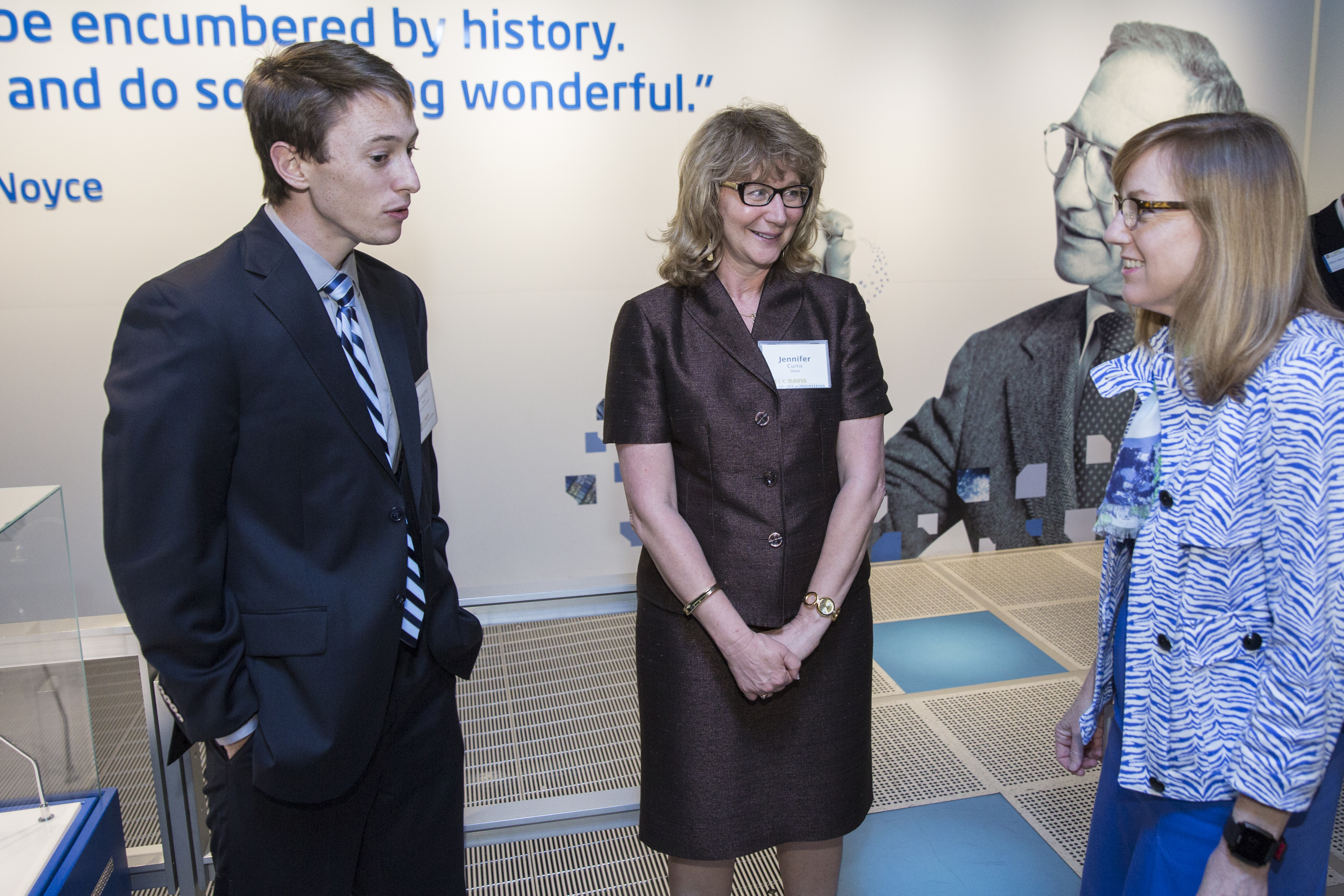
Curtis (middle) at the headquarters of Intel in Santa Clara in May 2016

Sinclair Curtis left the University of Florida in 2015 to become the first woman Dean of the College of Engineering at the University of California, Davis (UC Davis). In the same year, she was also the recipient of the American Institute of Chemical Engineers’ F.J. & Dorothy Van Antwerpen Award, which recognizes "outstanding technical and professional contributions to the field of chemical engineering." During her tenure as Dean, Sinclair Curtis received the 2019 Lifetime Achievement Award from American Institute of Chemical Engineers.

During the COVID-19 pandemic, Sinclair Curtis announced her decision to step down as College of Engineering Dean prior to her second term. She continued to teach as a distinguished professor of chemical engineering and was the recipient of the American Society for Engineering Education's national Benjamin G. Lamme Award "to celebrate excellence in engineering education and administration." In October, Sinclair Curtis was elected a Fellow of the American Physical Society upon the recommendation of the APS Division of Fluid Dynamics.
