= John Tolan =

John Tolan may refer to:

- John H. Tolan (1877–1947), American politician
- Johnnie Tolan (1917–1986), American racecar driver
- John V. Tolan (born 1959), American historian

== See also ==
- John Toland (disambiguation)
