= List of honorary fellows of St Catharine's College, Cambridge =

- Dame Maggie Aderin-Pocock
- David Armitage
- Sir John Baker
- Sir Peter Barnes
- Sir Jonathan Bate
- Sir Alan Battersby
- Charles Benstead
- Arnoldus Schytte Blix
- Mark Bonney
- Asa Briggs, Baron Briggs
- Sir Graeme Davies
- Sir Terence English
- Kai T. Erikson
- Rona Fairhead
- Sir Richard Gardner
- Simon Gaunt
- Jenni Gibbons
- Sir Peter Hall
- Sir David Harding
- Roger Harrabin
- Joanne Harris
- John Anthony Harvey
- Nigel Hess
- Charles Higham
- Sir Peter Hirsch
- John Hooper
- Sir Mark Horner
- David Ingram
- David Isaac
- Sir Emyr Jones Parry
- Malcolm Martineau
- Sir Harvey McGrath
- Sir Ian McKellen
- Yuri Oganessian
- Sir Geoffrey Pattie
- Jeremy Paxman
- Sir Michael Peckham
- Sir Nicholas Penny
- John Shelton Reed
- Robert Saxton
- Helen Small
- Richard Smethurst
- Sarah Springman
- Barry Supple
- Sir Peter Swinnerton-Dyer
- Dame Jean Thomas
- Daniella Tilbury
- James Wright
