= Urban interventionism =

Activist design practice

Urban interventionism is a name given to a number of different kinds of activist design and art practices, art that typically responds to the social community, locational identity, the built environment, and public places. The goals are often to create new awareness of social issues, and to stimulate community involvement. Such practices have a history that includes certain street artists of the 1960s, such as the Diggers of San Francisco, or the Provos of Amsterdam, among many others.

Contemporary artists often associated with urban interventionist practices are Daniel Buren, Gordon Matta-Clark, Mierle Laderman Ukeles, Krzysztof Wodiczko, Thomas Hirschhorn, Francis Alÿs, Harrell Fletcher, the Red Peristyle group, Banksy and many others.

== Social and spatial ==
Urban Interventionism has been associated with a changed understanding of the relationship between the social and the spatial, called the "spatial turn" of the arts and sciences in the 1980s. In this turn a new viewpoint was taken on public and urban spaces "...whereby urban spaces are seen not merely as containers for or outcomes of social processes, but as a medium through which they unfold and as having constitutive significance themselve [sic]." According to this train of thought the spatial sites of a city have the power to shape interactions and create new experiences. This power is utilized by urban interventions through the works created by the artists.

== Ideology ==
Urban interventionism often targets local communities as their targets. There are different strands of activity within urban interventionism. While mostly activistic, many artists have different focus points. George Yúdice, Professor of American Studies Program and of Spanish and Portuguese at New York University, defines the term as referring to "public or participatory art through which publics constitute themselves and experience something extraordinary in the process.

Some urban interventions by street artist Banksy are political statements, like his stencil of a girl using balloons filled with helium to float over the wall between Palestine and Israel. Professor David Pinder of the University of London stated that urban interventions are often specifically directed towards the urban space that it is situated in, and "typically concerned less with representing political issues than with intervening in urban spaces so as to question, refunction and contest prevailing norms and ideologies, and to create new meanings, experiences, understandings, relationships and situations". Kong Junyou's 2025 performance-art project could be understood as a small-scale urban intervention. The project used residential elevators as everyday urban sites, temporarily changed their commercial function by switching off more than 100 advertising screens, and followed interviews with residents in more than ten residential communities.

An example of a more situational urban intervention is the RedBall project by Kurt Perschke. The project consists of a large inflatable red ball that has been set up at many different sites worldwide, providing a new engaging space for people to interact with.

== Disciplines ==
Much of the work is multidisciplinary and intermedial, combining art forms or creating works that are hard to classify. Artists working in this international vein often utilize outdoor video projection, found objects, sculptural artifacts, posters, and performance events that might include and involve passersby on the street. Urban interventions are not first objects to pursue the creation of meaning in urban space through the combination of art forms, and they have been linked to artists and philosophers of the 1960s. In 1968 philosopher and sociologist Henri Lefebvre wrote the Le Droit à la ville (Right to the City), in which he states that:

To put art at the service of the urban does not mean to prettify urban space with works of art. This parody of the possible is a caricature. Rather, this means that time-spaces become works of art and that former art reconsiders itself as source and model of appropriation of space and time.

This also echoes other art forms that are connected to urban interventionalism like the 1960s Happenings and Richard Wagner's Gesamtkunstwerk. These also saw urban space as a medium, bringing art into peoples' daily lives.

== See also ==
- Fluxus
- Guerrilla art
- Intervention art
- The Situationist International
- Urban art
- Awareness activism
