= Miles Reid =

Mathematician researching algebraic geometry

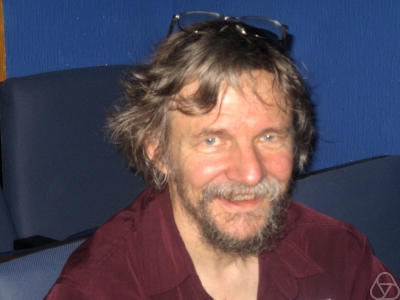
- Born: Miles Anthony Reid; 30 January 1948 (age 78); Hoddesdon, England
- Education: University of Cambridge
- Awards: Fellow of the Royal Society (2002) Berwick Prize (2006) Pólya Prize (2014) Sylvester Medal (2023)
- Scientific career
- Fields: Mathematics
- Workplaces: Christ's College, Cambridge; University of Warwick
- Thesis: The Complete Intersection of Two or More Quadratics (1972)
- Doctoral advisor: Peter Swinnerton-Dyer; Pierre Deligne
- Doctoral students: Nicholas Shepherd-Barron
- Website: mreid.warwick.ac.uk

Miles Anthony Reid FRS (born 30 January 1948) is a mathematician who works in algebraic geometry.

== Education ==
Reid studied the Cambridge Mathematical Tripos at Trinity College, Cambridge and obtained his Ph.D. in 1973 under the supervision of Peter Swinnerton-Dyer and Pierre Deligne.

== Career ==
Reid was a research fellow of Christ's College, Cambridge from 1973 to 1978. He became a lecturer at the University of Warwick in 1978 and was appointed professor there in 1992. He has written two well known books: Undergraduate Algebraic Geometry and Undergraduate Commutative Algebra.

== Awards and honours ==
Reid was elected a Fellow of the Royal Society in 2002. In the same year, he participated as an Invited Speaker in the International Congress of Mathematicians in Beijing. Reid was awarded the Senior Berwick Prize in 2006 for his paper with Alessio Corti and Aleksandr Pukhlikov, "Fano 3-fold hypersurfaces", which made a big advance in the study of 3-dimensional algebraic varieties. In 2023 he was awarded the Sylvester Medal of the Royal Society.

== Personal life ==
Reid speaks Japanese and Russian and has given lectures in Japanese.

== Bibliography ==
His most famous book is

- Undergraduate Algebraic Geometry, Cambridge University Press 1988 (ISBN 978-0521356626) doi:10.1017/CBO9781139163699

Other books

- Undergraduate Commutative Algebra, Cambridge University Press 1995, doi:10.1017/CBO9781139172721
- with Balazs Szendroi: Geometry and Topology, Cambridge University Press 2007

His most famous translation is the two volume work by Shafarevich

- Basic Algebraic Geometry 1, Springer 1972 (ISBN 978-3642379550)
- Basic Algebraic Geometry 2, Springer 1977 (ISBN 978-3642380099)

And he has also translated Matsumura's

- Commutative Ring Theory, Cambridge University Press 1987, doi:10.1017/CBO9781139171762
