= David Crighton Medal =

English biennial mathematics award

The David Crighton Medal is a biennial prize established in 2002 by the Institute of Mathematics and its Applications (IMA) and the London Mathematical Society (LMS) for "services both to mathematics and to the mathematical community". The holders are usually fellows of both the IMA and LMS.

The award is issued on odd-numbered years, with its partner IMA-LMS prize, the Christopher Zeeman Medal, issued on even-numbered years.

== Rationale ==
The medal was first awarded in 2003 and was established in memory of David Crighton FRS (1942–2000) "for services both to mathematics and to the mathematical community".

== Prize holders list ==
Source: Institute of Mathematics and its Applications

- 2003 Sir John Ball, FRS
- 2006 Sir Christopher Zeeman, FRS
- 2009 Keith Moffatt, FRS
- 2012 Arieh Iserles and Peter M. Neumann, OBE
- 2015 Frank Kelly, FRS CBE
- 2017 I. David Abrahams
- 2019 Ken Brown, FRSE CBE
- 2021 Caroline Series, FRS
- 2023 Alison Etheridge, FRS OBE
- 2025 Alain Goriely, FRS

== See also ==
- List of mathematics awards
