= Birch–Tate conjecture =

Mathematical conjecture

In mathematics, specifically in algebraic K-theory, the Birch–Tate conjecture is a conjecture proposed by Bryan John Birch and John Tate relating the $K_2$ group of a field to its Dedekind zeta function.

== Statement ==
Formally, the group $K_2$ of a number field $F$ is defined as the center of the Steinberg group of the ring of integers of $F$. $K_2$ is also known as the tame kernel of $F$. The Birch–Tate conjecture relates the order of this group (its number of elements) to the value of the Dedekind zeta function $\zeta_F$.

More specifically, let $F$ be a totally real number field and let $N$ be the largest positive integer such that the extension of $F$ by the $N$-th root of unity has an elementary abelian 2-group as its Galois group. Then the conjecture states that

$$\#K_2 = |N\cdot\zeta_F(-1)|.$$

== Status ==
Progress on this conjecture has been made as a consequence of work on Iwasawa theory, and in particular of the proofs given for the so-called "main conjecture of Iwasawa theory."
