= If I Loved You: Gentlemen Prefer Broadway =

2014 concert in Toronto, Ontario, Canada

- Festival concert by Rufus Wainwright
- Promotional artwork for the program
- Venue: Sony Centre for the Performing Arts
- Date: June 14, 2014

If I Loved You: Gentlemen Prefer Broadway — An Evening of Love Duets is a show conceived and directed by American-Canadian singer-songwriter Rufus Wainwright, which premiered on June 14, 2014 during Luminato in Toronto, Ontario, Canada. The concert featured men singing classic love songs to one another, and included a full orchestra and performances by Wainwright and special guests Boy George, David Byrne, Josh Groban and Steven Page. Countertenor Brennan Hall, Brent Carver, Glen Hansard, Ezra Koenig and Andrew Rannells also appeared. The program featured songs written by gay men, including Noël Coward, Lorenz Hart, Jerry Herman and Cole Porter.

== Background and development ==
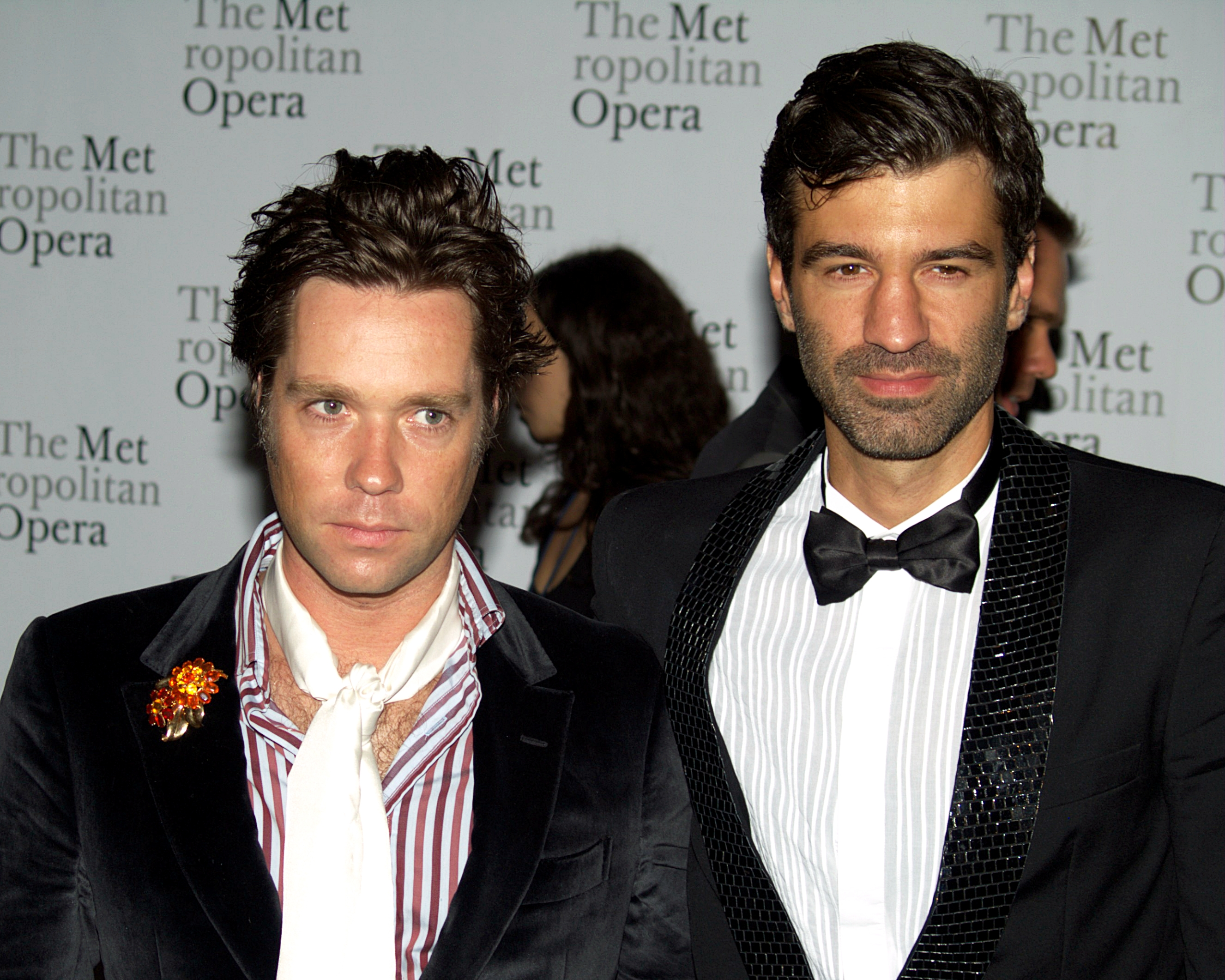
Rufus Wainwright and his husband Jörn Weisbrodt, who also serves as artistic director of Luminato, in 2010.

In 2012, having been together for seven years, Wainwright married Jörn Weisbrodt, who became artistic director of Luminato in 2011. Wainwright began appearing at Luminato in 2010, when he performed in support of his album All Days Are Nights: Songs for Lulu (2010) and presented the North American premiere of his first opera, Prima Donna (2009). Since then, Wainwright has performed at Luminato regularly. In 2012, he and his sister Martha Wainwright paid tribute to their mother (Kate McGarrigle), who died in 2010, with a program called Love Over and Over.

In 2014, Weisbrodt said of his association with both Luminato and Wainwright, "I think the primary purpose of my job is to love artists. Of course the relationship with my husband Rufus Wainwright is special but I feel if someone is more talented and deserves more to be associated with this festival it is him rather than me." For the 2014 festival, Wainwright conceived, created and directed a program called If I Loved You: Gentlemen Prefer Broadway, which will feature "guys singing classic love songs to other guys".

== Description and promotion ==
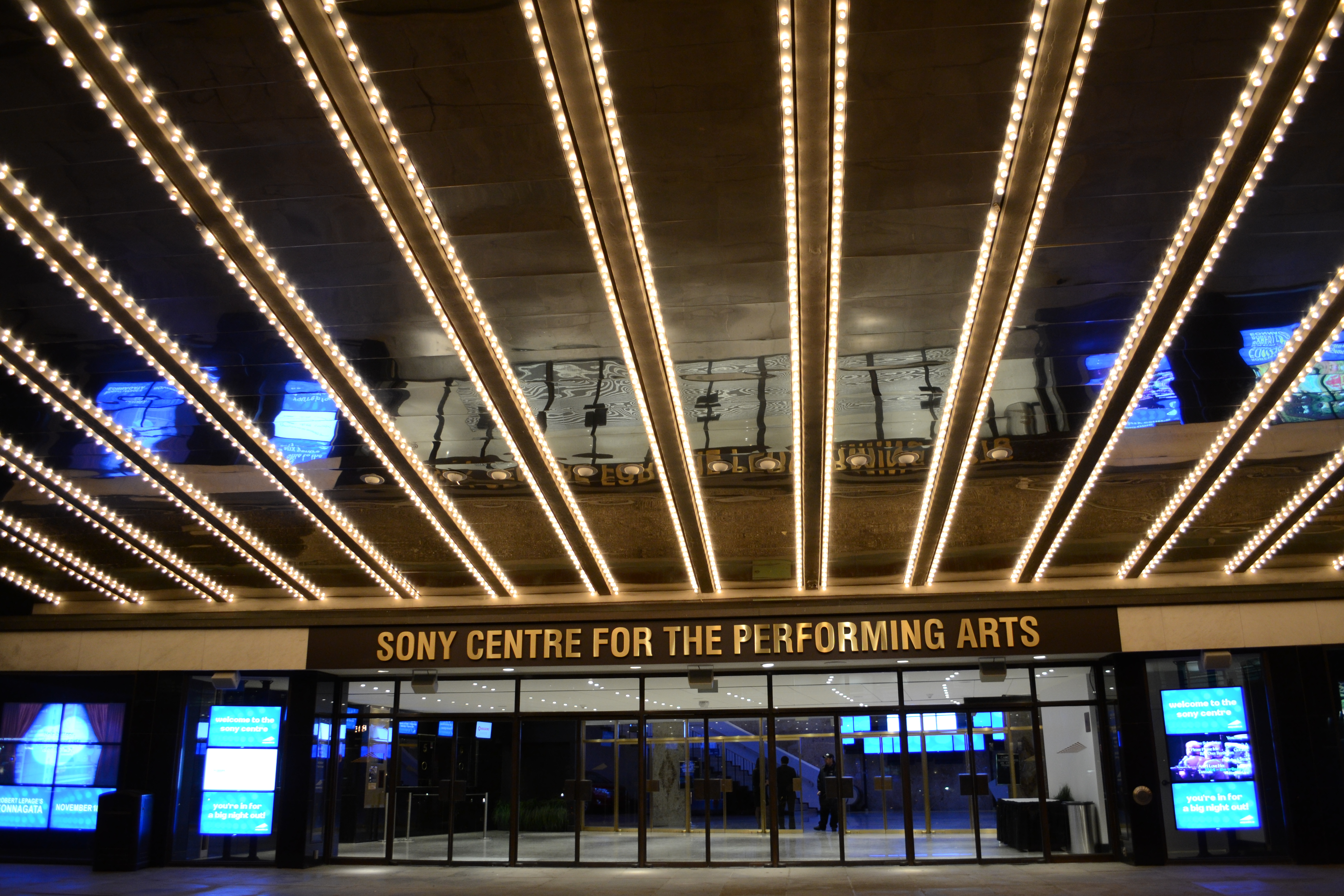
Toronto's Sony Centre for the Performing Arts in 2010

The Canadian Broadcasting Corporation described the program as "male singers putting a new spin on dozens of love songs traditionally performed by a man and a woman, or by a man singing about a woman". It premiered on June 14, 2014 at the Sony Centre for the Performing Arts, during Luminato's closing weekend, and was billed as a "prelude" to Toronto's WorldPride event, which took place during June 20–29 and replaced annual Pride Week events for the year. WorldPride also served as a concert partner.

The concert was officially confirmed on April 8, 2014 by Weisbrodt during a news conference about the festival. Wainwright and Weisbrodt had previously announced the show during an exclusive party they hosted. In promoting the concert, Weisbrodt said:

What Rufus has put together for this evening of celebrating love is simply mind- boggling and something I would not have been able to pull off as the artistic director by myself. It promises to be one of the most unusual nights of music. Who doesn't want to hear these artists sing together? If I Loved You is not about turning something from "straight" to "gay," by singing love duets with only men, but instead, to declare the universality of love, and to celebrate love that comes in every shade.

Luminato promoted the event with the following description:

Rufus Wainwright teams with Grammy and Tony-winning music director Stephen Oremus to redefine dozens of the most beloved gems in the Great American Songbook, all love songs from Broadway musicals. Wainwright’s recontextualizations, performed exclusively by men and to men, fortify the songs’ universality as expressions of love. The groundbreaking evening will showcase Wainwright and an international spectrum of pop, jazz and musical theatre stars in unexpected, entirely enchanting pairs.

In a press release also issued on April 8, a spokesperson for WorldPride said, "You can never underestimate the power of seeing yourself reflected in art, and how important that is to a feeling of belonging. WorldPride 2014 Toronto will showcase a rich range of LGBTQ art and voices from across the world in a once-in-a-lifetime event. We are delighted to partner with a cultural icon like the Luminato Festival to celebrate Toronto’s vibrant arts community and bring focus on global LGBTQ struggles and triumphs." Tickets went on sale the week of news conference. Boy George's participation was confirmed on his official website, which also noted that the concert would take place on his birthday.

== Program ==
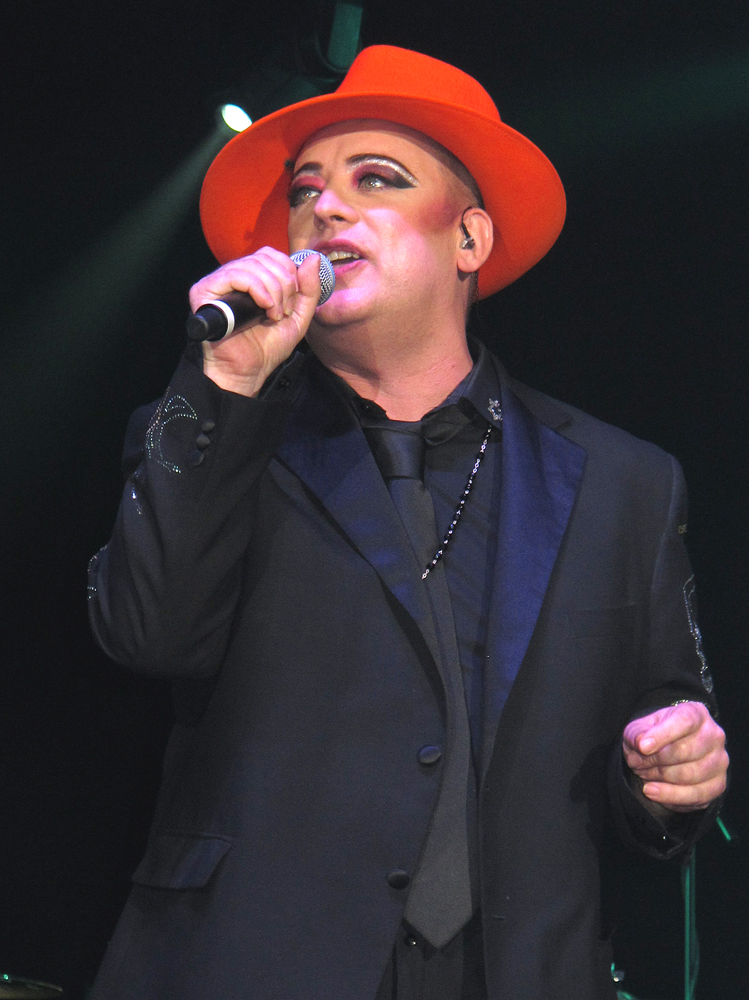
Boy George

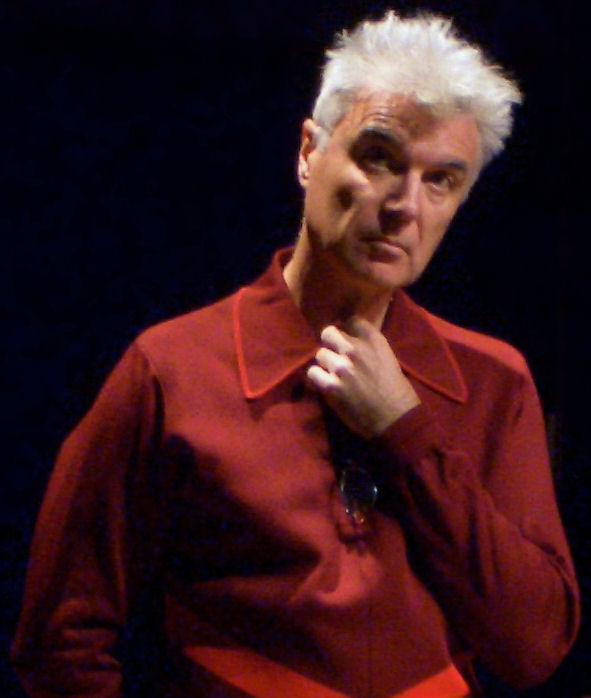
David Byrne

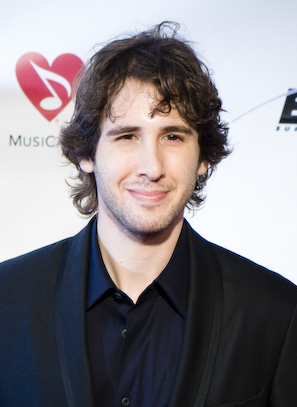
Josh Groban

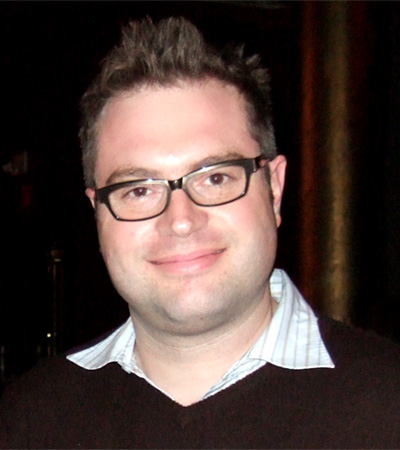
Steven Page

The show included a full Broadway orchestra, conducted by music director Stephen Oremus, and performances by Wainwright and special guests Boy George, David Byrne, Josh Groban and Steven Page. Also scheduled to appear are counter-tenor Brennan Hall, Brent Carver, Glen Hansard, Ezra Koenig and Andrew Rannells. Some of the songs were written by gay men, including Noël Coward, Lorenz Hart, Jerry Herman and Cole Porter.

Included were the songs "If I Loved You" from Carousel (1945), "Some Enchanted Evening" from South Pacific (1949), and "We Kiss in a Shadow" from The King and I (1951), all written by Rodgers and Hammerstein, as well as songs by Stephen Sondheim.

== Reception ==
Prior to the concert, the Toronto Star said, "One thing we can be sure of is that, to borrow a phrase from one famous song, this could be the start of something big... After its Toronto premiere, it’s safe to assume If I Loved You will head for New York, the Hollywood Bowl and London". The paper's entertainment contributor Martin Knelman predicted that the concert would sell out "in record time".
