= The Dream Wanderer =

Mobile virtual-reality art project

The Dream Wanderer is a mobile virtual reality art project by virtual reality artist Flatsitter. This retrofitted transit shuttle / virtual reality art gallery completed a tour across North America in 2017.

== Tour ==
While touring across North America, the bus stopped at various locations including:

- Moogfest in Durham, North Carolina
- Luminato Festival in Toronto, Ontario
- Pump Project in Austin, Texas
- Convivio in Oaxaca, México
- Satellite Art Show in Miami Beach, FL

Now that the tour has completed, the bus awaits its next journey.
