= Tim Supple =

British born theatre director

Timothy Supple (born 24 September 1962) is a British born, award-winning international theatre director. He is the son of the academic Barry Supple.

== Career ==
Supple was educated at Lewes Priory Comprehensive School, Gosford Hill School and Churchill College, Cambridge, where he read History and English. He has directed and adapted theatre in London and the UK as well as across the world in a wide range of languages - including in Europe, India, North Africa and the near East, Iran, Turkey, China, Japan, South Korea, Australia, Russia and the post Soviet States, and North and South America. In the UK he has worked regularly at the Royal National Theatre and Royal Shakespeare Company and was Artistic Director of the Young Vic from 1993-2000 and founding co-Artistic Director of Dash Arts from 2005-2019, creating theatre with artists internationally. He launched his new company, Supple Productions, in 2020.

== UK Theatre work ==
At the Young Vic he directed A Servant to Two Masters (RSC co-production: national & international tour & West End), As I Lay Dying, Twelfth Night, Blood Wedding, The Jungle Book, Grimm Tales (& international tour), More Grimm Tales (& Broadway), The Slab Boys Trilogy, Oedipus; for the National Theatre: Haroun and the Sea of Stories, The Epic of Gilgamesh, Billy Liar (national tour), Accidental Death of an Anarchist (national tour), Whale, Romeo and Juliet, The Villains Opera; for the RSC: Midnight's Children(Barbican, national tour & Apollo Theatre, New York), Love in a Wood, Tales from Ovid (Young Vic), The Comedy of Errors (national/international tour & Young Vic), Spring Awakening; for Kenneth Branagh's Renaissance Theatre Company: Coriolanus (with Branagh, Judi Dench, Richard Briers and Iain Glenn) and Traveling Tales; The Cosmonauts Last Message... (Donmar Wharehouse); Oh, What a Lovely War!, Guys and Dolls (Haymarket Theatre, Leicester); Billy Budd (Crucible Theatre, Sheffield). As associate director at the Theatre Royal, York, Supple directed work by Kroetz, Arthur Miller, Willy Russell and Brecht.

Supple has worked outside the theatre on several occasions: his Opera includes Hansel and Gretel, The Magic Flute (Opera North); John Browne's Babette's Feast (Linbury Studio, ROH); Il ritorno d'Ulisse in patria (Grange Festival) and his film work includes: Twelfth Night (Projector/Channel 4), Rockabye (IWC/Channel 4). He is the recipient of a NESTA Invention and Innovation Award for experiments in film.

In 2017, Supple created Freedom on the Tyne in collaboration with artists, organisations and citizens of Newcastle-Gateshead. With text by Roy Williams and Katie Ebner-Landy, the unique event took place on Sunday 29 October on the Tyne Bridge and in venues and streets across the city centre. Celebrating the Fiftieth anniversary of Dr Martin Luther King’s visit to Tyneside to receive an honorary degree from Newcastle University, Freedom on the Tyne dramatized epic narratives of historic civil rights battles in USA, India, South Africa and UK and was performed by hundreds of local participants.

Supple's adaptations for the theatre include: Accidental Death of an Anarchist (with Dario Fo & Alan Cumming); Billy Budd (with David Holman); The Epic of Gilgamesh; Grimm Tales and More Grimm Tales (with Carol Ann Duffy); The Jungle Book; Haroun and the Sea of Stories (with Salman Rushdie & David Tushingham); Midnight's Children (with Rushdie & Simon Reade); Tales from Ovid (with Ted Hughes & Simon Reade); Beasts and Beauties (with Duffy & Melly Still); and One Thousand and One Nights (with Hanan Al Shaykh).

== International Theatre work ==
Includes: Beasts and Beauties, Too Clever By Half (Norwegian National Theatre, Bergen); Much Ado About Nothing (Maxim Gorki Theatre, Berlin); The Comedy of Errors (BBT, Istanbul); The Tempest (NCPA, Beijing)

In 2005, he launched Dash Arts with Josephine Burton to create new performance in collaboration with artists from abroad. His work for Dash Arts includes What We Did to Weinstein (Menier Chocolate Factory, 2005), As You Like It (Leicester Curve, 2009) and A Midsummer Night's Dream, commissioned by the British Council and created in India (2006-2008): an international success known widely as The Indian Dream, the production subsequently completed two tours of India, extensive tours of the UK, Australia and North America, two seasons at Stratford-upon-Avon and a season at the Roundhouse in London. The Guardian hailed it as "the most life-enhancing production of Shakespeare's play since Peter Brook's."

In 2008 Supple started work on a new theatrical adaptation of One Thousand and One Nights with the celebrated Lebanese author Hanan al Shaykh. Commissioned by Luminato Festival, Toronto, and produced by Dash Arts, the production was developed over two years of research and rehearsal in North Africa and the Middle East. Created with a cast and creative team drawn from the Arabic speaking world and performed in three languages over six hours, One Thousand and One Nights opened in June 2011 in Toronto and had its European premier at Edinburgh International Festival in August where the Independent hailed it as "an instant classic of engaged storytelling… a rediscovered literary masterpiece".

Research Projects include: Peter Pan, international project on the classic tale researched with London’s Roundhouse in Argentina, Brazil, Cuba, India and China; Shahanmeh, the great Iranian epic with text translated by Dick Davis researched at National Theatre London and in Tehran; 1917, the Soviet and post-Soviet experience researched in Russia and across the post-Soviet States; King Lear – International Theatre Laboratory, launched in 2015, a research and production process investigating the world’s great theatre traditions, so far in Japan, South Korea, Mexico and UK; The Devils Are Not Sleeping , exploring the ancient, historical and political story of European union with text by Katie Ebner-Landy and artists across Europe.

== Awards and nominations ==
Awards: Time Out (Grimm Tales), TMA (A Midsummer Night's Dream), Herald Angel - EIF (One Thousand and One Nights), Dora- Toronto (A Midsummer Night's Dream), Yapi Krede Afifi - Istanbul (Comedy of Errors).

Nominations: Olivier (Accidental Death of an Anarchist), BAFTA (Twelfth Night), Evening Standard (Grimm Tales, A Midsummer Night's Dream).
