= William John Hooper =

- Born: 21 August 1916; Lichfield, Staffordshire, England
- Died: 14 October 1996 (aged 80); Worthing, Sussex, England
- Occupation: Cartoonist
- Known for: Percy Prune (comic character)

William John Hooper aka Bill Hooper (21 August 1916 – 14 October 1996) was a British cartoonist. He is best remembered as the creator of the wartime comic character Percy Prune.

== Early life ==
Hooper was educated at a boarding school in Kent. After school he was sent to work as a laboratory assistant in a Windsor medical clinic. This introduction to science led him to begin a degree in metallurgy at Imperial College, London. However, he dropped out of university after just two terms. Hooper then went to Ireland to work as an armed bodyguard, before eking out a living as a painter.

== Career ==
At the start of World War II he enrolled as an air gunner, but was soon transferred to ground staff. During the war he met Anthony Armstrong, editor of the training manual, Tee Emm, and together they created the character of PO Prune as a way of instructing wartime pilots what not to do if they wanted to save their lives and their aircraft.

In the post-war years, Hooper and Armstrong produced a number of successful books. Hooper worked as political cartoonist for the Sunday Chronicle, and later for the BBC as presenter of the series ‘Willy the Pup’. He also formed a studio of artists to create animations for BBC programmes. He produced a strip cartoon for The Star newspaper before returning to television as, first, an artist and later a presenter. He was also worked for several years as a columnist for the Sunday Pictorial. His wife Noelle died in 1979. His son, John Hooper, is a journalist and author.
