= Awareness activism =

Type of activism

Awareness activism (or awareness-raising activism) is a type of activism which aims at spreading knowledge and drawing public attention to specific social, environmental, or health issues to make people notice them. Awareness activism focuses on visibility and education, unlike advocacy, which goes a step further by actively taking action to achieve concrete policy changes, systemic reforms, or specific solutions.

Although sometimes considered similar to consciousness raising, because both aim to educate, they differ significantly in their depth, methods, and historical roots. Consciousness raising involves deep, collective reflection to help people recognize how personal struggles connect to broader systemic structures. Meanwhile, awareness activism focuses on broadcasting information to inform the public that an issue exists.

There is an ongoing debate about the true nature of awareness-raising activism; for example, it includes performative activism, which often seems more like a trend than a genuine commitment to a cause. But at the same time—and especially among younger people, digital natives accustomed to participating through virtual channels—it is viewed as part of the normal development of today’s young adult political thought.

Some notable examples are:

- breast cancer and other types of cancer,
- autism awareness,
- domestic violence,
- HIV/AIDS,
- disabilities, etc.

A useful tool to create new awareness of social issues is urban interventionism, which stimulates community involvement through activist design and art practices that typically respond to social communities, locational identities, built environments, and public places. Awareness ribbons are a simple and popular means for collectively showing support for a cause, inviting strangers to ask about their meaning. Awareness days, weeks or months are specific dates set aside on the calendar to focus public attention on a particular cause, health condition, social issue, or group of people; they are organized by global bodies, such as the United Nations, charities, governments, and communities, in order to encourage learning and action.

== See also ==
- Activism
- Advocacy
- Artivism
- Craftivism
- Hashtag activism
- Slacktivism
- Urban interventionism
