= John Hooper (journalist) =

British journalist (born 1950)

John Edward Francis Hooper (born 17 July 1950) is a British journalist, author and broadcaster. He is the Italy and Vatican correspondent of The Economist.

== Early life ==
Born in Westminster, London, he is the son of the artist and writer William John ('Bill') Hooper ("Raff") (1916–1996). Hooper was educated at St Benedict's School in London and St Catharine's College, Cambridge. In his first year at university, he travelled to the breakaway state of Biafra to help make a television documentary on the Nigerian Civil War.

== Career ==
After graduating, Hooper worked for the BBC as a current affairs reporter. In 1973, he became Diplomatic Correspondent of the then newly established Independent Radio News. The following year he moved to Cyprus following the Turkish invasion of the island as a freelance correspondent for news organisations including the BBC, The Guardian and The Economist.

In 1976, after the death of Spain's dictator, Francisco Franco, Hooper was asked by The Guardian to become its correspondent in Madrid. Over the next three years, he covered the Spanish transition to democracy. He returned to Madrid as correspondent for The Observer, Guardian and Economist in 1988, remaining until 1994. In the intervening years, he worked on the London staff of The Guardian and from 1984 to 1988 was a presenter of the BBC World Service programme, Twenty Four Hours.

Between 1994 and 1999, Hooper was based in Rome as Southern Europe Correspondent for The Guardian and Observer. He brought to light the so-called ‘Ship of Death’ migrant trafficking disaster of December 25, 1996 and was a member of the award-winning Observer team that investigated its aftermath. Hooper was Central Europe Correspondent for the same two papers, based in Berlin, until 2003. He covered the Kosovo War and was in Afghanistan in 2001 during the Battle of Tora Bora and the search by US allies for Osama bin Laden. Hooper's The Spaniards: A portrait of the new Spain won the 1987 Allen Lane award for a best first work of history or literature. He later published two expanded and revised versions as The New Spaniards (1995 and 2006). The 2006 edition was described as "essential reading for all who wish to understand the new Spain" by Sir Raymond Carr in a review for The Spectator. In 2015, Hooper published The Italians, a portrait of the Italian people and their culture.

His latest work, with Anna Kraczyna, is an annotated translation of Carlo Collodi's The Adventures of Pinocchio published by Penguin Classics. Between 2016 and 2022, Hooper lectured on contemporary Italian history at Stanford University's campus in Florence. In 2021, he was made an honorary fellow of St Catharine's College, Cambridge. Hooper was the script consultant for the film Posso Entrare, directed by Trudie Styler and released in 2023.

== Bibliography ==
- John Hooper, The Spaniards: a portrait of the new Spain New York: Viking, 1986. ISBN 0-14-009808-9
- John Hooper, The New Spaniards Penguin, 2006. ISBN 0-14-101609-4
- John Hooper, The Italians Viking, 2015. ISBN 978-0-525-42807-7
- John Hooper and Anna Kraczyna, The Adventures of Pinocchio Penguin, 2021. ISBN 978-0-143-13609-5
