= Modular symbol =

In mathematics, modular symbols, introduced independently by Bryan John Birch and by Manin (1972), span a vector space closely related to a space of modular forms, on which the action of the Hecke algebra can be described explicitly. This makes them useful for computing with spaces of modular forms.

== Definition ==
The abelian group of (universal weight 2) modular symbols is spanned by symbols {α,β} for α, β in the rational projective line Q ∪ {∞} subject to the relations

- {α,β} + {β,γ} = {α,γ}

Informally, {α,β} represents a homotopy class of paths from α to β in the upper half-plane.

The group GL_{2}(Q) acts on the rational projective line, and this induces an action on the modular symbols.

There is a pairing between cusp forms f of weight 2 and modular symbols given by integrating the cusp form, or rather fdτ, along the path corresponding to the symbol.
