= Roy Jackson (chemical engineer) =

British chemical engineer (1931–2026)

- Born: 6 October 1931; Manchester, England
- Died: 20 July 2026 (aged 94); New Bern, North Carolina, U.S.
- Education: Trinity College, Cambridge
- Occupation: Chemical engineer
- Spouse: Susan Birch (m. 1957; died. 1991)
- Relatives: Bryan Birch (brother-in-law)

Roy Jackson (6 October 1931 – 20 July 2026) was a British chemical engineer.

== Early life and career ==
Jackson was born in Manchester on 6 October 1931. His father was a grocer, and his mother was a homemaker. He attended Bolton School, but his education was interrupted when he enlisted in the Royal Air Force. After his discharge, he attended Trinity College, Cambridge, earning his BA degree in physics in 1954, which after earning his degree, he worked as an engineer at Imperial Chemical Industries. He served as a professor in the department of chemical engineering at the University of Edinburgh in 1961, and in 1968, he was awarded an honorary doctorate of science.

He served as a professor in the department of chemical engineering at Princeton University from 1982 to 1998. During his years as a professor, he was named the Class of 1950 Professor in Engineering and Applied Science. In 2000, he was named a fellow of the Royal Society.

== Personal life and death ==
In 1957, Jackson married Susan Birch, the sister of Bryan Birch, a mathematician. Their marriage lasted until her death in 1991. He died in New Bern, North Carolina on 20 July 2026, at the age of 94.
