= Isaac Newton Institute =

International research institute

Coordinates: 52.20989°N 0.10287°E

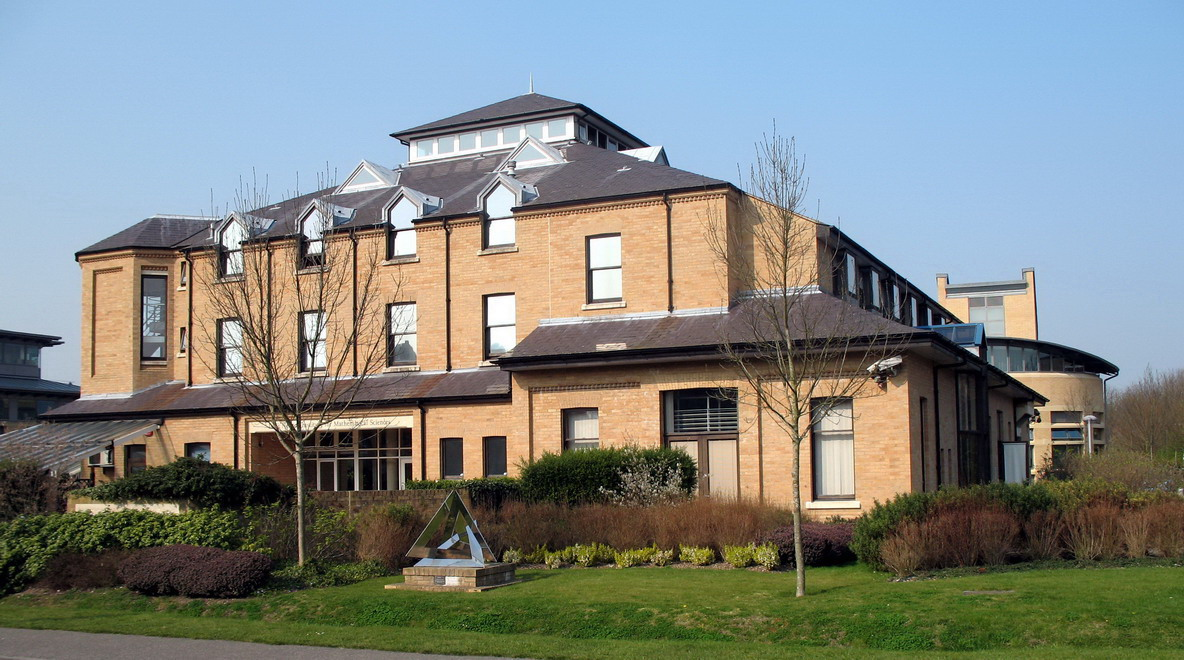
Main building for the Isaac Newton Institute

The Isaac Newton Institute for Mathematical Sciences is an international research institute for mathematics and its applications at the University of Cambridge. It is named after one of the university's most illustrious figures, the mathematician and natural philosopher Sir Isaac Newton, and occupies one of the buildings in the Cambridge Centre for Mathematical Sciences.

== History ==
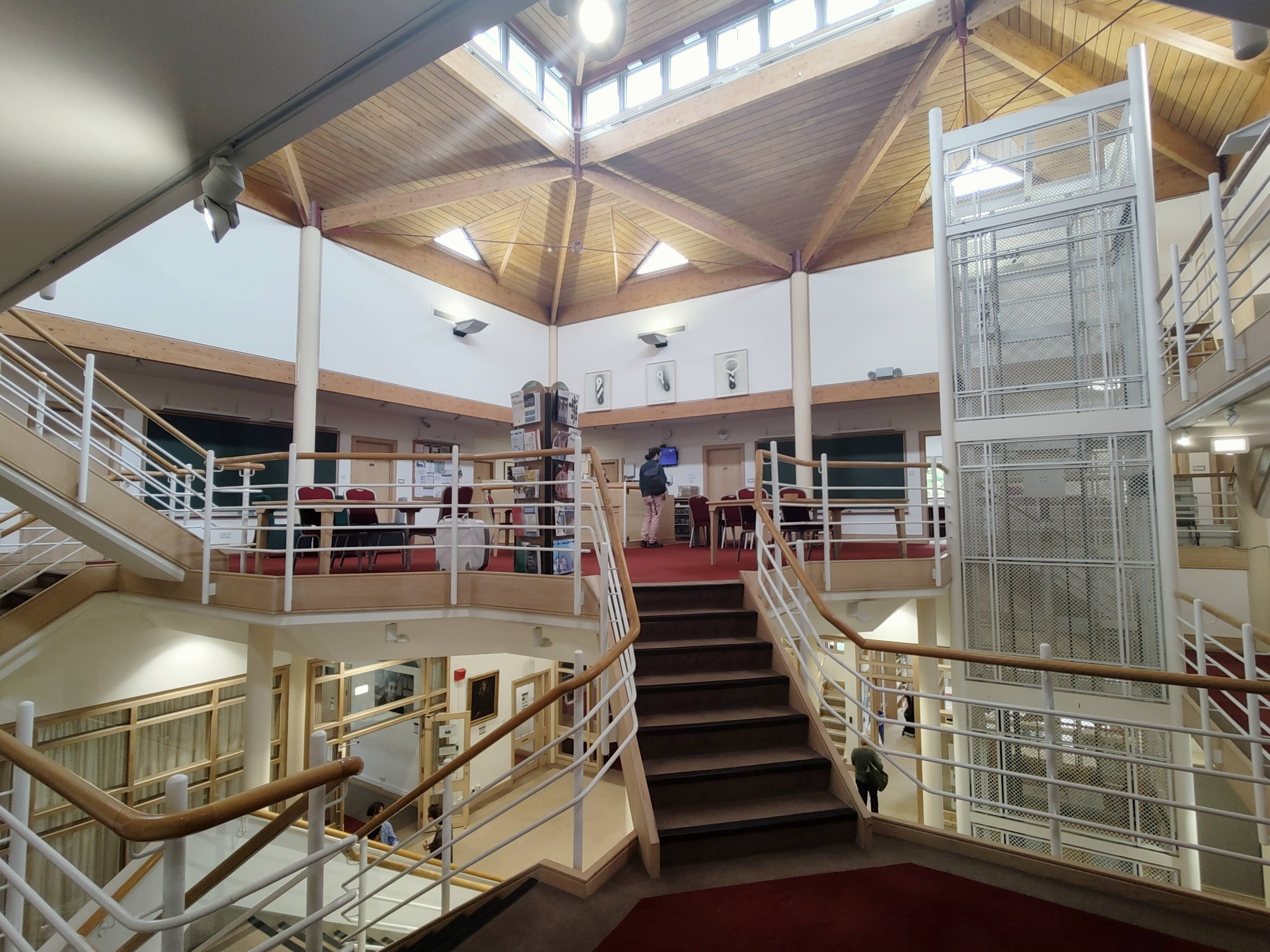
View of the interior of the Isaac Newton Institute building showing its large number of blackboards

After a national competition run by SERC, the Science and Engineering Research Council (now known as EPSRC Engineering and Physical Sciences Research Council), this institute was chosen to be the national research institute for mathematical sciences in the UK. It opened in 1992 with support from St John's College and Trinity College. St. John's provided the land and a purpose-built building, Trinity provided running costs for the first five years and the London Mathematical Society provided other support.

Shortly afterwards at the institute, the British mathematician Andrew Wiles announced his approach to proving Fermat's Last Theorem in three lectures on 21–23 June 1993. In 1999 the institute was awarded a Queen's Anniversary Prize in recognition of "world-class achievement in education." Although it is part of the national infrastructure for mathematical research, it is formally part of the University of Cambridge, from which it receives some funding. Nowadays five UK Research Councils, BBSRC, EPSRC, ESRC, NERC, STFC support about 55% of its activity. A number of philanthropic individuals, family and educational trusts, private companies and bodies associated with the University of Cambridge give their support.

== Scientific programmes ==
There are typically two or three programmes at any one time, each with up to twenty people and lasting between 4 weeks and 6 months. During these periods of activity there are courses and workshops for the attendees.

Programmes are chosen from proposals that cover the entire range of mathematical sciences and their applications by a Scientific Steering Committee of mathematical scientists solely on their scientific merit and the likelihood that they will have significant impact in their subject.

Although programmes are normally residential and planned several years ahead, during the COVID-19 pandemic, an urgent 6-workshop virtual programme on the Infectious Dynamics of Pandemics was approved and ran from April to September 2020. This was a successor to a 2013 programme on Infectious Disease Dynamics, and was complemented by virtual study groups and commissioned modelling for government.

== Directors ==
- 1991–1996 Sir Michael Atiyah OM FRS
- 1996–2001 Keith Moffatt FRS
- 2001–2006 Sir John Kingman FRS
- 2006–2011 Sir David Wallace CBE FRS
- 2011–2016 John Toland FRS
- 2016–2021 David Abrahams
- 2021– Ulrike Tillmann FRS
