= Peter Swinnerton-Dyer =

British mathematician (1927–2018)

Sir Peter Swinnerton-Dyer Bt KBE FRS
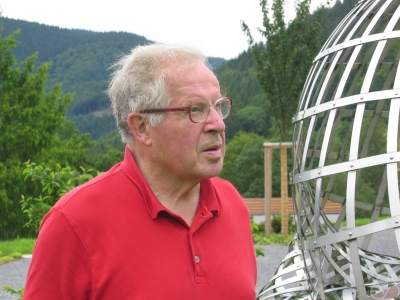
- Peter Swinnerton-Dyer at the workshop "Explicit methods in number theory" in Oberwolfach, 2007
- Born: Henry Peter Francis Swinnerton-Dyer; 2 August 1927; Ponteland, Northumberland, England
- Died: 26 December 2018 (aged 91)
- Education: University of Cambridge
- Known for: Birch and Swinnerton-Dyer conjecture
- Awards: Pólya Prize (2006); Sylvester Medal (2006)
- Scientific career
- Fields: Mathematics
- Workplaces: University of Cambridge
- Doctoral advisors: John Littlewood; André Weil
- Doctoral students: Jean-Louis Colliot-Thélène; Miles Reid

Sir Henry Peter Francis Swinnerton-Dyer, 16th Baronet, KBE, FRS (2 August 1927 – 26 December 2018) was an English mathematician specialising in number theory at the University of Cambridge. As a mathematician he was best known for his part in the Birch and Swinnerton-Dyer conjecture relating algebraic properties of elliptic curves to special values of L-functions, which was developed with Bryan Birch during the first half of the 1960s with the help of machine computation, and for his work on the Titan operating system.

== Biography ==
Swinnerton-Dyer was the son of Sir Leonard Schroeder Swinnerton Dyer, 15th Baronet, and his wife Barbara, daughter of Hereward Brackenbury. He was educated at the Dragon School in Oxford, Eton College and Trinity College, Cambridge, where he was supervised by J. E. Littlewood, and at some time in the late 1940s achieved the position of Senior Wrangler on the Mathematical Tripos at the latter. He also spent a year abroad as a Commonwealth Fund Fellow at the University of Chicago.

Swinnerton-Dyer was later made a fellow of Trinity, and was master of St Catharine's College from 1973 to 1983 and vice-chancellor of the University of Cambridge from 1979 to 1981. In 1983 he was made an honorary fellow of St Catharine's.

In that same year, he became chairman of the University Grants Committee and then from 1989, chief executive of its successor, the Universities Funding Council.

He was elected a fellow of the Royal Society in 1967 and was made a KBE in 1987. In 1981, he was awarded an honorary degree (Doctor of Science) by the University of Bath. In 1991, he received an honorary DSc degree from Ulster University. In 2006, he was awarded the Sylvester Medal, and also the Pólya Prize (LMS).

Swinnerton-Dyer was, in his younger days, an international bridge player, representing the British team twice in the European Open teams championship. In 1953 at Helsinki he was partnered by Dimmie Fleming: the team came second out of fifteen teams. In 1962 he was partnered by Ken Barbour; the team came fourth out of twelve teams at Beirut.

He married Harriet Crawford in 1983.

=== Research ===
Atkin and Swinnerton-Dyer verified and extended several conjectures of Freeman Dyson on congruences of the partition function p(n). Extensions of Dyson's musings on congruences of the partition function continue to be an active area of research.

In the late 1950s Swinnerton-Dyer began a collaboration with Bryan Birch, exploring ideas of Siegel and Tamagawa in the context of elliptic curves over the rationals. They did extensive computations of elliptic curves on the Cambridge EDSAC-2, which led them to their famous Birch and Swinnerton-Dyer conjecture.

Swinnerton-Dyer was the first to construct a cubic surface over $\Q$ for which the Hasse principle provably fails. Ernst S. Selmer had previously shown by example that the Hasse–Minkowski theorem cannot be extended to forms of degree 3.

Atkin and Swinnerton-Dyer initiated the study of the arithmetic properties of modular forms for noncongruence subgroups in the late 1960s, and observed very interesting congruence relations for such forms. They conjectured that if a modular form f(τ) is not modular for some congruence subgroup of the modular group, then the Fourier coefficients of f(τ) have unbounded denominators, which became known as the Atkin-Swinnerton-Dyer unbounded denominators conjecture. The conjecture was proved by Frank Calegari, Vesselin Dimitrov and Yunqing Tang in 2021.

=== Death ===
Swinnerton-Dyer died on 26 December 2018 at the age of 91.

== Books ==
- Swinnerton-Dyer, H.P.F. (1974), Analytic theory of Abelian varieties, LMS Lecture Notes, vol. 14, Cambridge University Press, ISBN 0-521-20526-3.
- Swinnerton-Dyer, Peter (2001), A brief guide to algebraic number theory, LMS Student Text, Cambridge University Press, ISBN 0-521-00423-3.

== See also ==
- List of Masters of St Catharine's College, Cambridge
- List of Vice-Chancellors of the University of Cambridge
- Littlewood conjecture
- Rank of a partition
- Swinnerton-Dyer polynomials

== Notes ==
Baronetage of England
Preceded by Leonard Schroeder Swinnerton Dyer	Baronet (of Tottenham); 1975–2018	Succeeded by David Dyer-Bennett
Academic offices
Preceded by Edwin Ernest Rich	Master of St Catharine's College, Cambridge; 1973–1983	Succeeded by Barry Supple
Preceded by Sir Alan Cottrell	Vice-Chancellor of the University of Cambridge; 1979–1981	Succeeded by Sir Harry Hinsley
