= John Toland (mathematician) =

Professor of mathematics

John Toland FRS FRSE
- Born: 28 April 1949 (age 77)
- Education: Queen's University Belfast; University of Sussex
- Awards: Sylvester Medal; Berwick Prize
- Scientific career
- Thesis: Topological Methods for Nonlinear Eigenvalue Problems (1973)
- Doctoral advisor: Charles A. Stuart
- Website: www.newton.ac.uk/about/history/toland

John Francis Toland (born 28 April 1949 in Derry) is an Irish mathematician based in the UK. From 2011 to 2016 he served as director of the Isaac Newton Institute for Mathematical Sciences and N M Rothschild & Sons Professor of Mathematical Sciences at the University of Cambridge.

== Education ==
Toland was educated at St Columb's College in Derry and Queen's University Belfast, where he was awarded a Bachelor of Science degree in 1970. He completed postgraduate study at the University of Sussex, where he was awarded a PhD in 1973 for research on topological methods for nonlinear eigenvalue problems supervised by Charles A. Stuart.

== Career and research ==
From 1982 to 2011 he was professor of mathematics at the University of Bath, where he held an Engineering and Physical Sciences Research Council (EPSRC) Senior Fellowship 1997–2002. In addition from 2002 to 2010 he was scientific director of the International Centre for Mathematical Sciences (ICMS) in Edinburgh. In 2011 he succeeded Sir David Wallace as director of the Isaac Newton Institute for Mathematical Sciences and N M Rothschild & Sons Professor of Mathematical Sciences at the University of Cambridge. In 2016 he was succeeded as director by Professor David Abrahams. His research interests include mathematical analysis and nonlinear partial differential equations with particular interest in the rigorous theory of steady water waves. In 1978, he proved George Gabriel Stokes' conjecture on the existence of gravity waves of maximum height on deep water, a previously open problem in mathematical hydrodynamics which dated back to the 19th century.

== Awards and honours ==
He was elected Fellow of the Royal Society (FRS) in 1999, and a Fellow of the Royal Society of Edinburgh (FRSE) in 2003. He was awarded the London Mathematical Society's Senior Berwick Prize in 2000; and the Royal Society's Sylvester Medal in 2012.

He is an Honorary Fellow of University College London and was a Fellow of St John's College, Cambridge October 2011 – September 2016.

The University of Bath awarded Toland an Honorary Doctorate of Science in December 2017.
