= Birch's theorem =

Statement about the representability of zero by odd degree forms

In mathematics, Birch's theorem, named for Bryan John Birch, is a statement about the representability of zero by odd degree forms.

== Statement of Birch's theorem ==
Let K be an algebraic number field, k, l and n be natural numbers, r_{1}, ..., r_{k} be odd natural numbers, and f_{1}, ..., f_{k} be homogeneous polynomials with coefficients in K of degrees r_{1}, ..., r_{k} respectively in n variables. Then there exists a number ψ(r_{1}, ..., r_{k}, l, K) such that if

$$n \ge \psi(r_1,\ldots,r_k,l,K)$$

then there exists an l-dimensional vector subspace V of K^{n} such that

$$f_1(x) = \cdots = f_k(x) = 0 \text{ for all } x \in V.$$

== Remarks ==
The proof of the theorem is by induction over the maximal degree of the forms f_{1}, ..., f_{k}. Essential to the proof is a special case, which can be proved by an application of the Hardy–Littlewood circle method, of the theorem which states that if n is sufficiently large and r is odd, then the equation

$$c_1x_1^r+\cdots+c_nx_n^r=0,\quad c_i \in \mathbb{Z},\ i=1,\ldots,n$$

has a solution in integers x_{1}, ..., x_{n}, not all of which are 0.

The restriction to odd r is necessary, since even degree forms, such as positive definite quadratic forms, may take the value 0 only at the origin.
