= Gerald Russell Wickham =

British applied mathematician

Gerald Russell Wickham (8 November 1943 – 24 December 1995) was a British applied mathematician known for his influential contributions to wave propagation, elastodynamics, and ultrasonic non-destructive evaluation (NDE). He spent most of his academic career at the University of Manchester before becoming Professor of Mathematics at Brunel University in 1995.

== Early life and education ==
Wickham was born in Hampshire, England, and attended Brockenhurst Grammar School. He studied Technological Mathematics at the University of Surrey, earning a B.Sc. in 1966. He completed his Ph.D. in 1970 under R. Shail with a thesis titled Some boundary effects in continuum mechanics.

== Academic career ==
In 1969, Wickham joined the Department of Mathematics, University of Manchester, where he remained for over 25 years. He played a major role in departmental development, including early computerisation efforts. In 1995, he was appointed to a Chair of Mathematics at Brunel University.

His colleagues described him as highly sociable and enthusiastic about collaboration: "his gregariousness was legendary: he loved conferences as much (if not more) for their social interaction as for their technical proceedings."

== Research contributions ==
=== Ultrasonic non-destructive evaluation ===
Wickham was internationally recognised for his work on elastic wave scattering and ultrasonic inspection. He collaborated extensively with the UK Central Electricity Generating Board (CEGB) and later Nuclear Electric, contributing to theoretical models used in safety assessments for nuclear reactors, including Sizewell B.

His research included:

- modelling ultrasonic transducers
- scattering from smooth and rough cracks
- wave propagation in anisotropic and grainy materials
- development of "crack Green's functions" for diffraction problems

"This work inspired the development of the CEGB’s theoretical model for the ultrasonic non-destructive testing of smooth cracks."

=== Collaborations ===
Wickham collaborated with several prominent researchers, including:

- I.D. Abrahams (matrix Wiener–Hopf factorisation; anisotropic media)
- J.G. Harris (imperfect interfaces)
- A.N. Norris (structural acoustics; resonators)
- Zhiming Sun (inverse problems)

He spent his sabbatical year (1991–1992) at the Ames Laboratory, Iowa State University, working on inverse scattering.

=== Publications ===
Wickham authored or co-authored more than 40 research papers in journals such as Proceedings of the Royal Society A, Wave Motion, Journal of the Acoustical Society of America, and Journal of Elasticity. A complete list appears in the appreciation article.

== Other activities ==
Outside academia, Wickham advised Granada Television on mathematical recreations and puzzles. He contributed to the design of several game shows, most notably The Krypton Factor, and co-authored two popular puzzle books.

== Death ==
Wickham died suddenly on 24 December 1995 from brain haemorrhages at the age of 52. He was survived by his wife Sue and their two children. His colleagues wrote that "to all of us who knew him, it was his influence on our own endeavours that will remain."

== Selected publications ==
- Shail, R.; Wickham, G.R. (1972). "The torsional oscillations of a rigid spherical inclusion embedded in an elastic stratum". Journal of Elasticity.
- Wickham, G.R. (1981). "The diffraction of stress waves by a plane finite crack in two dimensions". Proceedings of the Royal Society A.
- Martin, P.A.; Wickham, G.R. (1983). "Diffraction of elastic waves by a penny-shaped crack". Proceedings of the Royal Society A.
- Norris, A.N.; Wickham, G.R. (1993). "Elastic Helmholtz resonators". Journal of the Acoustical Society of America.
