= Bryan John Birch =

British mathematician (born 1931)

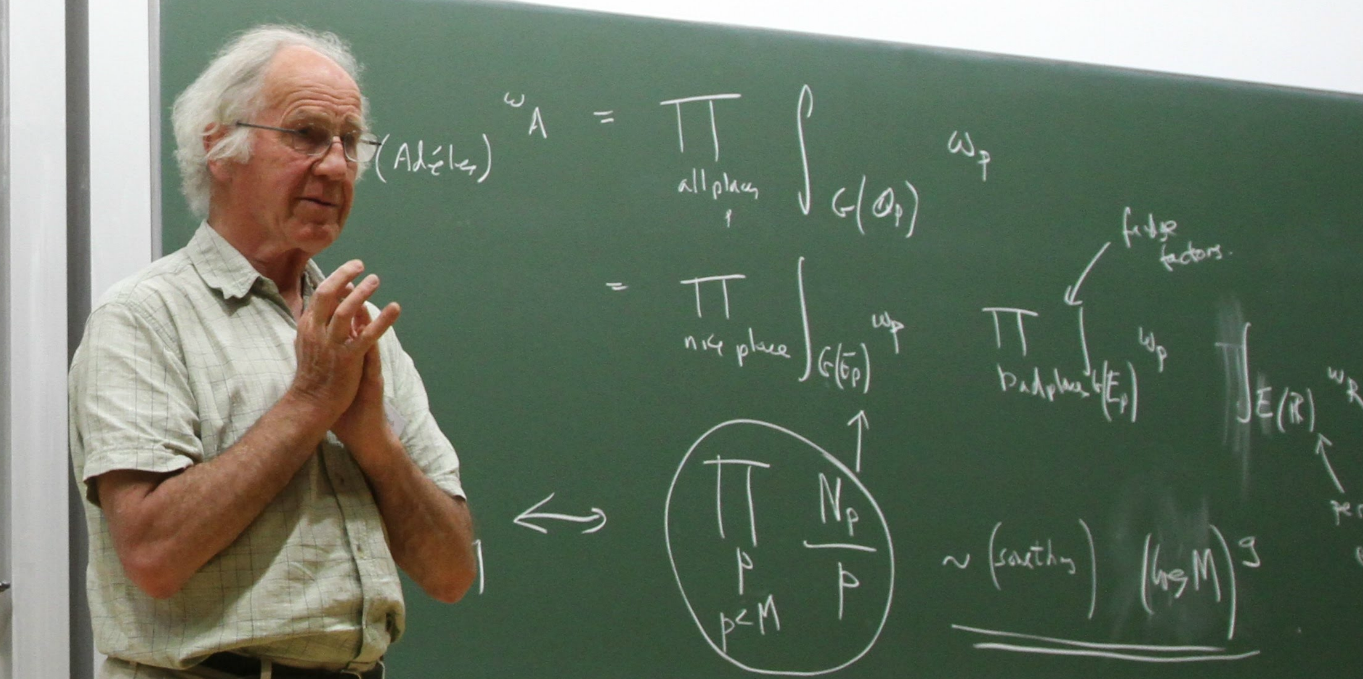
- Birch explaining the Birch and Swinnerton-Dyer Conjecture at the University of Cambridge in May 2011
- Born: 25 September 1931 (age 95); Burton-upon-Trent, England
- Education: Trinity College, Cambridge
- Known for: Birch and Swinnerton-Dyer conjecture Birch–Tate conjecture Birch's theorem Heegner point Modular symbol
- Relatives: Roy Jackson (brother-in-law)
- Awards: Senior Whitehead Prize (1993); De Morgan Medal (2007); Sylvester Medal (2020)
- Scientific career
- Fields: Mathematics
- Workplaces: University of Oxford
- Doctoral advisor: J. W. S. Cassels
- Doctoral students: Kaye Stacey

Bryan John Birch FRS (born 25 September 1931) is a British mathematician known for his work in number theory. His name has been given to the Birch and Swinnerton-Dyer conjecture.

== Biography ==
Bryan John Birch was born in Burton-on-Trent, the son of Arthur Jack and Mary Edith Birch. He was educated at Shrewsbury School and Trinity College, Cambridge. He married Gina Margaret Christ in 1961. They have three children.

As a doctoral student at the University of Cambridge, he was officially working under J. W. S. Cassels. More influenced by Harold Davenport, he proved Birch's theorem, one of the results to come out of the Hardy–Littlewood circle method.

Birch then worked with Peter Swinnerton-Dyer on computations relating to the Hasse–Weil L-functions of elliptic curves. Their subsequently formulated conjecture relating the rank of an elliptic curve to the order of zero of an L-function has been an influence on the development of number theory from the mid-1960s onwards.

Birch introduced modular symbols in about 1971.

In later work, Birch contributed to algebraic K-theory (Birch–Tate conjecture). He then formulated ideas on the role of Heegner points (he was one of those reconsidering Kurt Heegner's original work on the class number one problem, which had not initially gained acceptance). Birch put together the context in which the Gross–Zagier theorem was proved; the correspondence is now published.

Birch was a visiting scholar at the Institute for Advanced Study in the fall of 1983. He was elected a Fellow of the Royal Society in 1972; was awarded the Senior Whitehead Prize in 1993 and the De Morgan Medal in 2007 both of the London Mathematical Society. In 2012 he became a fellow of the American Mathematical Society. In 2020 he was awarded the Sylvester Medal by the Royal Society.

== Selected publications ==
- Computers in Number Theory. (editor). London: Academic Press, 1973.
- Modular function of one variable IV (editor) with W. Kuyk. Lecture Notes in Mathematics 476. Berlin: Springer Verlag, 1975. ISBN 3-540-07392-2
- The Collected Works of Harold Davenport. (editor). London: Academic Press, 1977.
