= Heegner point =

Special point on a modular curve in mathematics

In mathematics, a Heegner point is a point on a modular curve that is the image of a quadratic imaginary point of the upper half-plane. Heegner points were defined by Bryan Birch and named after Kurt Heegner, who used similar ideas to prove Gauss's conjecture on imaginary quadratic fields of class number one.

== Gross–Zagier theorem ==
The Gross–Zagier theorem (Gross & Zagier 1986) describes the height of Heegner points in terms of a derivative of the L-function of the elliptic curve at the point s = 1. In particular if the elliptic curve has (analytic) rank 1, then the Heegner points can be used to construct a rational point on the curve of infinite order (so the Mordell–Weil group has rank at least 1). More generally, Gross, Kohnen & Zagier (1987) showed that Heegner points could be used to construct rational points on the curve for each positive integer n, and the heights of these points were the coefficients of a modular form of weight 3/2. Shou-Wu Zhang generalized the Gross–Zagier theorem from elliptic curves to the case of modular abelian varieties (Zhang 2001, 2004, Yuan, Zhang & Zhang 2009).

== Birch and Swinnerton-Dyer conjecture ==
Kolyvagin later used Heegner points to construct Euler systems, and used this to prove much of the Birch–Swinnerton-Dyer conjecture for rank 1 elliptic curves. Brown proved the Birch–Swinnerton-Dyer conjecture for most rank 1 elliptic curves over global fields of positive characteristic (Brown 1994).

== Computation ==
Heegner points can be used to compute very large rational points on rank 1 elliptic curves (see (Watkins 2006) for a survey) that could not be found by naive methods. Implementations of the algorithm are available in Magma, PARI/GP, and Sage.
