= RedBall Project =

Street art

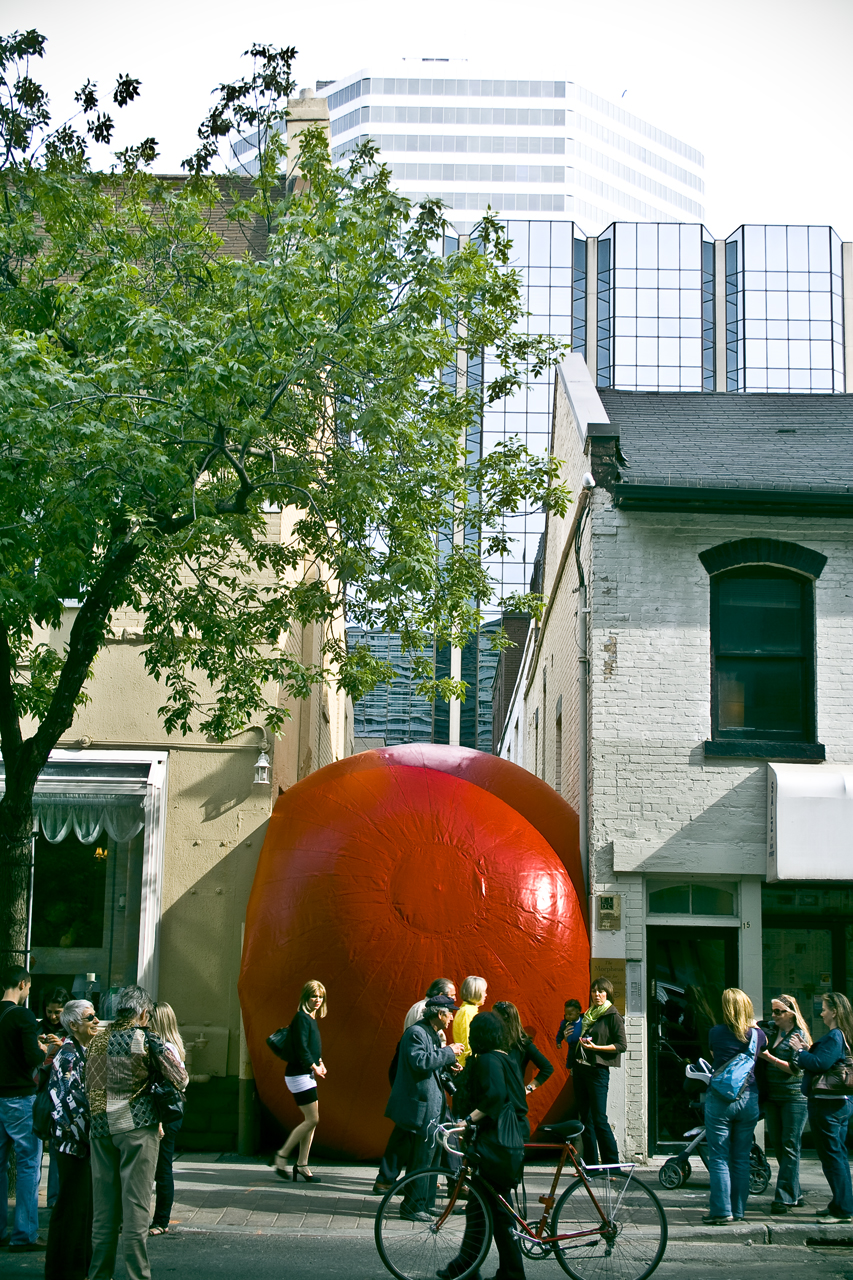
- RedBall in Toronto, Canada in 2009
- Artist: Kurt Perschke
- Type: 15 feet in diameter (4.5 meters), 269 pounds (122 kg) inflated or 250 pounds (110 kg) deflated

RedBall Project is a public travelling street art piece by US-born artist Kurt Perschke. Considered “the world's longest-running street art work" the project consists of a 15 ft inflated red ball wedged in different city spaces in various cities around the world. Placed in a choreographed suite of installations within a city and usually lasting one or two weeks, each specific site lasts only one day. RedBall Project has received strong international media and public attention, and has been featured in several urban art books, art journals, and media.

== Kurt Perschke ==
RedBall was created in 2001 by contemporary artist Kurt Perschke. Perschke is best known for his works in sculpture, video, collage, set design and public space. Other prominent works by Perschke include commissions for various institutions including The Contemporary Art Museum in St. Louis, Barcelona Museum of Contemporary Art, and Technisches Museum Wien. His set designs for Kate Weare Dance Company have also received critical accolades in The New York Times. Born in Chicago, Perschke currently lives and works in Brooklyn, New York.

== Design ==
The RedBall is 15 feet in diameter (4.5 meters) and weighs 269 pounds (122 kg) inflated or 250 pounds (110 kg) deflated.

== Exhibitions ==
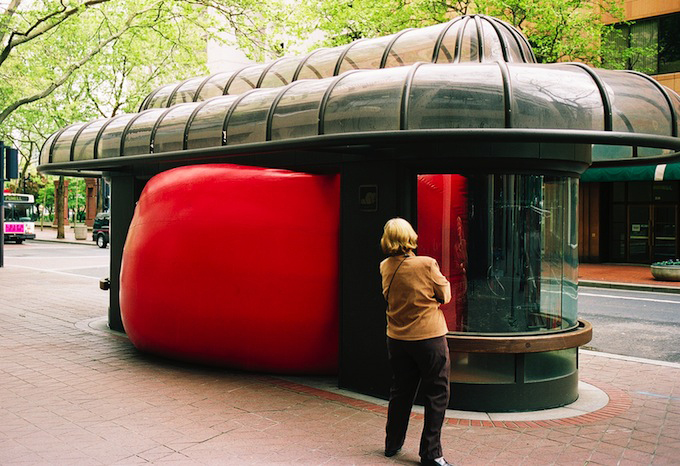
The sculpture in a Portland Transit Mall shelter in 2007

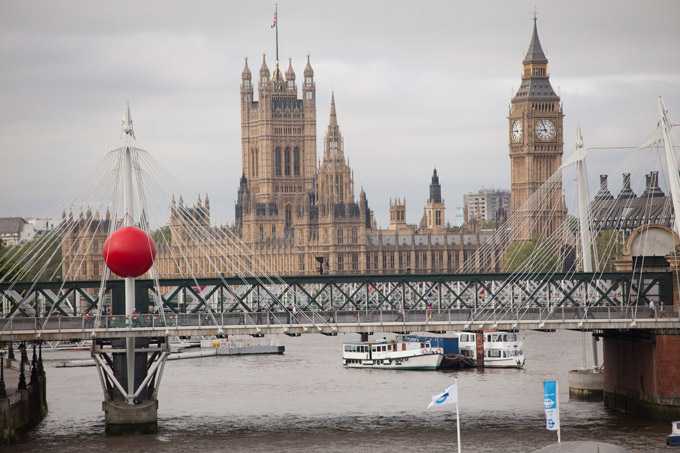
The sculpture wedged in London's Hungerford Bridge and Golden Jubilee Bridges

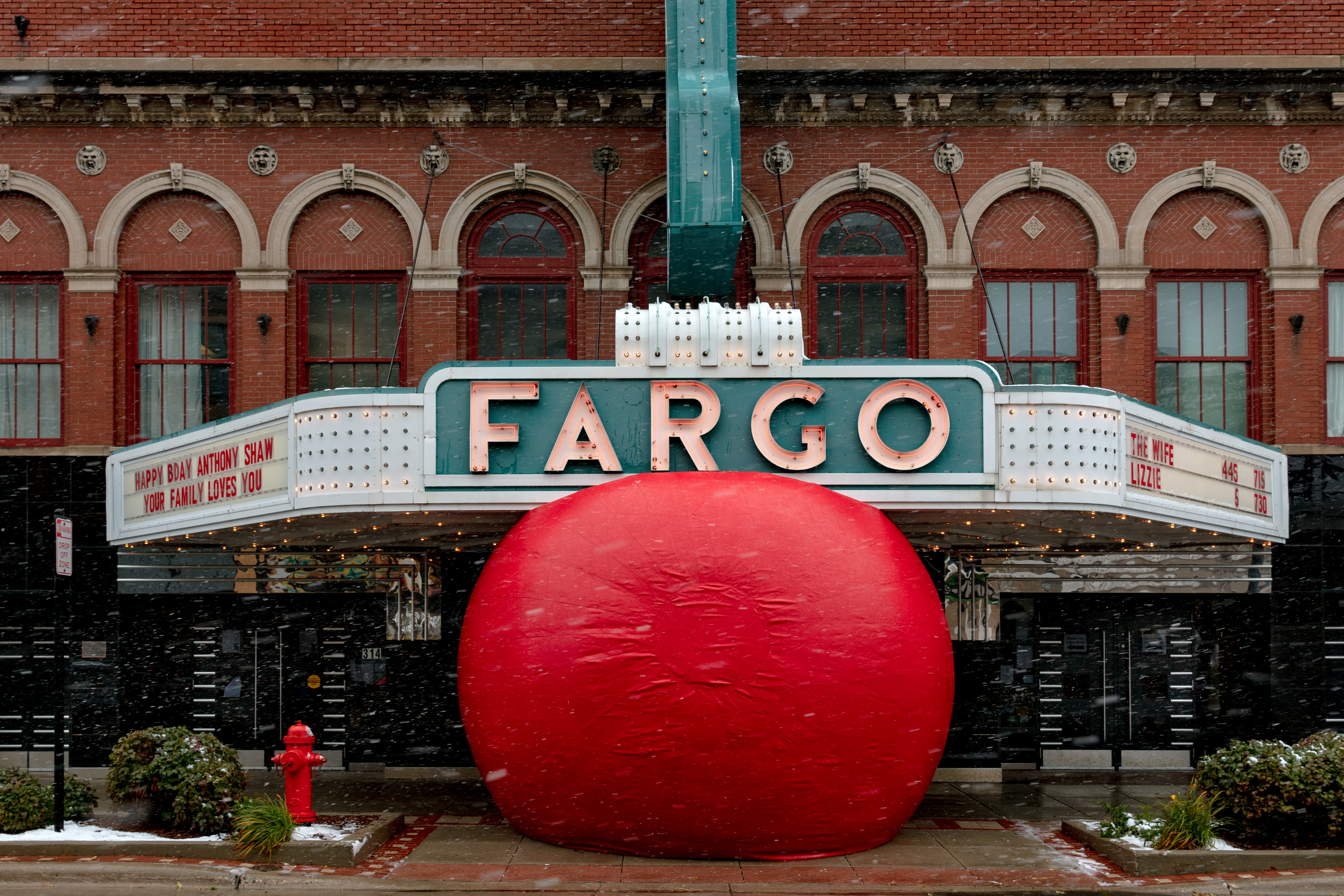
The sculpture in the snow under the Fargo Theatre marquee

| Year | City, country | Location |
|---|---|---|
| 2001 | St. Louis, US | |
| 2002 | Barcelona, Spain | El Bruc, Roman Wall, Jaume I, Barceloneta Beach, MACBA by Richard Meier, Barcelona Culture Studio |
| 2003 | Sydney, Australia | Harbour Bridge, Railway Square, Woolloomooloo Wharf, Market Street, Pit & Martin Place, Aurora Place, AMP Center, 28 Margaret, State Theatre, Phillip Street Industrial Court Building, Australia Square, MLC Center, Town Hall, Circular Quay |
| 2005 | Portland, US | Schnitzer Concert Hall, Portland City Hall, 5th Avenue Bus Stop, M.S. Glass, Weiden + Kennedy, Portland World Trade Center 2, Pioneer Square |
| 2007 | Chicago, US | Millennium Park, Spertus Institute, Wishbone Restaurant, Field Museum, Grant Park Grant Park, Seventeenth Church, LaSalle Bridge, Wicker Park – Damen Stop, Union Station/Jackson Bridge Hyde Park Art Center, IIT by Rem Koolhaas, Chess Pavilion, 19 S LaSalle, Calder’s ‘Flamingo’/Federal Plaza, Chicago Cultural Center |
| 2008 | Scottsdale, US | Trolley Bridge, McDowell Mountain Ranch Skate Park, Arabian Library, Bell Tower at Scottsdale Center for Performing Arts, Pinnacle Peak Park, Granite Reef, Loloma Station, Bentley Gallery |
| 2008 | Grand Rapids, Michigan, US | Gerald R. Ford Museum, UICA Opening Night, Rosa Parks Circle, GRCC Fieldhouse, The BOB, Grand Rapids Ballet |
| 2008 | Toronto, Canada | Nathan Phillips Square, Old City Hall, First Canadian Place, Elm St. Alley, Ryerson University, Queen Street W. Alley, Harbourfront Centre |
| 2009 | Taipei, Taiwan | Chiang Kai-shek Memorial National Theater, Taipei Cinema Park, Exhibition SiteBo Pi Liao Street, Shin Kong Mall, Taipei MOCA |
| 2010 | Norwich, England | Norwich Railway Station, Novi Sad Friendship Bridge, York Alley, All Saints Green, Pull’s Ferry, St. Andrews Lych Gate, Fire Station, Chapelfield North, St. Peter Mancroft Church, Sainsbury Center for Visual Art, Norwich Castle, St. Gregory’s Alley, Norwich Cathedral |
| 2011 | Abu Dhabi, United Arab Emirates | Abu Dhabi Art, Corniche East, Qaryat Al Beri, Al Jahili FortAl Ain Palace Museum, Madinat Zayed, Qasr Al Sarab, Park, Emirates Palace, Corniche West, Zayed Stadium |
| 2012 | Perth, Australia | Cottesloe Beach, Subiaco Arts Centre, Fremantle Town Hall, Perth Train Station Overpass, Perth Convention Centre, Perth Train Station/Wellington Bus Station, Albany Town Hall, Albany Western Australian Museum, Downtown Albany Rotunda, State Theatre Centre of WA, UWA Library, Sail and Anchor Pub (Fremantle), UWA Writers Festival, YMCA Victoria Street, Council House, The Bakery, QV1 Fountain, Festival Gardens |
| 2012 | England | Paddington Beach, Brixham, Torquay Harbour, Torbay (Spanish Barn), Plymouth (Queen's Arms), Plymouth (White Lane), Plymouth Hoe, Exeter High St, Exeter Almshouse, Exeter River Quayside, Weymouth cider bar, Weymouth, Town Bridge, Weymouth, Esplanade, Weymouth, Portland Cove House Inn, London Golden Jubilee Bridge, Waterloo Bridge in London, Covent Garden in London, Millennium Bridge in London |
| 2012 | Leuven, Belgium | Rector de Somer Square, Martelaren Square, Mechelse Street, Kieken Street, Brussels Street, University Library, City Park |
| 2013 | California, US | Los Angeles Theatre, Edgemar Building, Security Pacific Building, Pershing Square, Four Embarcadero Center, Contemporary Jewish Museum, Bentley Reserve, BART Embarcadero Station, CA Lottery HQ |
| 2013 | Paris, France | Cafe Beaubourg, Hotel de Ville, Seine River Cruise, Passerelle Simone de Beauvoir, Canal St. Martin, Place du Commerce, Jardin du Luxembourg |
| 2013 | Lausanne, Switzerland | Bel-Air et Rue de Genève, EPFL – Learning center, Place Chauderon, Eglise St-François, Ouchy (Place de la Navigation), Place de l’Europe, Palais de Rumine |
| 2014 | Rennes, France | Opéra, Dames, Republic, Pont levis, Porte mordelaise, Station CDG, Ouest France, Saint George |
| 2014 | Galway, Ireland | Spanish Arch, Druid Lane, Quay Street, Promenade, Meyrick Hotel, Corrib River, Townhall Theatre |
| 2014 | Montreal, Canada | Biosphere, Place des Arts, Quartier des Spectacles, Berson Monuments, Parc Metrom Bank of Montreal, Fontaine Park |
| 2018 | Chapel Hill, North Carolina | |
| 2018 | Fargo, North Dakota, US and Moorhead, Minnesota, US | Plains Art Museum, Minnesota State University Moorhead, Great Northern Bicycle Company, Lindenwood-Gooseberry Park Pedestrian Bridge, Fargo Parks & Rec Office, Rourke Art Gallery + Museum, Fargo Theatre. |
| 2019 | Rouen, France | Gros-Horloge, Palais des Sports, Musée des Beaux-Arts |
| 2021 | Cognac, France | |
| 2021 | Santa Cruz, US | |
| 2022 | Liverpool, England | |
| 2023 | Saskatoon, Canada | |
| 2024 | Tainan, Taiwan | Official Reception Stone Arch, Chúi-sian-keng, Tainan Park Nenji-tei, NCKU, Anping Castle, Tainan Art Museum, The Spring, Xinhua District Council House, Zhuxi Moon -Viewing Bridge, Dainanmen Castle |

== Lawsuits ==
In May 2013, Perschke filed a lawsuit against the European conglomerate Edenred, S.A. over the use of RedBall Project’s concept in a promotional campaign. The international law firm Gibson, Dunn & Crutcher took on the cross-border dispute and filed a complaint in Federal court against Edenred. The case was settled out of court. While the precise terms of the resolution remain confidential by mutual agreement, it has been reported as “a legal victory for RedBall Project”. Perschke said that he views the resolution as favorable because it was based on terms that respect his intellectual property rights. In 2015, Perschke accused Shell Oil Company to have used his concept of the RedBall project in a global print ad campaign. The accusation on artistic copyright infringement received media attention. The ad campaign was ended, and the case was settled out of court.

== Publications featuring RedBall Project ==
- "Big Art, Small Art" (Manco, Tristan), Thames & Hudson; 1 edition (October 14, 2014), ISBN 978-0500239223
- "Overs!ze" (Viction:ary), Victionary (May 24, 2013), ISBN 978-9881943989
- “Going Public” (R. Klanten, S. Ehmann, S. Borges, L. Feireiss Release), Gestalten (August 2012), ISBN 978-3-89955-440-3
- "The Red Rubber Ball at Work" (Caroll, Kevin), McGraw Hill (October 1, 2008), ISBN 0071599444
- "The Artist’s Guide" (Battenfield, Jackie), Da Capo Press (June 9, 2009), ISBN 978-0306816529
- "Creaticity" (Poch Poch), Gustavo Gili (2010), ISBN 8494115413

== Awards ==
- National Recognition to the Best in Public Art Projects Annually, Public Art Network, Americans for the Arts (2006).
