= Academy for the Mathematical Sciences =

British Academic Society

- Formation: September 2023
- Legal status: Charitable Incorporated Organisation
- Headquarters: Isaac Newton Institute, Cambridge
- Location: United Kingdom
- Members: 100 Fellows, 1 Honorary Fellow
- President: Alison Etheridge
- CEO: Christie Marr
- Chair / Vice President: Nigel Campbell
- Main organ: Board of Trustees
- Website: www.acadmathsci.org.uk

The Academy for the Mathematical Sciences is a UK national academy. Founded in 2023, the Academy aims to provide an authoritative and unified voice for mathematics in public life and policy, promoting the discipline’s contributions to national and global challenges in areas such as artificial intelligence, climate science, education, national security and economic resilience. The first president is Dame Alison Etheridge, a professor at the Department of Statistics, University of Oxford.

== Origins ==
A national academy was formally proposed in a report by Philip Bond and a detailed prospectus was produced by the Council for the Mathematical Sciences. Growing applications of mathematical modelling and data science in stimulating demand for mathematical scientists were supported by a longer running concern that maths was neglected in public policy. The UK government agreed in principle to support a new academy and launched a consultation on the requirements, followed by inviting bids to host the new body.

Although £6M over three years had been committed in the 2023 Autumn Statement, after the 2024 General Election, the new Labour administration withdrew financial support. This was acrimonious as no specific allocation had been made but funding was hypothecated on the treasury reserve and neither government nor opposition took responsibility for letting down the mathematics community.

== Organisation ==
The academy is registered as a charitable incorporated organisation. It is hosted by the Isaac Newton Institute (INI) in Cambridge, UK. After an open application process, Alison Etheridge was announced as the first president in May 2024. The chair of trustees and vice president is Nigel Campbell, a former civil servant and government analyst; the executive director is Dr Christie Marr, previously deputy director at INI.

The academy works across the UK and the nations of Wales, Northern Ireland and Scotland. The Council for the Mathematical Sciences has been subsumed into the new academy, as its Learned Societies Forum. The academy has also formed an education committee, chaired by Lynne McClure, to represent the interests of maths education in the UK.

== Fellowship ==
The 100 founding fellows of the academy were announced on 29 January 2026 after an open competition. They comprise leading mathematical researchers and practitioners in education, academia, industry and government. The science minister Patrick Vallance was quoted:

The Academy for the Mathematical Sciences’ inaugural Fellows represent the very best of this national capability, and I commend the Academy for bringing them together. Their expertise strengthens our security, boosts productivity and supports high‑quality jobs across the country, so it is only right that they are celebrated.

Notable fellows include John Aston, June Barrow-Green, Veronica Bowman, Margaret Brown, Chris Budd, Kevin Buzzard, Ana Caraiani, Jose Antonio Carrillo de la Plata, Gui Qiang George Chen, Rama Cont, Anne-Christine Davis, Claudia de Rham, Simon Donaldson, Christl Donnelly, Paul Glaister, Paul Glendinning, Leslie Ann Goldberg, Darryl Holm, Kevin Houston, Celia Hoyles, Daniel Hulme, Eugénie Hunsicker, Anne Keast-Butler, Minhyong Kim, Ruth King, James Maynard, Guy Nason, Simon Peyton-Jones, Lasse Rempe, Richard Samworth, Carola-Bibiane Schönlieb, Jennifer Scott, Bobby Seagull, David Silver, David Spiegelhalter, Gwyneth Stallard, Aris Syntetos, Jack Thorne, Sarah Waters, Wendelin Werner and Helen Wilson.
