= Alison Etheridge =

Professor of Probability

Dame Alison Etheridge DBE FRS FIMA
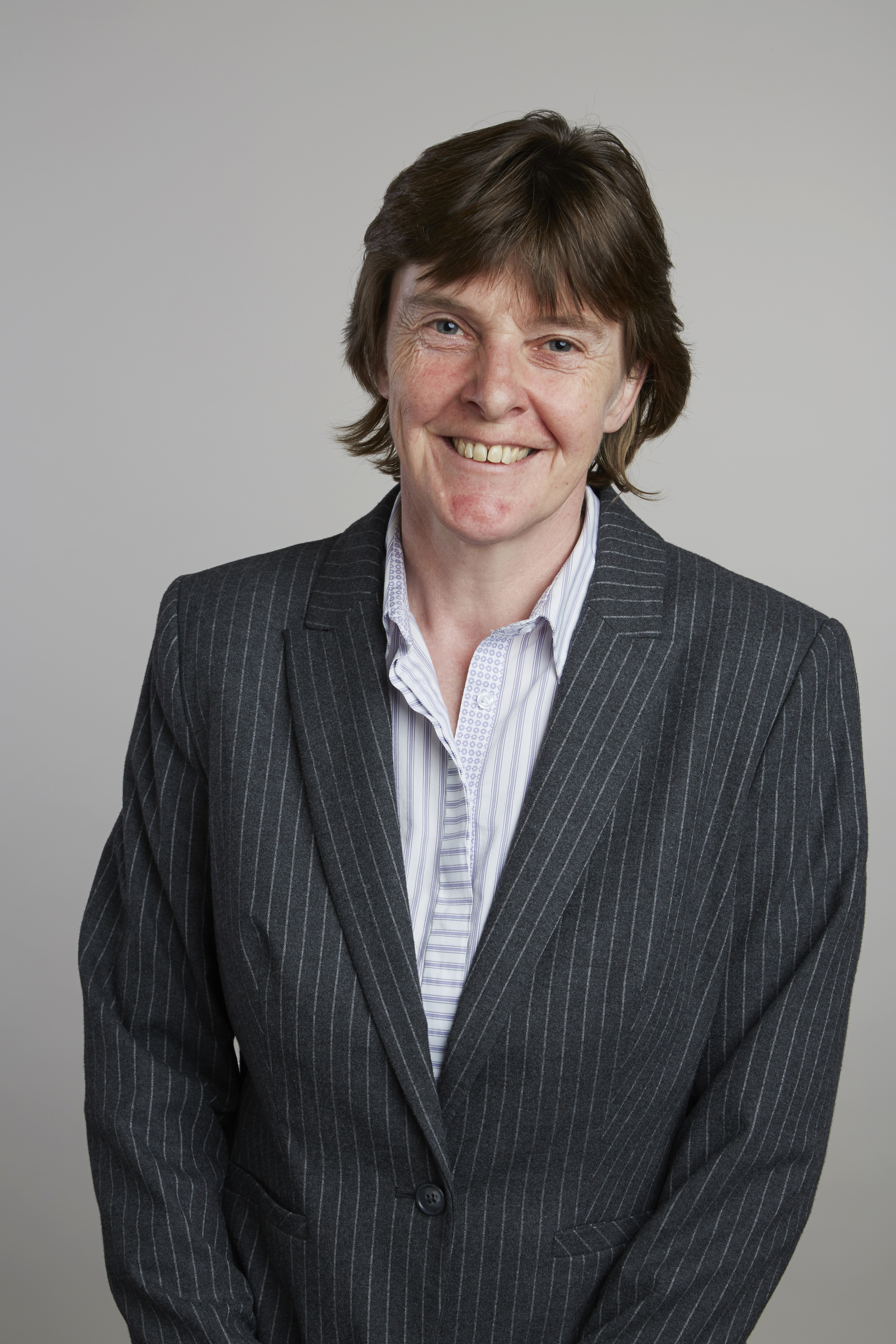
- Alison Etheridge at the Royal Society admissions day in 2015
- Born: Alison Mary Etheridge; 27 April 1964 (age 62); Wolverhampton
- Citizenship: British
- Education: Smestow Comprehensive School; University of Oxford (MA, DPhil)
- Spouse: Lionel Mason (m. 1997)
- Awards: Senior Anne Bennett Prize (2017); David Crighton Medal (2023)
- Scientific career
- Fields: Probability; Population genetics; Mathematical ecology
- Workplaces: University of Oxford; University of Cambridge; University of California, Berkeley; University of Edinburgh; Queen Mary University of London
- Thesis: Asymptotic Behaviour of Some Measure-Valued Diffusions (1989)
- Doctoral advisor: David Albert Edwards
- Website: www.stats.ox.ac.uk/all-people/alison-etheridge/; www.maths.ox.ac.uk/people/alison.etheridge

Dame Alison Mary Etheridge (born 1964) is Professor of Probability and former Head of the Department of Statistics, University of Oxford. Etheridge is a fellow of Magdalen College, Oxford and president of the Academy for the Mathematical Sciences.

== Education ==
Etheridge was educated at Smestow School. She read mathematics in New College, Oxford, earning a bachelor's degree in 1985 and staying on for a year of master's research. After a traveling to McGill University from 1986 to 1987, with the support of the Canadian Rhodes Scholars Foundation, she returned to Oxford as Sir Christopher Cox Junior Fellow and Tutor for Women in New College. She completed a doctorate (DPhil) in 1989 for research supervised by David Albert Edwards.

== Career and research ==
Following her PhD, Etheridge held research fellowships in Oxford and Cambridge and positions at the University of California, Berkeley, The University of Edinburgh, and Queen Mary University of London before returning to Oxford in 1997.

Over the course of her career, her interests have ranged from abstract mathematical problems to concrete applications as reflected in her four books which range from a research monograph on mathematical objects called superprocesses to an exploration (co-authored with Mark H. A. Davis) of the percolation of ideas from the groundbreaking thesis of Louis Bachelier in 1900 to modern mathematical finance.

Much of her recent research is concerned with mathematical models of population genetics, where she has been particularly involved in efforts to understand the effects of spatial structure of populations on their patterns of genetic variation.

Etheridge has made significant contributions in the theory and applications of probability and in the links between them. Her particular areas of research have been in measure-valued processes (especially superprocesses and their generalisations); in theoretical population genetics; and in mathematical ecology. A recent focus has been on the genetics of spatially extended populations, where she has exploited and developed inextricable links with infinite-dimensional stochastic analysis. Her resolution of the so-called 'pain in the torus' is typical of her work in that it draws on ideas from diverse areas, from measure-valued processes to image analysis. The result is a flexible framework for modelling biological populations which, for the first time, combines ecology and genetics in a tractable way, while introducing a novel and mathematically interesting class of stochastic processes. The breadth of her contributions is further illustrated by the topics of her four books, which range from the history of financial mathematics to mathematical modelling in population genetics.

She was head of the University of Oxford's Department of Statistics, in a three-year post that ran until August 2022. She chairs the Mathematical Sciences sub-panel of the 2021 Research Excellence Framework.

== Awards and honours ==
Etheridge was elected a Fellow of the Royal Society (FRS) in 2015. and a Fellow of the Institute of Mathematical Statistics in 2016. Her citation reads:

for outstanding research on measure-valued stochastic processes and applications to population biology; and for international leadership and impressive service to the profession.

In 2017, she was elected as president of the Institute of Mathematical Statistics for a one-year term. She was awarded the Senior Anne Bennett Prize by the London Mathematical Society in 2017, and was appointed Officer of the Order of the British Empire (OBE) in the 2017 Birthday Honours for services to science. The University of Edinburgh awarded her an honorary Doctor of Science degree in 2018/19. She has served on the Engineering and Physical Sciences Research Council (EPSRC)'s Strategic Advisory Network and its Mathematical Sciences Strategic Advisory Team. She was appointed to the Council of the EPSRC in 2018.

She is a Trustee of the Royal Society and a member of its governing council. In September 2021 she became the chair of the Council for the Mathematical Sciences. In 2024 she was elected the first president of the new UK Academy for the Mathematical Sciences.

In 2023 she was elected to both the American Academy of Arts and Sciences and the National Academy of Sciences.
