= Anne Watson (mathematics educator) =

British mathematician

Anne Watson FIMA is a British mathematics educator. She is a professor emeritus in the department of education at the University of Oxford, where she was a fellow of Linacre College, Oxford. She is a Fellow of the International Society for Design and Development in Education and of the Institute for Mathematics and its Applications.

Watson was a comprehensive school teacher before becoming an academic. She has been a Quaker "off and on since the early 1980s" when she was a teacher, and belongs to the Steering Group of the Quaker Values in Education Group of the Society of Friends.

Watson has expressed opposition to plans to disallow calculators on the National Curriculum assessment, and to grade the assessment by assigning partial credit to wrong answers using traditional calculation techniques but not for wrong answers using other methods, arguing that this emphasis on rote learning "works against the flexible number sense that we would want all children to develop".

== Books ==
Watson is the co-author of:

- Inclusive Mathematics 11–18 (with M. Ollerton, Continuum, 2001)
- Mathematics as a Constructive Activity: Learners Generating Examples (with J. Mason, Erlbaum, 2005)
- Key Ideas in Teaching Mathematics: Research-based guidance for ages 9–19 (with K. Jones and D. Pratt, Oxford University Press, 2013)

With D. Rowe she is the editor of Experience and Faith in Education: essays on Quaker perspectives (Trentham Press, to appear).
