= More Maths Grads =

More Maths Grads was a three-year project run from 2007 to 2010 by a consortium of British mathematics organisations which aimed to increase the supply of mathematical sciences graduates in England and to widen participation within the mathematical sciences from groups of learners who have not previously been well represented in higher education.

== History ==
The project was launched to address a perceived problem with numbers of students studying mathematics at university - that higher education participation had increased since 2001 but numbers studying mathematical sciences remained almost constant, and had particular focus on encouraging participation from groups of learners who were not well represented in higher education. The project was initially called The Increasing the Supply of Mathematical Science Graduates programme before later being renamed More Maths Grads.

Funding of £3.3M was provided by the Higher Education Funding Council for England under the 'Strategically Important Subjects' initiative.

More Maths Grads was led by the Maths, Stats & OR Network on behalf of a consortium which also included the Institute of Mathematics and its Applications, the London Mathematical Society, the Royal Statistical Society, and HoDoMS, the Heads of Departments of Mathematical Sciences. The project concentrated its activity on three regions: West Midlands, Yorkshire & Humberside and London. It worked in collaboration with Coventry University, University of Leeds, Queen Mary, University of London and Sheffield Hallam University. It was overseen by a steering committee chaired by Duncan Lawson. The project was managed first by Helen Orr and later by Makhan Singh.

== Work areas ==
The More Maths Grads project ran four strands of activity:

- Careers theme, producing information about career opportunities with mathematics;
- Student theme, focused on enrichment activities;
- Teaching theme, professional development for teachers;
- HE Curriculum theme, research about the current higher education mathematical sciences curriculum.

The HE Curriculum theme was concerned with curriculum content and also issues around student experience and teaching practice

== Legacy ==
The conclusion of More Maths Grads after three years was marked by a Parliamentary Reception 'Where will maths take you?' on 27 January 2010, hosted by Charles Clarke MP, who claimed the project had made "an impact in improving standards of mathematics education and increasing the number continuing to study mathematics". At the event, project manager Makhan Singh claimed the project had "touched the lives of tens of thousands school students, plus many more members of the wider public" and highlighted the resources and good practice generated by the project, which included the Maths in a Box resource.

The project was followed by the National HE STEM Programme, which built on its work.
