= Zakrajšek =

Zakrajšek or Zakrajsek is a surname. Notable people with the surname include:

- Egon Zakrajšek (1941–2002), Slovene mathematician and computer scientist
- Tom Zakrajsek (born 1963), American figure skating coach
