= Egon Zakrajšek =

Slovene mathematician (1941–2002)

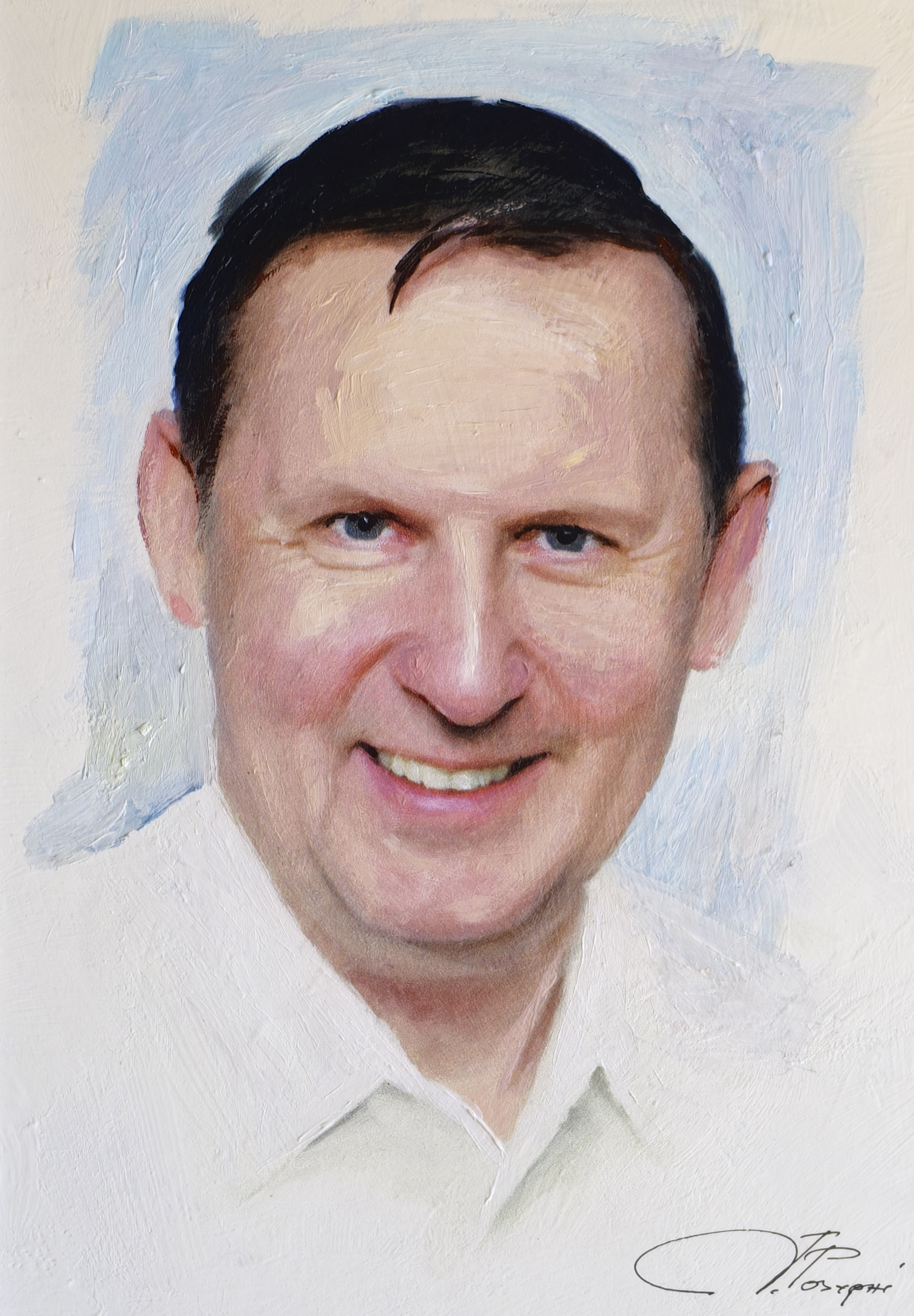
- Egon Zakrajšek
- Education: Faculty for natural sciences and technology, University of Ljubljana
- Children: Egon Zakrajšek mlajši (born 1967)
- Awards: Student Prešeren Award (1965)
- Scientific career
- Fields: mathematics; computer science
- Workplaces: Faculty for natural sciences and technology, University of Ljubljana; Institute of Mathematics, Physics and Mechanics; Cromemco
- Thesis: O invariantni vložitvi pri reševanju diferencialnih enačb (1978)
- Doctoral advisor: Zvonimir Bohte
- Notable students: Rado Flajs

Egon Zakrajšek (July 7, 1941 – September 19, 2002) was a Slovene mathematician and computer scientist.

== Life and work ==
=== Early life and education ===
Zakrajšek was born in Ljubljana, SFR Yugoslavia (today Slovenia). He became an orphan even before he started school. He went to elementary school and gymnasium in Jesenice. In 1965 he graduated from technical mathematics at the Department of mathematics and physics of the then Faculty for natural sciences and technology (FNT) of the University of Ljubljana with the diploma work Numerično računanje lastnih vrednosti nesimetričnih matrik. He received his Master's degree from the University of Zagreb for his work Numerična realizacija Ritzovega procesa and his doctorate in 1978 in Ljubljana with his dissertation O invariantni vložitvi pri reševanju diferencialnih enačb under the mentorship of Zvonimir Bohte.

=== Career ===
Zakrajšek was one of the pioneers of computer science in Slovenia and Yugoslavia. He became an expert on the first computers of the University of Ljubljana, the Zuse Z-23 and its successor the IBM 1130. In 1968, he took over the management of the Computing Center of the Institute of Mathematics, Physics and Mechanics (IMFM) in Ljubljana, and also took care of software and solved computer problems from other disciplines and from economics. In 1969, together with Janez Štalec and Konstantin Momirović, he designed and developed the SS Statistical System, which first ran on the new IBM 1130 computer at the IMFM and was in use for twenty years.

He later participated in the development of programming languages, tools and operating systems. At the same time he wrote textbooks and manuals for them: for Z-23 assembly, Algol (Algol 60, Algol 68), Fortran, Pascal, for domestic structran. In 1982 he set off for the United States and he became the manager of programming equipment at the Cromemco company. In 1994 he returned to Ljubljana, and became associate professor at the Department of Mathematics and Physics at the FNT. With his advocacy for the C language and open operating systems, that is, Unix and Linux, he helped to modernize his country in computer science. He additionally became an expert for TeX, LaTeX and MATLAB.

Beside his computer science skills he was also an mathematician. He taught about the usage of mathematics in natural and social sciences, statistics, mechanics, classical applied mathematics, discrete mathematics, graph and network theory, linear programming, operational researches, numerical analysis.

In 1965 he received Student Prešeren Award from University of Ljubljana. He was mentor to diploma works to 22 students, among them notibly Rado Flajs, Primož Jakopin, Marko Petkovšek, Tomaž Pisanski, and Tomislav Žitko. He was comentor for Rado Flajs' doctoral thesis in 2000.

His son Egon, born in 1967, is a renowned economist who worked for several years at the Fed.

== Bibliography ==
He wrote 23 original scientific articles and published them in scientific journals Acta Physica Academiae Scientiarum Hungaricae, Annales de la Societe Scientifique de Bruxelles, Chemical Physics Letters, Collegium antropologicum, Croatica chemica acta, Econometric Theory, Journal of the Institute of Mathematics and Its Applications, Kineziologija, Mathematics and Mechanics of Solids, Molecular Physics, Publications of the Department of Mathematics, The Computer Journal, Zeitschrift für Naturforschung A, and six professional articles, published in journals Radiologia Iugoslavica, and Obzornik za matematiko in fiziko.

He has written 25 university textbooks in the fields of mathematics (mathematical modeling, analysis, linear algebra, numerical methods) and computer science (Fortran, Pascal). He has also written 33 high school textbooks in the field of mathematics.

He translated James Weldon Demmel's work Applied Numerical Linear Algebra and published it in Slovene in 2000.

- ——— (1965). Numerično računanje lastnih vrednosti nesimetričnih matrik [Numerical calculation of eigenvalues of non-symmetric matrices] (diploma work). Ljubljana: University of Ljubljana. COBISS 3392857.
- Štalec, Janez; Momirović, Konstantin; ——— (1983), Statistički sistem, Zagreb: Faculty of Physical Education, University of Zagreb, COBISS 1542577
- ——— (1975). Numerična realizacija Ritzovega procesa (master's thesis). Zagreb: University of Zagreb. COBISS 8547417.
- ——— (1978). O invariantni vložitvi pri reševanju diferencialnih enačb [On invariant embedding in solving differential equations] (thesis). Ljubljana: University of Ljubljana. COBISS 6225925.
- Demmel, James Weldon (2000) [1997], Applied Numerical Linear Algebra [Uporabna numerična linearna algebra], translated by ———, Ljubljana: DMFA - založništvo, ISBN 961-212-098-6, COBISS 105226752

== Sources ==
- Golob, Tadej (2020-11-18), "Playboy intervju: Dr. Egon Zakrajšek", metropolitan.si (in Slovenian)
- Pirnat, Stanislav (2012), "Egon Zakrajšek", stanislavpirnat.si (in Slovenian)
- Velkovrh, Ciril (2013) [1986]. "Zakrajšek, Egon (1941–2002)". In Munda, Jože (ed.). Slovenski biografski leksikon (in Slovenian). Vol. 14. Ljubljana: Research Centre of the Slovenian Academy of Sciences and Arts.
- Vencelj, Marija (2002). "Umrl je prof. dr. Egon Zakrajšek" [Professor Dr. Egon Zakrajšek has died]. Obzornik za matematiko in fiziko. 49 (6): 184–186. ISSN 0473-7466.
