= Anne Glover (businesswoman) =

British venture capitalist

Dame Anne Glover DBE, HonFREng
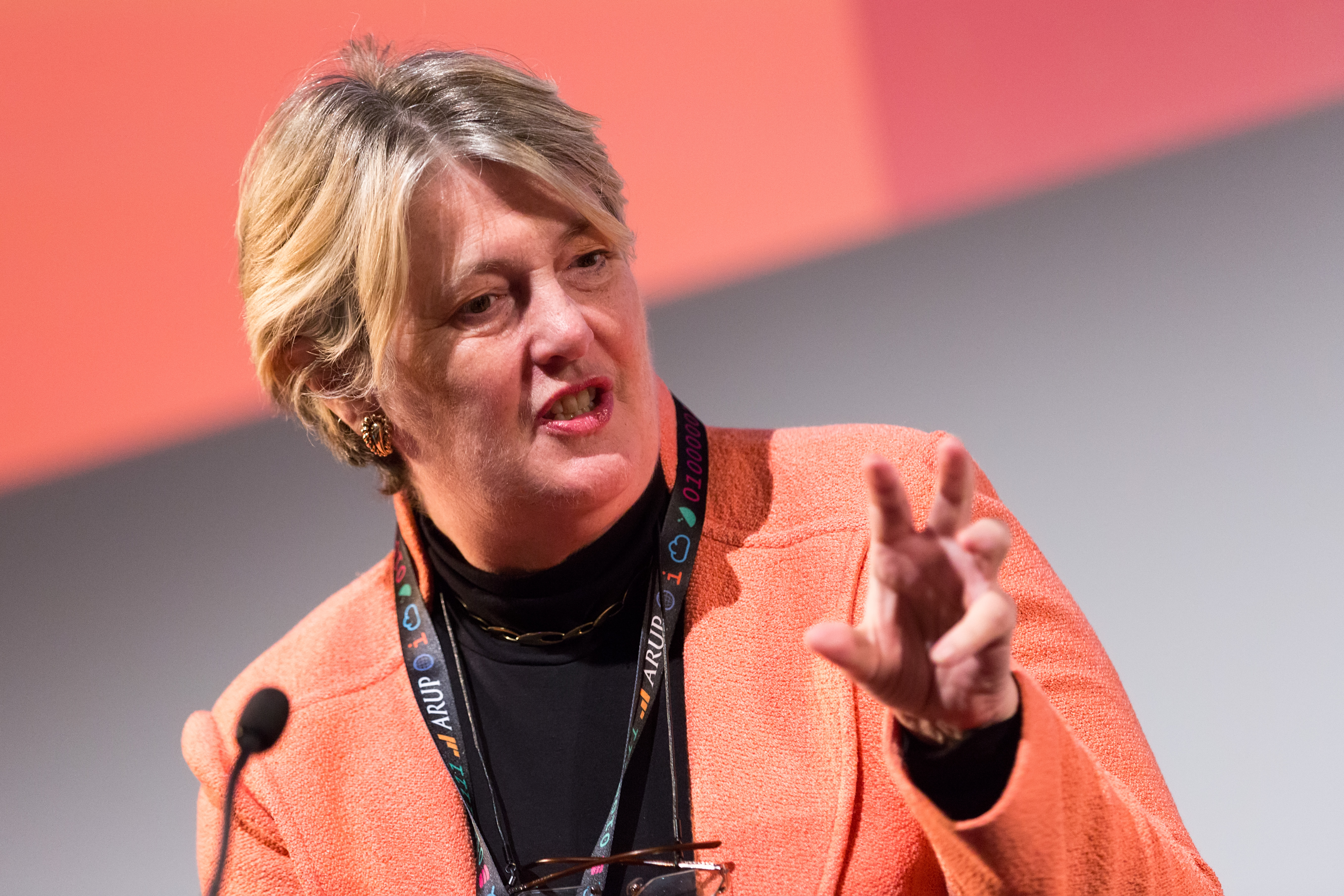
- Glover in 2014
- Born: Anne Margaret Glover; 6 February 1954 (age 72)
- Education: Clare College, Cambridge; Yale School of Management

Dame Anne Margaret Glover (born 6 February 1954) DBE, HonFREng is CEO and co-founder of Amadeus Capital Partners, a venture capital firm that invests in European high-technology companies.

== Career ==
Prior to founding Amadeus in 1997, she was with Apax Partners, where she was a member of the investment team. She has been a business angel, investing in UK-based information technology start-ups. Glover worked for Virtuality Group plc, where she was COO of the virtual reality peripherals company.

Glover was a manager and consultant with Bain & Company in Boston for five years. Earlier in her career, she worked for Cummins Engine.

She was chair of the British Venture Capital Association (BVCA), which represents approximately 165 UK-based private equity and venture capital firms. She is on the Technology Strategy Board of the UK's Department of Trade and Industry.

== Education ==
Glover earned a master's degree in management from Yale School of Management and a master's degree in metallurgy and materials science from Clare College, Cambridge.

== Honours/Awards ==
Glover was appointed a Commander of the Order of British Empire (CBE) in the 2006 Birthday Honours, "for services to business" and was elected an Honorary Fellow of the Royal Academy of Engineering in 2008.

She was elected Chair of the European Private Equity and Venture Capital Association (now Invest Europe) in June 2014.

Glover, along with Dame Dervilla Mitchell, Professor Sarah Harper, Professor Dame Fiona Murray and Professor Philip Bond, was appointed to the Council for Science and Technology in March 2014.

In June 2018, Glover was appointed as a Non-Executive Director in the Court of Directors of the Bank of England. She was elected a Fellow of the Royal Society of Edinburgh in 2021.
