= Paul Glaister =

British mathematician

Paul Glaister CBE is a British mathematician, the UK representative to the International Commission on Mathematical Instruction, the President of the 153 year old Mathematical Association and former Chair of the Joint Mathematical Council (JMC) of the United Kingdom, a body which set up the Advisory Committee on Mathematics Education along with the Royal Society, and comprises 31 bodies representing mathematics education in the UK; an External Expert for Ofqual and for the Standards and Testing Agency within the Department for Education; Honorary Secretary and a Council member of the Institute of Mathematics and its Applications; and works closely with the Education Development Trust in a number of areas in mathematics education. He is a professor of Mathematics and Mathematics Education in the Department of Mathematics and Statistics at the University of Reading. His contributions have been across the areas of computational fluid dynamics, numerical analysis, applied mathematics, mathematics education, and science education. In 2026 he was appointed as one of the 100 inaugural and founding Fellows of the Academy for the Mathematical Sciences and was awarded the Institute of Mathematics and its Applications David Youdan Medal

Glaister was appointed Commander of the Order of the British Empire (CBE) in the 2023 New Year Honours for services to education.
