= Duncan Lawson =

British mathematician

Duncan Lawson MBE CMath FIMA
- Born: Duncan Austin Lawson
- Education: University of Oxford
- Employers: British Gas plc; Newman University; Coventry University; Higher Education Academy
- Lawson's voice recorded in July 2019
- Website: www.coventry.ac.uk/research/research-people/duncan-lawson/

Duncan Austin Lawson MBE CMath FIMA is a British mathematician known for work in mathematics education including university-wide mathematics and statistics support.

== Early life and education ==
Lawson attended Bury Grammar School and later obtained a BA and D.Phil. from the University of Oxford.

== Career ==
Lawson worked for British Gas plc before moving to Coventry University in 1987. His research interests are in efficient computational methods for the calculation of thermal radiative heat transfer.

From 2005 to 2010 Lawson with Tony Croft established the sigma Centre for Excellence in University-wide mathematics and statistics support, which was awarded the 2011 Times Higher Education Award for Outstanding Support for Students. The centre later developed under the National HE STEM Programme into the sigma Network for Excellence in Mathematics and Statistics Support.

Lawson was awarded National Teaching Fellowship in 2005. Lawson also acted as Assistant Chief Executive of the Higher Education Academy from 2012-13.

Lawson was professor and associate dean of the faculty of science and engineering at Coventry University (2002–13), director of the Maths, Stats & OR Network of the Higher Education Academy (2005-9), and chair of the executive group of the More Maths Grads project (2008–10).

From 2013-18, Lawson was pro-vice-chancellor of formative education at Newman University in Birmingham, before returning to Coventry.

Lawson received the Institute of Mathematics and its Applications' Gold Medal in 2016 jointly with Croft for "an outstanding contribution to the improvement of the teaching of mathematics" by establishing Sigma.

Lawson was appointed Member of the Order of the British Empire (MBE) in the 2019 Birthday Honours for services to mathematics in higher education.

Lawson is currently director of the sigma maths support centre at Coventry University.
