= Clive Neal-Sturgess =

British mechanical engineer

- Citizenship: British
- Education: Lanchester College; University of Birmingham
- Known for: Peak Virtual Power (PVP); injury biomechanics
- Scientific career
- Fields: Mechanical engineering; automotive safety; injury biomechanics
- Workplaces: University of Birmingham; Coventry University

Clive Neal-Sturgess is a British mechanical engineer, academic, and specialist in automotive safety and injury biomechanics. He is emeritus Professor of Mechanical Engineering at the University of Birmingham and visiting professor of Automotive Safety at Coventry University. His work has focused on the application of finite element modelling, continuum damage mechanics, and thermodynamic measures of injury to the analysis of vehicle crashes and pedestrian impacts.

== Early life and education ==
Clive Neal-Sturgess was educated at King Edward VI Grammar School in Nuneaton. He began his technical training as a Student Apprentice at Clarkson International, a programme now equivalent to contemporary degree apprenticeships. He subsequently enrolled at Lanchester College, Coventry, graduating with a First Class Honours degree in Production Engineering. He then undertook doctoral studies at the University of Birmingham, completing a PhD on the forming behaviour of tool steels, which laid the foundations for his later work on material response, damage evolution, and impact mechanics.

== Academic career ==
Neal-Sturgess joined the University of Birmingham as a lecturer and progressed through senior academic ranks, ultimately holding the prestigious Jaguar Chair of Automotive Engineering from 1988 to 2004. During this period he also served as Head of the Department of Mechanical Engineering, overseeing significant developments in curriculum, research capacity, and automotive industry partnerships. He directed the university's Automotive Safety Centre for fifteen years, leading multidisciplinary investigations into real-world collisions and the biomechanics of serious and fatal injuries. His academic career spans more than five decades, during which he has published over 220 works, including three books, and acquired more than 1,700 citations and 35,000 reads.

Following retirement, he became emeritus Professor at Birmingham and accepted a visiting appointment at Coventry University, where he continues to contribute to research and postgraduate supervision.

== Research ==
Neal-Sturgess's research has centred on finite element methods (FEM), continuum damage mechanics (CDM), co-evolutionary modelling, and impact trauma analysis. His most influential contribution is the development and application of the Peak Virtual Power (PVP) criterion. PVP and related organ trauma models (OTMs) have been applied to both experimental and computational crash scenarios, enabling more accurate prediction of injuries consistent with the Abbreviated Injury Scale (AIS). During his tenure as Director of the Automotive Safety Centre, he oversaw the investigation of approximately 7,500 fatal or serious-injury (KSI) cases and secured more than £6.7 million in competitive research funding from bodies including the European Union and the EPSRC. He has also served on the editorial boards of three academic journals. He has contributed to international debates on injury metrics, crashworthiness, and transport safety.

== Professional service ==
Neal-Sturgess is a long-standing member of the Parliamentary Advisory Council for Transport Safety (PACTS), contributing expert evidence and technical advice on road safety policy. Within the engineering profession, he serves as Chairman of the Academics in Mechanical Engineering (AiME) Sectoral Group of the Engineering Professors' Council and is also Chairman of the Midlands Centre of the Automobile Division of the Institution of Mechanical Engineers (IMechE).

Beyond academia, he is Clerk and Trustee of the Newport's School Foundation, a major educational charity regulated by the UK Charities Commission.

== Honours and affiliations ==
- Chartered Engineer (CEng)
- Chartered Physicist (CPhys)
- Fellow of the Institution of Mechanical Engineers (FIMechE)
- Fellow of the Institute of Materials, Minerals and Mining (FIM3)
- Fellow of the Higher Education Academy (FHEA)
- Fellow of the University of Birmingham (FUoB)
- Member of the Institute of Physics (MInstP)
- Fellow of the Royal Society of Arts (FRSA)

== Selected publications ==
- Bastien, C.; Neal-Sturgess, C.; Christensen, J.; Wen, L. (2019). "A Deterministic Method to Calculate the AIS Trauma Score from a Finite Element Organ Trauma Model (OTM)". arXiv:1904.00919 [q-bio.TO].
- Bastien, Christophe; Neal-Sturgess, Clive; Davies, Huw (2020). "A Generic Trauma Severity Computer Method Applied to Pedestrian Collisions". arXiv:2011.00829 [q-bio.TO].
- Bastien, Christophe; Neal-Sturgess, Clive; Davies, Huw; Cheng, Xiang (2020). "Computing Brain White and Grey Matter Injury Severity in a Traumatic Fall". Mathematical and Computational Applications. 25 (3): 61. doi:10.3390/mca25030061.
- Neal-Sturgess, C. E. (2002). "A thermomechanical theory of impact trauma". Proceedings of the Institution of Mechanical Engineers, Part D: Journal of Automobile Engineering. 216 (11): 883–895. doi:10.1243/095440702321031432.
- Neal-Sturgess, Clive (2010). "The Entropy of Morbidity Trauma and Mortality". arXiv:1008.3695 [physics.med-ph].
