= Glenda Lappan =

American mathematician

Glenda T. Lappan (born 1939) is a professor emerita of mathematics at Michigan State University. She is known for her work in mathematics education and in particular for developing the widely used Connected Mathematics curriculum for middle school mathematics in the US.

== Education and career ==
Lappan grew up as an only child on a farm in southern Georgia. She did her undergraduate studies at Mercer University, graduating in 1961, and taught at the high school level in Georgia before completing a doctorate at the University of Georgia in 1965. She taught at Michigan State for 50 years, from 1965 until her retirement in 2015.

From 1986 to 1991, Lappan directed the middle school portion of a project by the National Council of Teachers of Mathematics to set curriculum and evaluation standards for mathematics. Following that work, she began the Connected Mathematics Project, initially envisioned as a five-year effort to implement the NCTM standards. She served as president of the NCTM from 1998 to 2000, and later as chair of the Mathematical Sciences Education Board of the National Academy of Sciences.

== Awards and honors ==
In 1996 the Association for Women in Mathematics gave her their Louise Hay Award. She was named a University Distinguished Professor at Michigan State in 1998. In 2002, the Connected Mathematics project endowed the Lappan-Phillips-Fitzgerald Endowed Chair in Mathematics Education at Michigan State, named after Lappan and the other two founders of the project. The National Council of Teachers of Mathematics gave her a lifetime achievement award in 2004. In 2008 she and Elizabeth Phillips shared the International Society for Design and Development in Education Prize for Excellence in Educational Design for their work on Connected Mathematics. She was inducted into the Michigan Women's Hall of Fame in 2009.
