= Smestow =

Smestow may refer to:

- Smestow Academy, a school in Wolverhampton, England
- Smestow Valley Leisure Ride
- Smestow Brook, a tributary of the River Stour
