= Emma McCoy =

British mathematician & academic

Emma McCoy FRSS FIMA
- Born: Emma Joan McCoy
- Education: University of Bath (MSc); Imperial College London (PhD)
- Known for: Mathematics
- Scientific career
- Workplaces: Imperial College London
- Thesis: Some new statistical approaches to the analysis of long memory processes (1995)
- Website: imperial.ac.uk/people/e.mccoy

Emma Joan McCoy FRSS FIMA is the Vice President and Pro-Vice Chancellor for Education and a Professor of Statistics at the London School of Economics and Political Science. She has acted as a mathematics subject expert for discussions on reform of the National Curriculum, and has been a member of the Royal Statistical Society council, and of the Royal Society Advisory Committee on Mathematics Education.

== Education ==
McCoy completed a PhD at Imperial College London in 1995 and a Master of Science degree in Computational Statistics in 1991 at the University of Bath. McCoy's PhD focused on the analysis and synthesis of long-memory processes. In particular, she investigated the use of the discrete wavelet transform and multitaper spectral estimation. She completed her thesis, Some New Statistical Approaches to the Analysis of Long Memory Processes, under the supervision of Andrew Walden.

== Research and career ==
McCoy is interested in time series analysis and causal inference, with a particular focus on transport. Prior to joining LSE in October 2022, she was the Vice-Provost (Education and Student Experience) at Imperial College London, where she was appointed Professor of Statistics in 2014. McCoy previously taught several undergraduate courses at Imperial, as well as being an advisor for the EPSRC funded Mathematics of Planet Earth doctoral training centre.

She has given several public talks related to her research, and real world applications, like Inference Challenges in Transportation. In 2006 she delivered the London Mathematical Society popular lecture, From Magic Squares to Sudoku. She has been involved with the Royal Institution mathematics masterclasses since they started being held at Imperial College London. She is concerned about the future of mathematics education in the UK, and is a past member of the Royal Society Advisory Committee of Mathematics Education. McCoy established a joint Mathematics with Education BSc at Imperial College, which was delivered jointly by Imperial College London and Canterbury Christ Church University.

McCoy is a Fellow of the Institute of Mathematics and its Applications and the Royal Statistical Society. She has also been a member of the Royal Statistical Society's Council and the Academic Affairs Advisory group. In 2017 she was appointed Vice-Dean for Education for the Faculty of Natural Sciences at Imperial College London. McCoy was appointed as Pro-Director (Education) at LSE in 2022.

McCoy was the first female professor of maths at Imperial College London. She was the mathematical advisor to the maths and computing section of the Suffrage Science scheme, which celebrates women in science for their scientific achievement and for their ability to inspire others. Suffrage Science was established in 2011 by the MRC Clinical Sciences Centre. In 2017 she received an award from the London Institute of Medical Sciences for establishing a Maths and Computing Group.
