= Syncron =

Syncron may refer to:

- Syncron - software company
- Syncron - video game
