= Aris Syntetos =

Professor of Business and Management

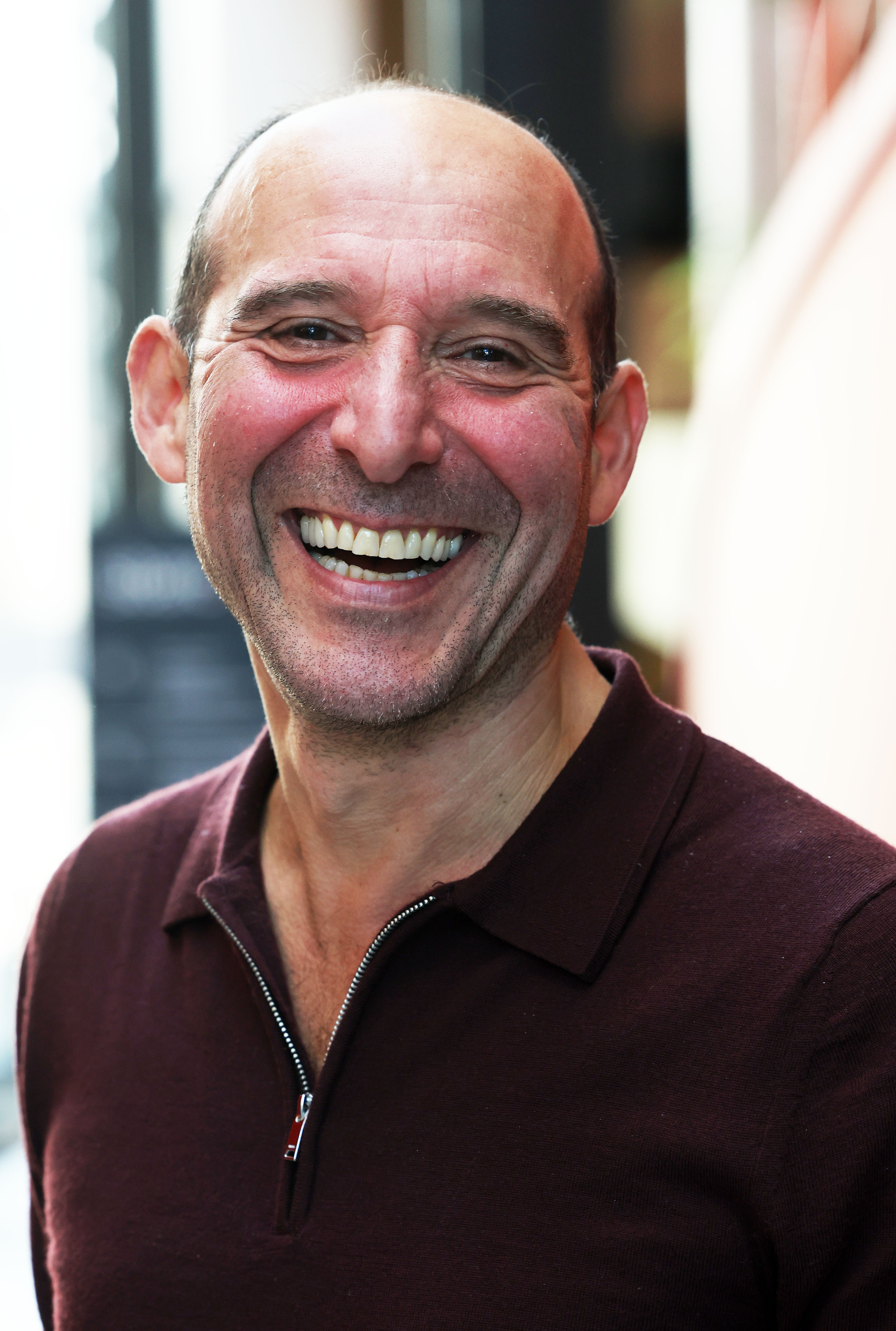
- Syntetos in 2023
- Occupation: Research Professor of Business

Academic background
- Education: Brunel University of London

Academic work
- Discipline: Management Mathematics and Operations Management
- Institutions: Cardiff University, University of Salford

Aris A. Syntetos ^{FAcadMathSci} is a Greek-British Business Professor and Management thinker. He is Distinguished Research Professor of Decision Science and the DSV Chair of Logistics at Cardiff Business School, Cardiff University.

He is an expert on the interface between Mathematics and Operations Management, and specializes in forecasting particularly in the context of inventory systems and logistics operations. His research has been highly cited, and features in best-selling software packages. His work has had an enormous financial and environmental impact.

He is editor in chief of the IMA Journal of Management Mathematics (IMAMAN) published by Oxford University Press, and he was appointed in the first cohort of Fellows of the Academy for the Mathematical Sciences.

== Education ==
Syntetos completed his undergraduate studies in Business Administration at the University of Piraeus, Greece, in 1993. He later obtained a Postgraduate Diploma in Quality and Statistical Control through a European Union (Socrates) programme (1994), followed by an MSc in Quality Management from the University of Stirling, United Kingdom (1996). He earned his PhD in Operational Research and Mathematical Statistics from Brunel University (2001) via a double scholarship from the University and Syncron. The title of his thesis was ‘Forecasting of intermittent demand’ and was supervised by Professor John Boylan. He completed his Military Service as a Greek National 2001-03.

== Career and research ==
Syntetos began his academic career at the University of Salford, where he was affiliated with the Centre for Operational Research and Applied Statistics (CORAS). He later held visiting academic appointments at Copenhagen Business School, including the Otto Monsted Guest Professorship in the Department of Operations, and KEDGE Business School, France.

He joined Cardiff Business School, Cardiff University, in 2012, where he was appointed Professor of Operational Research and Operations Management, and later Distinguished Research Professor of Decision Science. He holds an endowed Chair, the DSV Chair of Logistics Research and is co-founder (with Mike Wilson of DSV) and Director of the PARC Institute of Manufacturing, Logistics and Inventory, a university-industry research partnership focused on fundamental and applied research in logistics, manufacturing, and inventory optimisation and management. He is also the Director of Cardiff University’s flagship circular economy centre, RemakerSpace. In 2023 he established with Mike Wilson the university's strategic partnership with DSV, one of the world's largest third-party logistics provider. With John Boylan, Professor Syntetos published Intermittent Demand Forecasting: Context, methods and applications with Wiley in 2021.

His research has received multi-million funding from governments (Engineering and Physical Sciences Research Council (EPSRC), Innovate UK, Welsh Government) and industry, including one of the first fundamental investigations of forecasting and uncertainty handling in circular economy from the EPSRC in 2017 for a grant to support the project ‘Resilient Remanufacturing Networks: Forecasting, Informatics and Holons’.

His close industry collaborations include British Telecommunications, Brother Industries, DSV, the Efficient Consumer Response (ECR) Europe network, and Ocado.

He is principally known for developing:

● the Syntetos–Boylan Approximation (SBA), a benchmark method for forecasting intermittent demand

● the Syntetos–Boylan–Croston approach (SBC) approach to demand classification, a framework for classifying demand patterns to support forecasting and inventory decisions.

Syntetos has been credited with integrating forecasting methods with inventory optimisation, two areas that were traditionally treated separately within the academic literature and software packages.

== Editorial and professional service ==
Syntetos is Editor-in-Chief of the IMA Journal of Management Mathematics, published by Oxford University Press. He also serves as an Associate Editor of FORESIGHT, the practitioner-oriented journal of the International Institute of Forecasters.

He served as a Director of the International Institute of Forecasters from 2014 to 2022 and currently serves as Vice-President of the International Society for Inventories Research.

== Awards and honours ==
Syntetos has received multiple awards for teaching, supervision, and research impact, including:

● Outstanding Doctoral Supervisor Award (2016)

● Innovation and Impact Award in Business (2016 and 2019)

In 2024, he was a co-recipient of the Goodeve Medal from the Operational Research Society. In 2026, he was elected as a founding Fellow of the Academy for the Mathematical Sciences.

== Bibliography ==
- Syntetos, A. A. et al., 2016. 'Supply chain forecasting: theory, practice, their gap and the future'. European Journal of Operational Research 252 (1), pp. 1–26. (10.1016/j.ejor.2015.11.010)
- Babai, M. Z., Syntetos, A. A., and Teunter, R. H. 2026. 'Fifty years of inventory research from a forecasting perspective'. European Journal of Operational Research 331 (1), pp. 1–20. (10.1016/j.ejor.2025.07.003)
- Boylan, J. E., and Syntetos, A. ( 2021) Intermittent demand forecasting: Context, methods and applications. Wiley
