= Kaye Stacey =

Australian mathematics educator

Kaye C. Vale Stacey (born 1948) is an Australian mathematics educator who held the Foundation Chair of Mathematics Education in the Graduate School of Education at the University of Melbourne for 20 years, from 1992 until her retirement in 2012. She is the editor-in-chief of Educational Designer, the journal of the International Society for Design and Development in Education.

Stacey has a bachelor's degree from the University of New South Wales. She earned a doctorate (D.Phil.) at the University of Oxford in 1974. Her dissertation The Enumeration of Perfect Quadratic Forms in Seven Variables concerned number theory and was supervised by Bryan John Birch. She also has a Diploma of Education from Monash University.

With Leone Burton and John Mason, Stacey is the author of the book Thinking Mathematically (Addison-Wesley, 1982; 2nd ed., Pearson, 2010).

In 2003, the Australian Government gave Stacey a Centenary Medal for outstanding services to mathematics education. She was appointed a Member of the Order of Australia in the 2026 King's Birthday Honours in recognition of her " significant service to tertiary and secondary education, and to mathematics".
