= John McWhirter (mathematician) =

British mathematician and engineer

Professor John McWhirter FRS FREng FIMA FInstP FIEE FLSW

Distinguished Research Professor in Engineering, Cardiff University
- In office 2007–2019

Personal details
- Born: John Graham McWhirter; 28 March 1949 (age 77) Northern Ireland

See John McWhirter (disambiguation) for other people of the same name.

John Graham McWhirter (born 28 March 1949) is a British mathematician and engineer in the field of signal processing.

John McWhirter attended Newry High School. He graduated in mathematics from Queen's University Belfast in 1970, and did his PhD there in 1973 on "The Virial Theorem in Collision Theory" under Benjamin Moiseiwitsch. He started working in the Signal Processing Group at the Royal Signals and Radar Establishment, Great Malvern, in the late 1970s, and has worked there for RSRE's successor organisations, currently QinetiQ. McWhirter left QinetiQ on 31 August 2007 to take up his current post as Distinguished Research Professor in Engineering at Cardiff University.

His work has mainly been in military areas including radar, sonar and communications, recently branching into civil applications. A particular interest is "blind" signal detection in which one does not know whether a signal is present, or its nature.

== Awards and honours ==
- 1986 honorary visiting professor at Queen's University Belfast
- 1988 visiting professor at Cardiff University
- 1996 Elected as a Fellow of the Royal Academy of Engineering (FREng)
- 1999 Elected as a Fellow of the Royal Society.
- 2000 Honorary Doctorate from the Queen's University Belfast
- 2002 Honorary Doctorate from the University of Edinburgh
- 2003 EURASIP European Group Technical Achievement Award

He is also a Fellow of the Institute of Physics. He is a Fellow of the Institute of Mathematics and its Applications (IMA) and in 2002/3 its president. He is also a Founding Fellow of the Learned Society of Wales.

== Selected papers ==
- On the numerical inversion of the Laplace transform and similar Fredholm integral equations of the first kind, J G McWhirter and E R Pike, J. Phys. A: Math. Gen. 11 1729–1745 (1978) doi:10.1088/0305-4470/11/9/007
- Some systolic array developments in the United Kingdom, John V. McCanny and John G. McWhirter, Computer Volume 20, Issue 7 p. 51 (1987)
