= British Society for Research into Learning Mathematics =

- Abbreviation: BSRLM
- Formation: January 1985
- Purpose: Mathematics education in the United Kingdom
- Region served: UK
- Members: Mathematics educators
- Website: BSRLM

The British Society for Research into Learning Mathematics is a United Kingdom association for people interested in research in mathematics education.

== Purpose ==
BSRLM organises the Special Interest Group (SIG) on mathematics education for the British Educational Research Association (BERA). It is a participating society of the Joint Mathematical Council (JMC), and has close connections with teacher associations through British Congress for Mathematics Education (BCME).

=== Events ===
BSRLM organises a day conference each academic term (three times each year) where members present reports of recently completed studies, work in progress or more speculative thinking. There are also on-going workshops run on a collaborative basis to investigate issues in different areas of interest. The summer meeting is usually preceded by a new researchers’ day and the autumn meeting includes an AGM. Many members of BSRLM are also involved in the Congress of the European Society for Research in Mathematics Education (CERME), the International Group for the Psychology of Mathematics Education (IGPME) and other international research organisations.

=== Publications ===
- Proceedings of meetings of the Society are available online several weeks after each day conference.
- A peer reviewed journal, Research in Mathematics Education (RME) published by Taylor and Francis three times a year. Each year the Janet Duffin Award is made to the author or authors judged to making the most outstanding contribution to the journal.

== Structure ==
The membership of BSRLM is made up mostly of researchers, students, teachers and education advisors. BSRLM is run by an elected executive committee of nine members. The current chair is Professor Jeremy Hodgen (University College London).

== Origins of BSRLM ==
In the late 1960s and early 1970s there was a number of teacher trainers and university lecturers in the UK, principally teaching mathematics and psychology, who became involved in research in the learning and teaching of mathematics, and in the movement to establish mathematics education as an academic discipline. Two groups who were meeting during this period were the Psychology of Mathematics Education Workshop, principally in London, and the British Society for the Psychology of Learning Mathematics, in locations in the Midlands. Since many individuals attended both of these groups, they eventually came together as BSRLM in January 1985.
