= IMA Lighthill-Thwaites Prize =

The Lighthill-Thwaites Prize of the Institute of Mathematics and its Applications (IMA), in cooperation with the Institute's Journal of Applied Mathematics and the British Applied Mathematics Colloquium (BAMC), is a biennial prize established in 2011 by the IMA in honour of the achievement of its first two Presidents – Professors Sir James Lighthill and Sir Bryan Thwaites. The prize honours young applied mathematicians (of any nationality), and applicants submit papers for review. A committee reviews the papers, invites shortlisted candidates to give lectures at the Lighthill-Thwaites meeting, and then awards a First Prize.

== Prize winners ==
Source: https://ima.org.uk/awards-medals/ima-lighthill-thwaites-prize/

- 2011 – Raphael Assier
- 2013 – Laura Kimpton
- 2015 – John Craske
- 2017 – Doireann O’Kiely
- 2019 – Matthew Butler
- 2021 – Matthew Colbrook
- 2023 – Clare Rees-Zimmerman

== Finalists ==
Source: https://ima.org.uk/awards-medals/ima-lighthill-thwaites-prize/

- 2011 – Igor Chernyavsky, S. Lind, A. Stewart, Alice Thompson
- 2013 – Thomas Woolley, M. Moore, Matthew Hennessy
- 2015 – Jonathan Black, Susana Gomes, Lorna Ayton
- 2017 – Nabil Fadai, Oliver Allanson, Z. Wilmott
- 2019 – Matthew Colbrook, Maximilian Eggl, Linnea Franssen, Matthew Nethercote, Jessica Williams
- 2021 – Daniel Hill, Eleanor Johnstone, Kristian Kiradjiev, Ellen Luckins, Joshua Moore

== See also ==
- List of mathematics awards
