= Veronica Bowman =

British statistician

Veronica Elizabeth (Ronni) Bowman OBE FIMA FRSS is a British military statistician specialising in Bayesian inference and uncertainty, and their applications in knowledge management for chemical, biological and radiological threats. She is a professor and data science fellow at the Defence Science and Technology Laboratory, and an associate member of the Southampton Statistical Sciences Research Institute at the University of Southampton.

== Education ==
Bowman was a mathematics student at the University of Southampton, where she earned a BSc with first class honours before completing a doctorate in statistical modelling.

== Recognition ==
Bowman is a Fellow of the Royal Statistical Society and of the Institute of Mathematics and its Applications.

Bowman was the 2021 winner of the Innovation and Creativity Award at the Women in Defence UK Awards. In the 2022 New Year Honours, Bowman was named as an Officer of the Order of the British Empire, for her work developing CrystalCast, a system for uncertainty analysis and Bayesian model combination that was applied to combine academic and government epidemiological predictions in the COVID-19 pandemic in order to provide an estimate for the basic reproduction number of the disease.
