= Lynne McClure =

British mathematics educator

Catherine Lynne McClure OBE (born 1952) is a British mathematics educator. From 2014 to 2022 she was director of Cambridge Mathematics, a program at the University of Cambridge that spans the university's mathematics and education faculties, Cambridge Assessment, and the Cambridge University Press, and is aimed at developing a flexible tool to inform new mathematics curricula for primary and secondary mathematics education. Between 2022 and 2024 she was Head of Mathematics Solutions within the Cambridge Partnership for Education at the University of Cambridge.

== Education and career ==
McClure has a psychology degree from University College London, a Postgraduate Certificate in Education from the University of Oxford, and Masters degrees from both the Open University and the University of Cambridge. McClure has taught in secondary schools and as a head teacher in primary, before moving into teacher education. She became principal lecturer in education at Oxford Brookes University and then at the University of Edinburgh, during which time she ran her own international education consultancy. Whilst at Cambridge, she directed the NRICH and Underground Maths Projects before being appointed to direct Cambridge Mathematics.

McClure was appointed Officer of the Order of the British Empire (OBE) in the 2022 New Year Honours for services to education.

== Service ==
McClure was president of the Mathematical Association for 2014–2015, and executive chair of the International Society for Design and Development in Education for 2017–2019. She has served twice on the Advisory Committee on Mathematics Education, and is now serving again in an ex-officio role. She was chair of the Strategic Board of the Cambridgeshire Maths Hub and is chair of the Local Governing Board of the Cambridge University Maths School. She is a trustee of National Numeracy and the Cambridge Philharmonic, is soon to be chair of trustees of MathsWorldUK and chairs the Education workstream of the Academy for the Mathematical Sciences. McClure is Parish Councillor for the village of Bourn.

== Publications ==
- Meeting the needs of your most able pupils : mathematics, 2006
- Maths problem solving, 2008
