= Jennifer Scott (mathematician) =

British mathematician

Jennifer Ann Scott FIMA (née Dixon, born 1960) is a British mathematician specialising in numerical analysis, sparse matrix computations, and parallel computing. She is a professor of applied mathematics at the University of Reading, where she directs the Centre for the Mathematics of Planet Earth, and a Group Leader and Individual Merit Research Fellow for the Science and Technology Facilities Council at the Rutherford Appleton Laboratory.

== Education and career ==
Scott earned a D.Phil. from the University of Oxford in 1984; her dissertation was A unified analysis of discretisation methods and was supervised by J. Sean McKee. She worked as a junior research fellow in St. John's College, Oxford, and then at the National Radiological Protection Board, becoming a finalist for the Leslie Fox Prize for Numerical Analysis in 1986. Iain S. Duff recruited her to join the Harwell Laboratory (now part of the Rutherford Appleton Laboratory) in 1987. She became a professor at Reading in 2016.

== Recognition ==
Scott is a Fellow of the Institute of Mathematics and its Applications. She was named a SIAM Fellow in the 2021 class of fellows, "for contributions to sparse matrix algorithms and software".
