= Grigory Barenblatt =

Russian mathematician (1927–2018)

- Григо́рий Исаа́кович Баренблатт
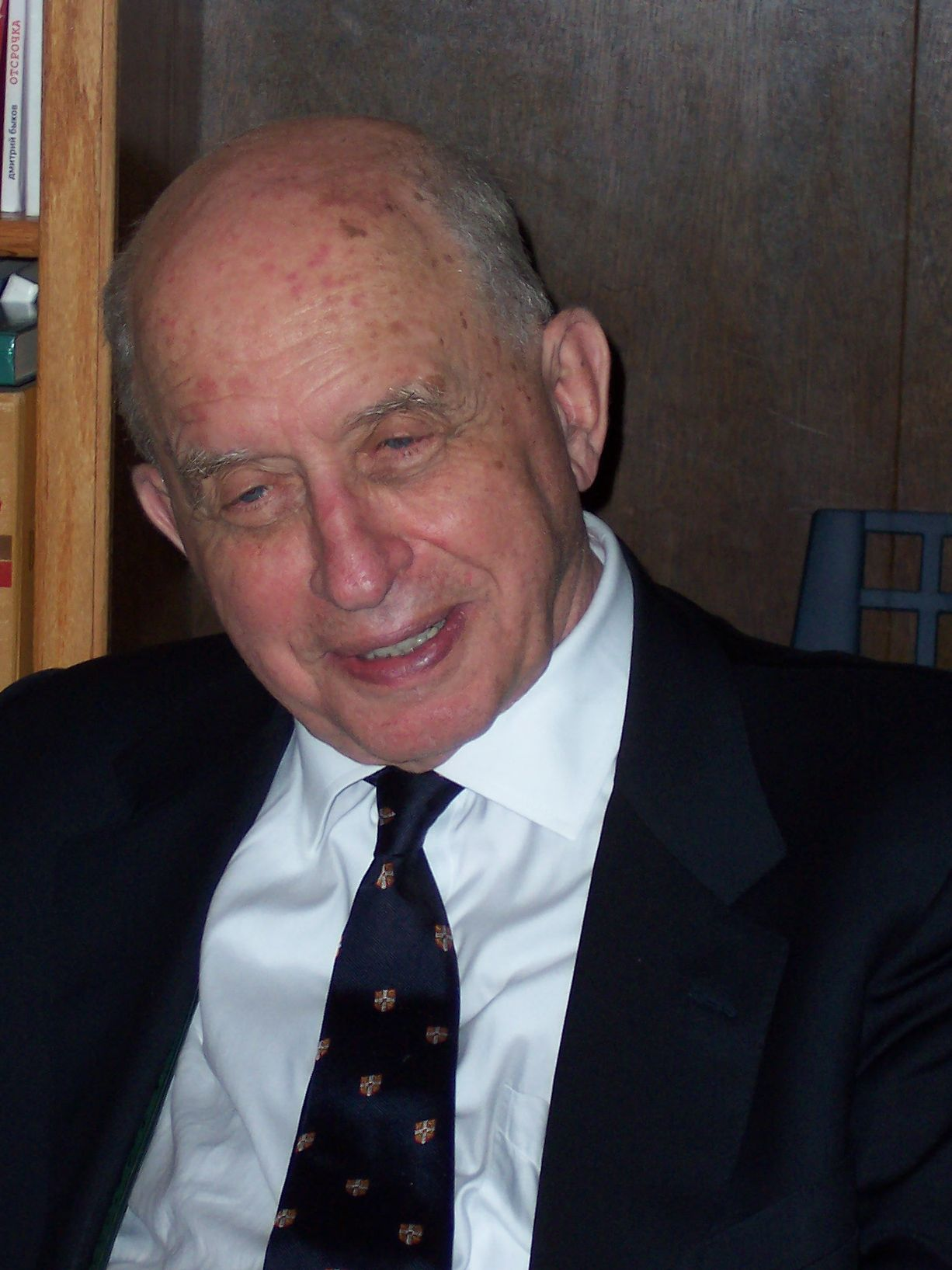
- Born: July 10, 1927; Moscow, Russian SSR, Soviet Union
- Died: June 22, 2018 (aged 90)
- Education: Moscow State University (Ph.D)
- Awards: Lagrange Medal (1995), G. I. Taylor Medal (1999), Timoshenko Medal (2005)
- Scientific career
- Fields: Mathematics
- Workplaces: Shirshov Institute of Oceanology, Russian Academy of Sciences. University of California, Berkeley
- Thesis: On the Motion of Suspended Particles in a Turbulent Flow (1953)
- Doctoral advisor: Andrey Kolmogorov; Boris Levitan

Grigory Isaakovich Barenblatt (Russian: Григо́рий Исаа́кович Баренблат; 10 July 1927 – 22 June 2018) was a Russian mathematician.

== Education ==
Barenblatt graduated in 1950 from Moscow State University, Department of Mechanics and Mathematics. He received his Ph.D. in 1953 from Moscow State University under the supervision of A. N. Kolmogorov.

== Career and research ==
Barenblatt also received a D.Sc. from Moscow State University in 1957. He was an emeritus Professor in Residence at the Department of Mathematics of the University of California, Berkeley and Mathematician at Department of Mathematics, Lawrence Berkeley National Laboratory. He was G. I. Taylor Professor of Fluid Mechanics at the University of Cambridge from 1992 to 1994 and he was Emeritus G. I. Taylor Professor of Fluid Mechanics. His areas of research were:

1. Fracture mechanics
2. The theory of fluid and gas flows in porous media
3. The mechanics of a non-classical deformable solids
4. Turbulence
5. Self-similarities, nonlinear waves and intermediate asymptotics.

== Family ==
- His mother was Nadezhda Veniaminovna Kagan (1900–1938), a microbiologist and virologist who worked on tick-borne encephalitis.
- His father was Isaak Grigoryevich Barenblat, a well-known Moscow endocrinologist and co-author of the two-volume Therapeutic Handbook, which was reprinted several times between 1937 and 1946.
- His younger maternal half-brother was mathematician Yakov Grigoryevich Sinai.

== Awards and honors ==
- 1975 – Foreign Honorary Member, American Academy of Arts and Sciences
- 1984 – Foreign Member, Danish Center of Applied Mathematics & Mechanics
- 1988 – Foreign Member, Polish Society of Theoretical & Applied Mechanics
- 1989 – Doctor of Technology Honoris Causa at the Royal Institute of Technology, Stockholm, Sweden
- 1992 – Foreign Associate, U.S. National Academy of Engineering
- 1993 – Fellow, Cambridge Philosophical Society
- 1993 – Member, Academia Europaea
- 1994 – Fellow, Gonville and Caius College, Cambridge; (since 1999, Honorary Fellow)
- 1995 – Lagrange Medal, Accademia Nazionale dei Lincei
- 1995 – Modesto Panetti Prize and Medal
- 1996 - Visiting Miller Professorship - University of California Berkeley
- 1997 – Foreign Associate, U.S. National Academy of Sciences
- 1999 – G. I. Taylor Medal, U.S. Society of Engineering Science
- 1999 – J. C. Maxwell Medal and Prize, International Congress for Industrial and Applied Mathematics
- 2000 – Foreign Member, Royal Society of London
- 2005 – Timoshenko Medal, American Society of Mechanical Engineers, "for seminal contributions to nearly every area of solid and fluid mechanics, including fracture mechanics, turbulence, stratified flows, flames, flow in porous media, and the theory and application of intermediate asymptotics."
