= International Society for Design and Development in Education =

The International Society for Design and Development in Education (ISDDE) was formed in 2005 with the goal of improving educational design in mathematics and science education around the world. Educational design has been an invisible topic relative to educational research, and there has been very little direct attention focused on design principles and design processes in educational design.

== Society goals ==
This international society, focused on mathematics and science education for strategic reasons, has the following main goals:

- broadly improve design and development processes used in educational design
- build and support a community among educational designers and create transformational training opportunities for new educational designers
- increase the impact of educational designers on educational practice throughout the world

== Governance ==
The society is run by an Executive of approximately 12 members. Three officers have particular duties (such as appointing local chairs of the annual conference, organizing the prize process, recruiting and reviewing new Fellows and members, and directing the journal).

- Current executive chair Lynne McClure, University of Cambridge
- Secretary Kristen Tripet, Australian Academy of Science

Chairs History

- Hugh Burkhardt 2005-2009
- Christian Schunn 2010-2014
- Susan McKenney 2015-2016
- Lynne McClure 2017-2018
- Jacquey Barber 2019-2020

Additional details on society governance are described in the society's constitution.

== ISDDE Journal ==
Starting in 2008, the society developed an open access Electronic journal, called the Educational Designer, with roughly annual issues. The editor-in-chief is Kaye Stacey from the University of Melbourne. As an online-only journal, it has the advantage of being able to provide detailed worked examples for other designers.

== Annual conference ==
- 2005 Oxford, England; Conference chair Hugh Burkhardt
- 2006 Oxford, England; Conference chair Hugh Burkhardt
- 2007 Berkeley, California, USA; Conference chair Elizabeth Stage
- 2008 Egmond aan Zee, the Netherlands; Conference Chair Peter Boon; ISDDE
- 2009 Cairns, Queensland, Australia; Conference Chair Kaye Stacey Conference – Cairns 2009 – ISDDE
- 2010 Oxford, England; Conference chair Malcolm Swan Conference – Oxford 2010 – ISDDE
- 2011 Boston, Massachusetts, USA; Conference Chairs Frank Davis & Christian Schunn;
- 2012 Utrecht, the Netherlands; Conference Chairs Peter Boon & Frans van Galen; Isdde Utrecht 2012
- 2013 Berkeley, California, USA; Conference Chairs Rena Dorph & Jacqueline Barber; ISDDE Berkeley 2013: International Society for Design and Development in Education
- 2014 Cambridge, England; Conference chair Lynne McClure; ISDDE 2014
- 2015 Boulder, Colorado, USA; Conference chair David Webb; ISDDE2015
- 2016 Utrecht, the Netherlands; Conference chairs Maarten Pieters, Wout Ottevanger, & Susan McKenney; ISDDE 2016
- 2017 Berkeley, California, USA; Conference chairs Suzy Loper and Mac Cannady; ISDDE 2017
- 2018 NUI Galway, Ireland; Conference chairs Tony Hall and Cornelia Connolly; ISDDE 2018
- 2019 Pittsburgh, Pennsylvania, USA; Conference chair Christian Schunn; ISDDE Pittsburgh
- 2020 Nottingham, England; Conference chair Geoff Wake

== Regional conference ==
- 2009 London, England;

== Prizes for Excellence in Design for Education, the "Eddies" ==
Starting in 2008, ISDDE supports a US$10,000 prize for excellence in educational design, known as the "Eddies". The prize alternates across years between rewarding particular designs and rewarding lifetime contributions to educational design.

2008 prize winners

- Malcolm Swan, Shell Centre, University of Nottingham for The Language of Functions and Graphs
- Glenda Lappan and Elizabeth Phillips, Michigan State University, for Connected Mathematics

2009 prize winner

- Paul Black of King's College London for a lifetime’s achievement of excellence in educational design and development in science and in technology.

2010 prize winner

- Michal Yerushalmy of the Research Institute of Alternatives in Education at the University of Haifa for Visual Math, a curriculum developed through a rigorous process to produce innovative materials with great demonstrated impact on students, teachers, and educational designers around the world.

2011 prize winner

- Jan de Lange of the University of Utrecht for a lifetime’s achievement of excellence in educational design and development in mathematics.

2012 prize winner

- Jacqueline Barber, Lawrence Hall of Science, University of California, Berkeley, for Seeds of Science/Roots of Reading.

2013 prize winner

- Hugh Burkhardt of the Shell Centre for Mathematical Education for a lifetime’s achievement in recognition of his outstanding contributions to the field, including his leadership of the Shell Centre and his key role in founding this Society.

2014 prize winner

- Christine Cunningham, Boston Museum of Science, for Engineering is Elementary.

2015 prize winner

- Solomon Garfunkel, Consortium for Mathematics and Its Applications, for COMAP

2016 prize winner

- Uri Wilensky, Northwestern University, for NetLogo

2017 prize winners

- Kaye Stacey, University of Melbourne
- Zalman Usiskin, University of Chicago

2018 prize winner

- Nicholas Jackiw, SRI International, Inc. / Simon Fraser University
