= Council for the Mathematical Sciences =

The Council for the Mathematical Sciences
- Abbreviation: CMS
- Formation: 2001
- Headquarters: De Morgan House
- Location: London, WC1
- Region served: UK
- Members: British mathematicians
- Secretary: Anne Bennett
- Chair: Alison Etheridge
- Affiliations: Edinburgh Mathematical Society, the IMA, the LMS, the OR Society and the RSS
- Website: CMS

The Council for the Mathematical Sciences (CMS) is an organisation that represents all types of British mathematicians at a national level. It is not a professional institution, but a collaboration of them.

== History ==
It was established in 2001 by the Institute of Mathematics and its Applications, the London Mathematical Society and the Royal Statistical Society to provide a forum for mathematics.

== Purpose ==
- to represent the interests of mathematics to government, Research Councils and other public bodies;
- to promote good practice in the mathematics curriculum and its teaching and learning at all levels and in all sectors of education;
- to respond coherently and effectively to proposals from government and other public bodies which may affect the mathematical community;
- to work with other bodies such as the Joint Mathematical Council and HoDoMS.

== Structure ==
It is situated off the A4200 in Russell Square, next to the University of London in the offices of the London Mathematical Society. It is accessed via the Russell Square tube station on the Piccadilly Line.
