= Helen Wilson (mathematician) =

British mathematician

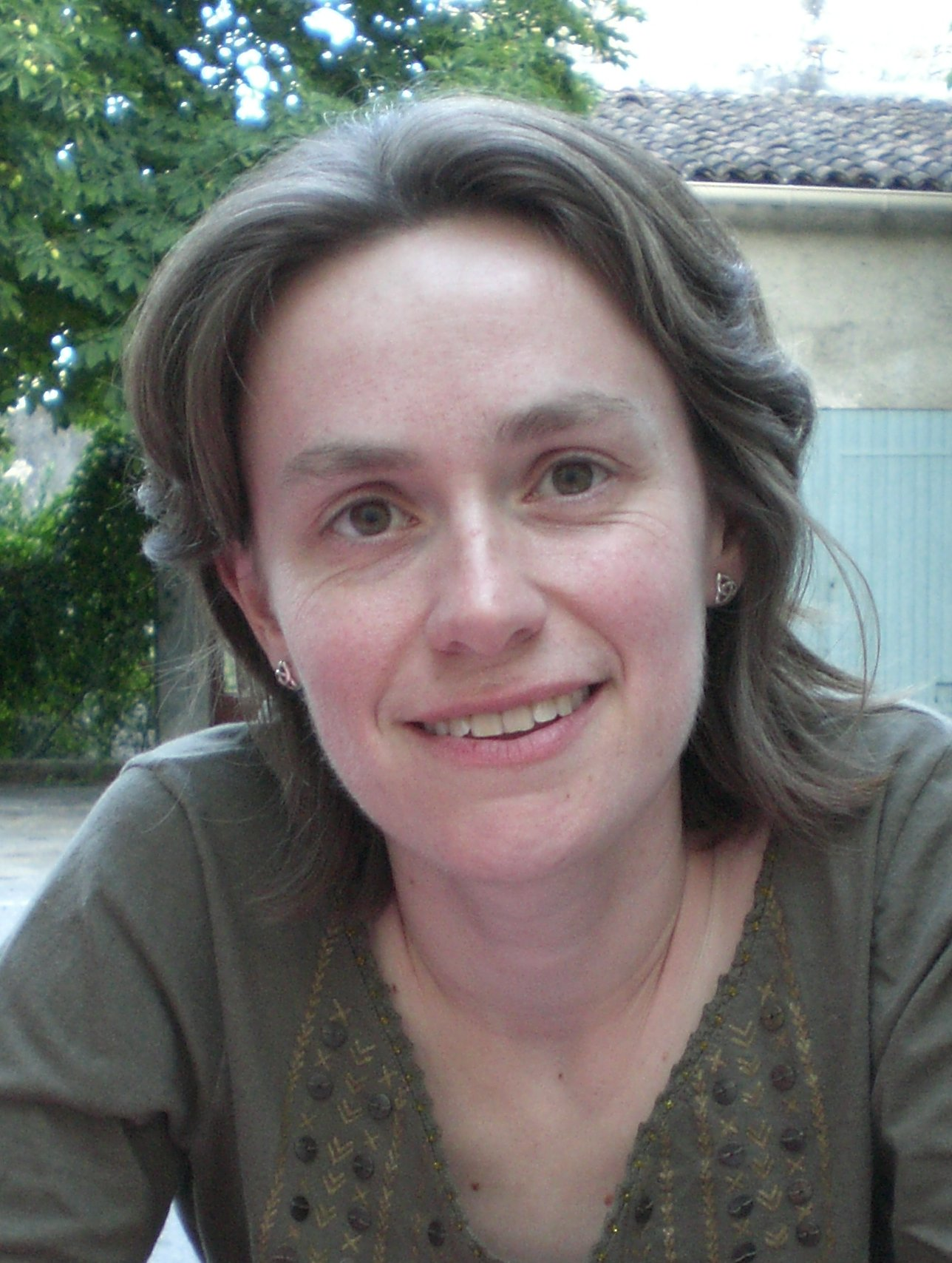
- Professor Helen Wilson
- Born: 1973 (age 52–53); Warrington, England
- Citizenship: United Kingdom
- Awards: President of www.bsr.org.ukBritish Society of Rheology, 2015-2017.

Academic background
- Education: Clare College, Cambridge (BA, MMath, PhD)
- Thesis: Shear Flow Instabilities in Viscoelastic Fluids (1998)
- Doctoral advisor: John Rallison
- Other advisor: Rob Davies

Academic work
- Discipline: Mathematics; Fluid Mechanics; Rheology
- Institutions: University of Colorado Boulder; University of Leeds; University College London
- Website: ucl.ac.uk/~ucahhwi/

Helen Jane Wilson, (born 1973), is a British mathematician and was the Head of Mathematics at University College London (UCL).

Her research focuses on the theoretical and numerical modelling of the flow of non-Newtonian fluids such as polymeric materials and particle suspensions.

== Early life and education ==
Wilson was born in Warrington. Her father, Leslie Knight Wilson was a chartered accountant; her mother, Brenda (née Naylor) a French teacher. She attended Broomfields Junior School and Bridgewater High School. Wilson studied at Clare College, Cambridge, completing a BA, Certificate of Advanced Study in Mathematics (later converted to an MMath) and PhD in mathematics. Her PhD thesis, titled "Shear Flow Instabilities in Viscoelastic Fluids", was supervised by John Rallison. On graduation she moved to the University of Colorado at Boulder, where she began research on suspension mechanics with Rob Davis in the Chemical Engineering department.

== Mathematical work ==
In 2000 Wilson returned to the UK to take up a lectureship in Applied Mathematics at the University of Leeds. In 2004 she moved to UCL, where she is Professor of Applied Mathematics and from 2018 to 2023 Head of department. Wilson is the first woman to hold the position of Head of Mathematics at UCL.

=== Research in fluid mechanics ===
Wilson's PhD thesis and early papers focused on instabilities in viscoelastic fluids. She predicted a new instability in channel flow of a shear-thinning fluid which was later discovered experimentally by another group and on which she still works. She has also worked on instabilities in shear-banding flows and in more complex geometries.

Her other major research interest, besides viscoelasticity, is suspension mechanics, and in particular the effect of particle contacts on fluid rheology. Her most recent projects draw these two fields together, investigating the interaction of solid particles with their complex material environment in fields ranging from healthcare to engineering.

Her academic publications are listed on the UCL site.

One of her best-known publications is the paper "The fluid dynamics of the chocolate fountain", co-authored with Adam Townsend. Unusually for a mathematical paper, this was covered in the Washington Post.

=== Knowledge transfer ===
Wilson gave the 2019 Joint London Mathematical Society Annual Lecture on "Toothpaste, custard and chocolate: mathematics gets messy".

Problem plastics & how mathematics can help, published in UCL Science and presented at Mathematics Works (Oct 2007).

Public lecture: From gases to gloops: Instabilities in fluids in the UCL Lunch Hour Lecture series on 23 February 2016.

=== Non-technical articles ===
Case study for the Royal Society on how a supportive employer can support a mother on her return to work.

Blog post and BBC World TV news interview commenting on the award of the Fields Medal to a female mathematician for the first time.

The D'Hondt method Explained: brief explanation of an easier way to understand the allocation of seats at the European elections

=== Books ===
Practical Analytical Methods for PDEs in volume 1 of the LTCC Advanced Mathematics series, World Scientific, 2015.

In 2016, Wilson co-authored with Dame Celia Hoyles a chapter of the book "Mathematics: How It Shaped Our World"

== Recognition ==
Wilson was president (for the 2015–2017 term) of the British Society of Rheology the first woman to hold this position.

In 2014 she was a member of the subject panel for Mathematics on ALCAB (the A Level Content Advisory Board), advising on the reforms to A Level Mathematics for first teaching in September 2016.

She was a Council Member and is now the vice-president (Learned Societies) of the Institute of Mathematics and its Applications.
