= Rich Kerswell =

British fluid mechanics scientist

Richard Rodney Kerswell FRS is a British fluid mechanics scientist and the G. I. Taylor Professor of Fluid Mechanics. He was elected Fellow of the Royal Society in 2012.

He received his Bachelor of Arts at Emmanuel College, Cambridge in 1987, his Master of Arts at the University of California in 1988, and his Doctor of Philosophy from the Massachusetts Institute of Technology in 1992. He was a mathematics professor in the University of Newcastle from 1992 to 1996 and in Bristol University from 1996 until he moved to the University of Cambridge in 2017.
