= G. I. Taylor Professor of Fluid Mechanics =

The G. I. Taylor Professorship of Fluid Mechanics is a professorship in fluid mechanics at the University of Cambridge. It was founded in 1992 and named in honor of G. I. Taylor, after a fundraising campaign by George Batchelor.

Philip Saffman, a student of Batchelor and Taylor, was offered the chair in the 1990s. However, he turned it down. He stated later that he was "very tempted" by the offer, but that he was stopped by the difficulty of moving his family from California to England.

== List of G. I. Taylor Professors of Fluid Mechanics ==
- 1992 – 1994 Grigory Barenblatt
- 1996 – 2009 Tim Pedley FRS
- 2010 – 2017, Paul Linden FRS
- 2017 – present, Rich Kerswell FRS
