= IMA Journal of Mathematical Control and Information =

- Discipline: Applied mathematics
- Language: English
- Edited by: Sarah Spurgeon OBE and Christophe Prieur

Publication details
- History: 1984-present
- Publisher: Oxford University Press
- Frequency: Quarterly
- Open access: Hybrid
- Impact factor: 1.034 (2019)

Standard abbreviations
- ISO 4: IMA J. Math. Control Inf.
- MathSciNet: IMA J. Math. Control Inform.

The IMA Journal of Mathematical Control and Information is published by Oxford University Press on behalf of the Institute of Mathematics and its Applications. The Journal publishes articles in control and information theory which aim to develop solutions for unsolved problems in the field.
