= Sarah L. Waters =

British applied mathematician

Sarah Louise Waters
- Education: University of Leeds
- Awards: Whitehead Prize (2012)
- Scientific career
- Workplaces: University of Oxford
- Thesis: Coronary artery haemodynamics: pulsatile flow in a tube of time-dependent curvature (1996)
- Doctoral advisor: Tim Pedley
- Website: people.maths.ox.ac.uk/waters/Waters/index.html

Sarah Louise Waters is a British applied mathematician whose research interests include biological fluid mechanics, tissue engineering, and their applications in medicine. She is a professor of applied mathematics in the Mathematical Institute at the University of Oxford, a Fellow of St Anne's College, Oxford, and a Leverhulme Trust Senior Research Fellow of the Royal Society.

Waters completed her Ph.D. at the University of Leeds in 1996. Her dissertation, Coronary artery haemodynamics: pulsatile flow in a tube of time-dependent curvature, was supervised by Tim Pedley. After her Ph.D. she was appointed to a lectureship at the University of Nottingham, where she worked on mathematical biology and medicine in collaboration with Helen Byrne and others. She was named a professor at Oxford in 2014.

In 2012, she won a Whitehead Prize "for her contributions to the fields of physiological fluid mechanics and the biomechanics of artificially engineered tissues".

In 2019, Waters was elected a fellow of the American Physical Society.
