= Peter Grindrod =

British mathematician and entrepreneur

Peter Grindrod CBE
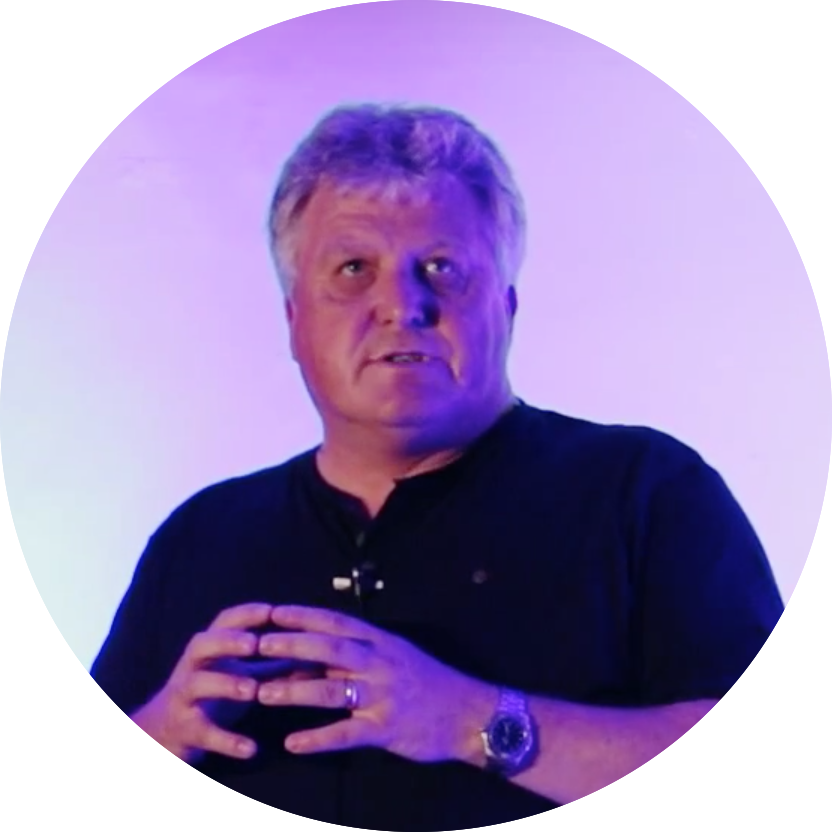
- Education: University of Bristol (laurea); University of Dundee (Ph.D)
- Awards: Honorary Doctorates from Strathclyde and Oxford Brookes
- Scientific career
- Workplaces: University of Oxford; University of Reading; Numbercraft Ltd; Intera Inc; University of Oxford; University of Dundee
- Doctoral advisor: Brian D Sleeman

Peter Grindrod, CBE is a British mathematician.

== Career ==
Grindrod was appointed a CBE in 2005 for services to mathematics R&D. He is a former member of the EPSRC Council (2000–04) and chair of the EPSRC's User Panel. He is a former president of the Institute of Mathematics and its Applications, the UK's professional and learned society for mathematicians (2006–08). He is also former member of BBSRC Council (2009–13). He is a former independent member of the MOD DSAC (2008–13). He was one of the founding directors (trustees) of the Alan Turing Institute, the UK's national centre for Data Science and AI.

He is active in considering novel ways to achieve higher impact from the UK's research and development programmes and he has written recently on the intrinsic lack of risk-taking within public R&D funding, due to wrong-framing of proposed projects (as individual bets, all judged absolutely and seeking success, rather than as a portfolio of investments of very distinct types and distinct levels of risks and possible returns); and the dead hand of consensual peer-review processes, which results in only rather safe-science (de-risked) being funded and avoids any investments where there is controversy or a lack of a reviewer consensus (which could indicate disruptive opportunities outside of the present paradigm). He has recently applied such thinking to the MOD's AI programme, the UK's national AI strategy and portfolio, and the forthcoming UK ARIA.

Grindrod began working in the theory and application of reaction diffusion equations. He obtained a degree in maths from the University of Bristol (1981) and a PhD from the University of Dundee (1983), after which followed a short period of post doctoral research in dynamical systems and nonlinear PDEs at Dundee. Between 1984 and 1989 he worked at the Mathematical Institute at the University of Oxford, largely on both applications and modelling within physiology and biology.

In 1989 he joined a commercial consulting company working in the environmental sciences, building up a mathematical modelling group on multidisciplinary projects in the UK, Europe, US and Japan. His research ranged from the application of fractals to simulating subsurface environments (micro medium structure controlling channelling flow and dispersion phenomena at the macroscopic scale), and non-linear multiphase (solutes, gases, and especially colloidal) dispersion processes, fully coupled chemical-temperature–hydration systems, through to the development of frameworks for estimating uncertainties within risk assessments, and the analysis of public risk perception.

He has developed models and methods for analyzing large networks (range dependent random graphs) occurring within the biosciences, such as in genome, proteome and metabolome interactions. He is interested in applications of mathematics to phenomena in the Digital Economy, and within neurodynamics. He is working on methods for analysing very large and evolving graphs/networks, including forecasting, inference and intervention problems. These have applications to large communication (telco, email social) networks – especially in monitoring marketing and intervention applications (including CT, cyber, and radicalisation modelling).

In 1998 he was co-founder and Technical Director of a start–up company, Numbercraft Limited, supplying services and software to retailers and consumer goods manufacturers. The need to extract structure and information, rapidly, and exhaustively, from large commercial data sets drove this. He worked with all of the major grocery retailers in the UK and their largest suppliers. Numbercraft, designed as a five-year project, was acquired by Lawson Software (St Paul, US) in 2003.

Around 2010, he was a co-founder of Cignifi Inc, based in Boston MA, developing behaviour based credit scoring methods for mobile Network Operators' (MNO's) customers, depending on their individual call data records over a just a few weeks. Cignifi operates within a number of counties, in partnerships with MNOs wishing to extend mobile bang to include loans, insurance es and other financial products.

Grindrod is also active in advising digital marketing companies, on their use of social network analytics.

He advises on technologies and methods that can use transactional (behavioural) data rather than traditional credit scoring methods (as many companies are thin file/no file).

He has explored agent-based simulation as a means of modelling and forecasting global marine trade and transport. Maritime groups are dependent on such data science.

In 2025, he founded an Oxford start-up, Astut Ltd, to develop creative hybrid AI generating viable decision options in response to never-before-experienced situations. Such problems have no relevant prior data, yet may have many constraints. Strategic decision-making and high stakes one-off decision-making fall into this class. Early applications are drawn from a number of sectors. Astut's technology is delivered to end users by various sector channel partners.

Grindrod is a professor of mathematics at the Mathematical Institute at the University of Oxford (2013– ). He is an expert in science and technology funding strategy and in increasing the appetite for risk and high impact public programmes. In 2020 he wrote a short book "Leading within Digital Worlds: Strategic Management for Data Science" for people who need to lead data science or AI research groups or ventures.
