= John McWhirter =

John McWhirter may refer to:

- John MacWhirter (1837–1911), Scottish landscape painter
- John MacWhirter (physician), president of the Royal College of Physicians of Edinburgh, 1831–1833
- John McWhirter (mathematician), British scientist
- John McWhirter, a fictional reporter in the film Full Disclosure

== See also ==
- John McWhorter (born 1965), American linguist
