= HoDoMS =

Organisation for UK mathematics educators

Heads of Departments of Mathematical Sciences
- Abbreviation: HoDoMS
- Purpose: Issues of relevance to the Heads of Departments of Mathematical Sciences
- Region served: UK
- Members: Heads of UK university mathematics departments
- Affiliations: Joint Mathematical Council (JMC)
- Website: HoDoMS

HoDoMS (Heads of Departments of Mathematical Sciences) is an educational company that acts as a body to represent the heads of United Kingdom higher education departments of mathematical sciences. It aims to discuss and promote the interests of higher education mathematics in the UK and to facilitate dialogue between departments.

== Governance ==
HoDoMS is operated by a committee including four officer roles which are listed below with incumbents. The committee includes observers from the Institute of Mathematics and its Applications, The OR Society, the Royal Statistical Society, the Council for the Mathematical Sciences and the Edinburgh Mathematical Society.

Officers of HoDoMS
Role	Incumbent
Chair	Mary McAlinden
Vice-chair	Stephen Langdon
Secretary	Anke Wiese
Treasurer	Jan van den Heuvel

== Activities ==
The main activity of HoDoMS is to run an annual conference bringing members together for briefings and discussion on current issues. For example, the 2020 conference heard briefings on policy issues such as research funding, the Research Excellence Framework 2021, the Teaching Excellence Framework as well as practicalities such as online marking, knowledge exchange, teaching as a career for mathematics undergraduates, and academics and mental health.

HoDoMS also collaborates with other organisations, for example with the London Mathematical Society on an 'Education Day' in 2019 and with the Institute of Mathematics and its Applications and the Isaac Newton Institute on an 'Induction Course for New Lecturers in the Mathematical Sciences' in 2021

== History ==
The first meeting of HoDoMS took place on 14 September 1995 at University College, London under its first chair, Graham Wilks. On 14 August 2018, HoDoMS was incorporated as a Private company limited by guarantee.

== Affiliations ==
HoDoMS is a member of the Joint Mathematical Council of the United Kingdom (JMC).

== See also ==
- Engineering Professors' Council
