= Conference of the Directors of French Engineering Schools =

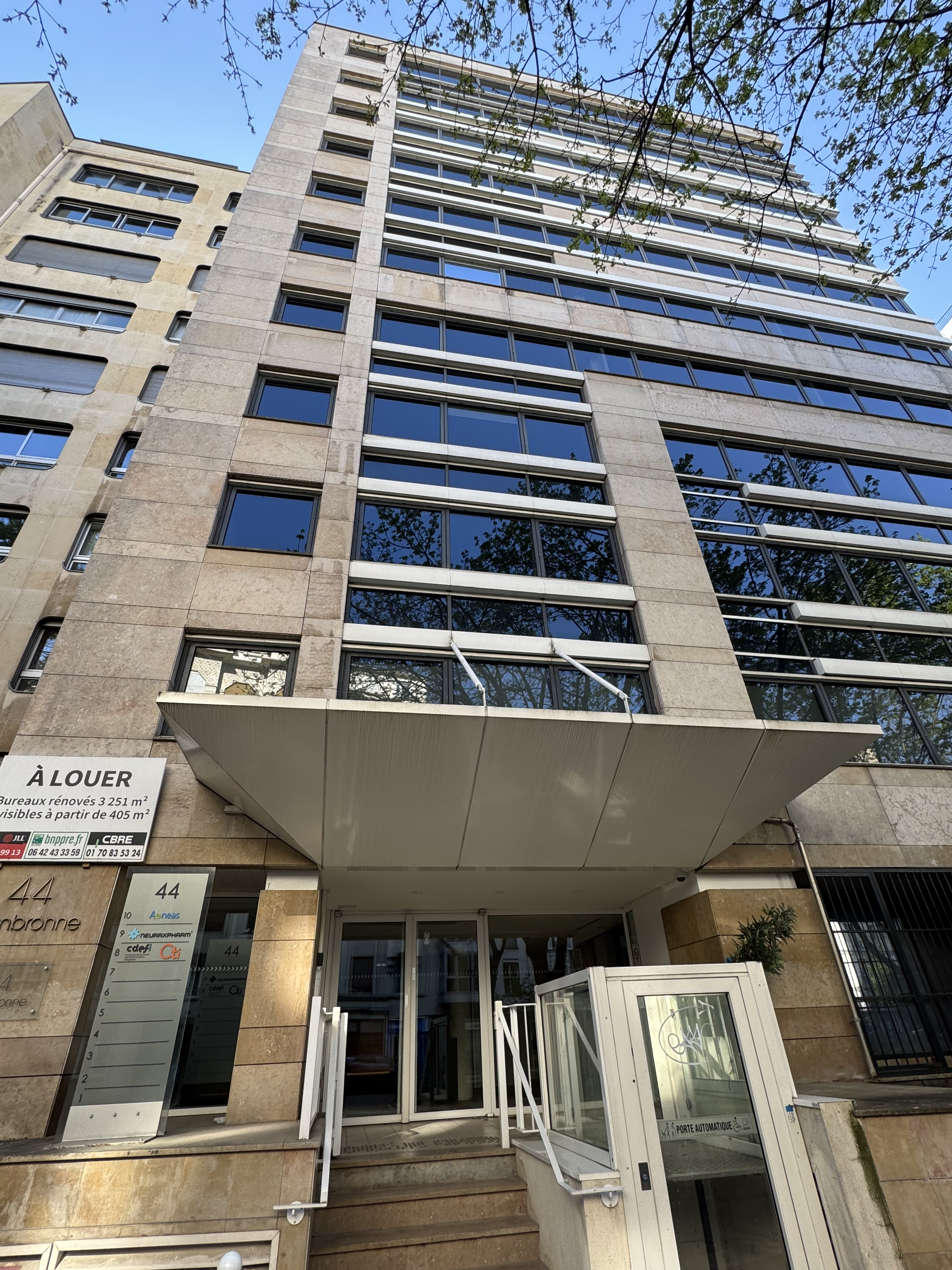
CDEFI headquarters in Paris

Conférence des directeurs des écoles françaises d'ingénieurs (French pronunciation: [kɔ̃feʁɑ̃s de diʁɛktœʁ dez‿ekɔl fʁɑ̃sɛːz dɛ̃ʒenjœʁ]; CDEFI) is French for "Conference of Deans of French Schools of Engineering".

The CDEFI is a French national institution that represents all engineering institutions that are accredited by the Commission des titres d'ingénieur (CTI) to deliver the French Diplôme d'Ingénieur.

The conference was originally an advisory body, established in 1976 and governed by Articles D.233-D.233-6 to 12 of the French Education Code, widely revised by Decree No. 2006-428 of 11 April 2006, which broadens the scope. It was then chaired by the law minister in charge of Higher Education.

Its president is Jacques Fayolle, Director of Télécom Saint-Étienne. The CDEFI board also consists of three Vice-presidents: Emmanuel Duflos, Director of École centrale de Lille; Jean-Michel Nicolle, Director of EPF; Sophie Mougard, Director of École des ponts ParisTech.

== See also ==
- Commission nationale de la certification professionnelle
- Conférence des grandes écoles (CGE)
- École nationale supérieure d'ingénieurs du Mans
- Education in France
- Engineering Professors' Council (UK)
