= Helen Byrne =

Professor of Applied Mathematics

- Education: University of Cambridge; University of Oxford
- Scientific career
- Workplaces: University of Bath; University of Manchester Institute of Science and Technology; University of Nottingham; University of Oxford
- Thesis: Modelling Combustion Zones in Porous Media (1991)
- Doctoral advisor: John Norbury

Helen M. Byrne is a mathematician based at the University of Oxford. She is Professor of Mathematical Biology in the university's Mathematical Institute and a Professorial Fellow in Mathematics at Keble College. Her work involves developing mathematical models to describe biomedical systems including tumours. She was awarded the 2019 Society for Mathematical Biology Leah Edelstein-Keshet Prize for exceptional scientific achievements and for mentoring other scientists and was appointed a Fellow of the Society in 2021.

== Early life and education ==
Byrne attended Manchester High School for Girls. Eventually she studied mathematics at Newnham College, Cambridge, where she became interested in the applications of mathematics to real-world problems. She moved to Wadham College, Oxford for her graduate studies, where she earned a master's degree in Mathematical Modelling and Numerical Analysis. She remained at Oxford for her doctoral degree in applied mathematics. She was appointed as a postdoctoral fellow at the cyclotron unit at Hammersmith Hospital. There, she started working in mathematical and theoretical biology. The biomedical questions she worked on included fitting mathematical models to positron emission tomography scans to evaluate oxygen and glucose transport and consumption within solid tumours. After hearing Mark Chaplain talk about tumours at a conference she realised she could use her mathematical skills to study tumour growth.

== Research and career ==
Byrne worked with Mark Chaplain at the University of Bath from 1993. She joined the University of Manchester Institute of Science and Technology as a lecturer in 1996. In 1998 Byrne joined the University of Nottingham, where she was promoted to Professor of Applied Mathematics in 2003. She was involved with the development of the Nottingham Centre for Mathematical Medicine and Biology, which she directed from 1999 to 2011.

She joined the faculty at the University of Oxford in 2011 where she was made Professor of Mathematical Biology based in the Mathematical Institute. Her research has considered mathematical models to describe biological tissue. She has explored how oxygen levels impact biological function, developing complex models that can describe disease progression. She was part of a team who demonstrated that cell cannibalism is involved in the development of inflammatory diseases.

Byrne was appointed Director of Equality and Diversity in the Mathematical, Physical and Life Sciences (MPLS) Division from 2016 to 2020. In 2018 she was awarded the Society for Mathematical Biology Leah Edelstein-Keshet Prize, being appointed a fellow of the society in 2021. Byrne is co-director of the University of Liverpool 3D BioNet (an interdisciplinary network looking at how cells grow in three dimensions) and was on the management group of the Engineering and Physical Sciences Research Council Cyclops Healthcare Network which ran from 2016 to 2019. She is a member of the IBS Biomedical Mathematics Group.

=== Selected publications ===
- Vipond, Oliver; Bull, Joshua A.; Macklin, Philip S.; Tillmann, Ulrike; Pugh, Christopher W.; Byrne, Helen M.; Harrington, Heather A. (2021-10-12). "Multiparameter persistent homology landscapes identify immune cell spatial patterns in tumors". Proceedings of the National Academy of Sciences. 118 (41) e2102166118. Bibcode:2021PNAS..11802166V. doi:10.1073/pnas.2102166118. ISSN 0027-8424. PMC 8522280. PMID 34625491.
- Nardini, John T.; Stolz, Bernadette J.; Flores, Kevin B.; Harrington, Heather A.; Byrne, Helen M. (2021-06-28). Chaplain, Mark (ed.). "Topological data analysis distinguishes parameter regimes in the Anderson-Chaplain model of angiogenesis". PLOS Computational Biology. 17 (6) e1009094. arXiv:2101.00523. Bibcode:2021PLSCB..17E9094N. doi:10.1371/journal.pcbi.1009094. ISSN 1553-7358. PMC 8270459. PMID 34181657.
- Maini, P. K.; Byrne, H. M.; Alarcón, T. (2003). "A cellular automaton model for tumour growth in inhomogeneous environment". Journal of Theoretical Biology. 225 (2): 257–274. Bibcode:2003JThBi.225..257A. doi:10.1016/S0022-5193(03)00244-3. PMID 14575659.
- Preziosi, Luigi; Byrne, H. M. (2003). "Modelling solid tumour growth using the theory of mixtures". Mathematical Medicine and Biology. 20 (4): 341–366. doi:10.1093/imammb/20.4.341. PMID 14969384.
- Byrne, Helen M. (2010). "Dissecting cancer through mathematics: from the cell to the animal model". Nature Reviews Cancer. 10 (3): 221–230. doi:10.1038/nrc2808. PMID 20179714. S2CID 24616792.

== Personal life ==
Whilst a graduate student at Oxford, she competed for OUWLRC in the Henley Boat Races in 1990 and 1991, earning a half blue each time.
