= École nationale supérieure d'ingénieurs du Mans =

Coordinates: 48°01′09″N 0°09′29″E

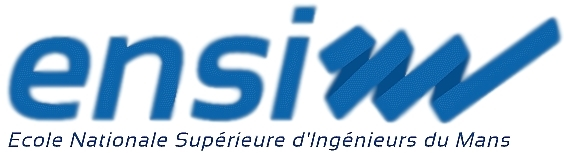
- Motto: Inventer le confort de demain
- Motto in English: "Invent the comfort of tomorrow"
- Established: 1994 (opened 1995)
- Affiliations: Groupe Archimède
- Director: Jean-François Tassin
- Students: 158
- Location: Le Mans, France
- Colors: ENSIM Blue, prior color, green
- Website: ensim.univ-lemans.fr

The École Nationale Supérieure d'Ingénieurs du Mans (French pronunciation: [ekɔl nɑsjɔnal sypeʁjœʁ dɛ̃ʒenjœʁ dy mɑ̃]) or ENSIM is a French Engineering school in Le Mans, and a member of the Conference of the Directors of French Engineering Schools (CDEFI).

The major fields of study at the ENSIM are vibration, acoustics, sensors and computing.

== Studies ==
=== Progression ===
The first three semesters provide students basic instruction in elements specific to engineering, enabling them to acquire core scientific skills, as well as starting to prepare them for their subsequent specialisation. Engineering students encounter the world of work during a four- to ten-week placement as a worker or technician.

The following two semesters provide students with the specific technical knowledge for their chosen specialisation. Students also perfect skills specific to engineering (management, quality, managing innovation, company culture, projects). During this part of their studies students may go on an industrial placement or study abroad.

The last stage of study is a final six-month industrial placement enabling engineering students to familiarise themselves with the demands of their profession.

=== Specialisations ===
- Vibrations, acoustics, sensors
  - Vibrations, acoustics (VA)
  - Microsystems and optical metrology (MCMO)
- Computer science
  - Real-time and embedded systems architecture (ASTRE)
  - Person-system interaction (IPS)

=== List of former directors at ENSIM ===
	Director	Service
1	Michel Rousseau	1995–2000
2	Jean Marc Breteau	2000–2004
3	Yves Guillotin	2004–2007
4	Pascal Leroux	2007-2017
5	Jean-François Tassin	2017-2022
6	Charles Pézerat	2022 - Now
