= Tim Pedley =

British mathematician (born 1942)

- Born: 23 March 1942 (age 84); Leicester
- Education: Trinity College, Cambridge
- Awards: Mayhew Prize (1963); Adams Prize (1977); IMA Gold Medal (2008)
- Scientific career
- Workplaces: Johns Hopkins University; Imperial College London; University of Cambridge; University of Leeds
- Thesis: Plumes, Bubbles and Vortices (1966)
- Doctoral advisor: George Batchelor
- Doctoral students: Sarah L. Waters

Timothy John Pedley FRS (born 23 March 1942) is a British mathematician and a former G. I. Taylor Professor of Fluid Mechanics at the University of Cambridge. His principal research interest is the application of fluid mechanics to biology and medicine.

== Early life and education ==
Pedley is the son of Richard Rodman Pedley and Jeanie Mary Mudie Pedley. He was educated at Rugby School and Trinity College, Cambridge.

== Academic career ==
Pedley spent three years at Johns Hopkins University as a post-doctoral fellow. From 1968 to 1973 he was a lecturer at Imperial College London, after which he moved to the Department of Applied Mathematics and Theoretical Physics (DAMTP) at the University of Cambridge.

Pedley remained at Cambridge until 1990 when he was appointed Professor of Applied Mathematics at the University of Leeds. In 1996 he returned to Cambridge and from 2000 to 2005 he was head of DAMTP.

== Research ==
Pedley has pioneered the application of fluid mechanics to understanding biological phenomena. His best-known work includes the study of blood flow in arteries, flow–structure interactions in elastic tubes, flow and pressure drop in the lung, and the collective behaviour of swimming microorganisms.

His research has touched on issues of medical importance, including arterial bypass grafts, urine flow from kidneys to bladder, and the ventilation of premature infants. His work on microorganisms has application to plankton ecology.

== Honours ==
Pedley is a fellow of Gonville and Caius College, Cambridge and was elected a Fellow of the Royal Society (FRS) in 1995. Pedley was elected a member of the National Academy of Engineering (1999) for research on biofluid dynamics, collapsible tube flow, and the theory of swimming of fish and microorganisms. In 2008 Pedley and Professor James Murray FRS were jointly awarded the Gold Medal of the Institute of Mathematics and its Applications in recognition of their "outstanding contributions to mathematics and its applications over a period of years".

He was the 2024 recipient of the Fluid Mechanics Prize of the European Mechanics Society, "for his seminal and outstanding contributions to fluid mechanics applied to biology and medicine, and for his distinguished service and leadership for the European and international fluid mechanics community".

== Marriage and children ==
In 1965 Pedley married Avril Jennifer Martin Uden, with whom he has two sons. He enjoys birdwatching, running and reading.
