= IMA Journal of Management Mathematics =

- Discipline: Management Science, Business Mathematics, Operational Research
- Language: English
- Edited by: Aris A Syntetos

Publication details
- History: 1986–present
- Publisher: Oxford University Press
- Frequency: Quarterly
- Open access: Hybrid
- Impact factor: 4.3 (2024)

Standard abbreviations
- ISO 4: IMA J. Manag. Math.

Indexing
- ISSN: 1471-678X (print); 1471-6798 (web)

Links
- Journal homepage

The IMA Journal of Management Mathematics (IMAMAN) is a quarterly peer reviewed academic journal published by Oxford University Press on behalf of the Institute of Mathematics and its Applications.

The journal publishes mathematical research of the highest quality that can be directly utilised or have demonstrable potential to be employed by managers to improve their practices.

It covers relevant research in all aspects of management mathematics, and is currently organised around 6 main Areas: Decision Analysis, Finance, Health and Society, Multidisciplinary Management Mathematics, Operations, and Sport.

== History ==
The history of the journal is discussed in detail in an Editorial contributed by Roge Mamon, Phil Scarf and Aris Syntetos in 2020.

The journal was established in 1986 and titled the IMA Journal of Mathematics in Management. This expanded the suite of mathematics journals published by Oxford University Press on behalf of the Institute of Mathematics and its Applications (IMA) from five to six journals. The first editorial by the first editors, Roy Stainton and Raymond Cuninghame-Green, made it very clear that ‘the central position of mathematics and the equal valuation of theory and practice shall be the hallmarks of [the] new journal’. This continues to be the guiding principle for the journal.

Roy Stainton was Professor of Operational Research at the University of Southampton and was appointed president of the Operational Research Society (ORS) in 1984. Many later editors also held the ORS presidency. Ray Cuninghame-Green was Professor of Industrial Mathematics at the University of Birmingham from 1975 to 1999, where he laid the foundations of management mathematics. He was a pioneer of max-algebra.

Lyn Thomas was appointed as editor in 1988, and the journal changed its name to the IMA Journal of Mathematics Applied in Business and Industry in the same year. Lyn was Professor at the University of Edinburgh (later at the University of Southampton) and served until 1996. Credit scoring was an important, developing topic during this time, and Lyn made many significant contributions. The Southampton connection was maintained when Sean McKee replaced Roy Stainton in 1992. Russell Cheng replaced Lyn in 1996 and served the journal until 2001.

During the 1970s, Lyn was a member of the OR group at the University of Manchester headed by Doug White. Indirectly then, Doug had an influence on the journal, not least because a later editor, Tony Christer, spent formative years in the same group. Tony was appointed as Editor in 2001 and changed the journal's title to IMA Journal of Management Mathematics, with which the journal persists to this day. Tony published many of his own papers in the journal on maintenance modelling. This remains an important topic for the journal. The first editors, Ray and Roy, would have approved of the title change, because management is universal whereas business and industry might be interpreted more narrowly. Nonetheless, the notion that mathematics should be at the heart of research published in the journal continues. This notion also distinguishes management mathematics from operational (operations) research and management science.

In 2003, Ken Darby-Dowman replaced Tony Christer. Under Ken's editorship, the finance thematic area of the journal began to develop. Robert Abrams, a former President of the OR Society of America, was appointed editor at the same time as Ken, and served until 2007. Rogemar Mamon, Professor at the University of Western Ontario, appointed in 2009, and oversaw all manuscripts relating to finance, insurance and actuarial science until 2021.

Tony Christer established the Centre for OR and Applied Statistics at the University of Salford in the mid-1980s. Colleagues of Tony there, Phil Scarf and Aris Syntetos, served as co-editors with Roge. Phil was editor from 2004 (until 2022), and Aris, now Professor of Decision Science at Cardiff Business School, since 2009 (currently serving as sole editor-in-chief). Continuing Tony's mantle, Phil published work on maintenance optimisation, but has also diversified into sports statistics. Aris works in inventory forecasting.

== Editors-in-chief ==
The journal is currently edited by Aris A. Syntetos, Cardiff University.

Previous Editors-in-Chief were:

Raymond Cuninghame-Green (1986-1988)

Roy Stainton (1986-1992)

Lyn Thomas (1988-1996)

Sean McKee (1992-2001)

Russell Cheng (1996-2001)

Tony Christer (2001-2003)

Robert Abrams (2002-2007)

Ken Darby-Dowman (2002-2009)

Rogemar Mamon (2009-2021)

Phil Scarf (2004-2022)

== Abstracting and Indexing ==
The IMA Journal of Management Mathematics is abstracted and indexed in American Mathematical Society, Mathematical Reviews, Magazines, Journal Citation Reports, ProQuest, Science Citation Index, and Zentralblatt Math. According to the latest Journal Citation Reports, the journal has a 2022 impact factor of 1.7.
