= Mathematics & Mechanics of Solids =

- Discipline: Mathematics
- Language: English
- Edited by: David J Steigmann

Publication details
- History: 1996-present
- Publisher: SAGE Publications
- Frequency: 8/year
- Impact factor: 2.953 (2016)

Standard abbreviations
- ISO 4: Math. Mech. Solids

Indexing
- CODEN: MMESFP
- ISSN: 1081-2865 (print); 1741-3028 (web)
- LCCN: 96658706
- OCLC no.: 40810423

Links
- Journal homepage; Online access; Online archive

Mathematics & Mechanics of Solids is a peer-reviewed academic journal that publishes papers in the fields of Mechanics and Mathematics. The journal's editor is David J Steigmann (University of California). It has been in publication since 1996 and is currently published by SAGE Publications.

== Scope ==
Mathematics and Mechanics of Solids is an international journal which publishes original research in solid mechanics and materials science. The journal’s aim is to publish original, self-contained research that focuses on the mechanical behaviour of solids with particular emphasis on mathematical principles.

== Abstracting and indexing ==
Mathematics & Mechanics of Solids is abstracted and indexed in, among other databases: SCOPUS, and the Social Sciences Citation Index. According to the Journal Citation Reports, its 2016 impact factor is 2.953, ranking it 72 out of 275 journals in the category ‘Materials Science, Multidisciplinary’. and 11 out of 100 journals in the category ‘Mathematics, Interdisciplinary Applications’. and 13 out of 133 journals in the category ‘Mechanics’.
