= Leone Burton =

British mathematician

Leone Minna Burton (née Gold; 14 September 1936 – 1 December 2007) was a professor of education in mathematics and science, working in London teacher education colleges in the 1970s, the Open University in the 1980s and, from 1992, the University of Birmingham. At the South Bank Polytechnic (now London South Bank University), she helped establish the first MSc in Mathematics Education in the UK. After retiring in 2001 she became Honorary Professor at King's College London, and Visiting Fellow in the Cambridge University Faculty of Education. She was noted for her influence as a researcher and doctoral supervisor, setting up national and international research networks in the developing area of mathematics education.

== Education ==
Burton was born in Australia and moved to England in her early twenties. She attended the University of London studying mathematics. She began teaching at the secondary level but disliked the educational structure and methods of the day and moved to teaching at the primary level to have a greater opportunity to change teaching structure. She received a postgraduate certificate in education in 1966 and an academic diploma in education in 1968, both from the University of London. In 1967 she obtained a post as a mathematical education specialist at Battersea College of Education, which was dedicated to teacher preparation. She received her PhD from the Institute of Education in 1980 with a thesis entitled "The impact of education on political development".

== Career and notable works ==
Leone Burton's contribution to mathematics education focused on researching the practices of working mathematicians and arguing their relevance for school teaching and learning. This research is included in what is now termed the field of ethnomathematics which examines how mathematics is related to the culture in which it is developed. At the Open University, Burton collaborated in creating innovative courses in teacher education, Developing Mathematical Thinking, that emphasized the role of problem solving in mathematics and argued that teachers should be aware of mathematical reasoning as well as mathematical content. A subsequent publication, Thinking Mathematically, written in 1982 with Mason and Stacey, brought these ideas to an international teacher audience focusing on teachers' own knowledge of using and applying mathematics.

From 1984 to 1988 Burton was international convenor for the International Organization of Women and Mathematics Education and visiting professor at institutions in Asia. She played a major role in shifting teachers’ perceptions in relation to girls and mathematics in the UK and other places around the world. Burton founded the monograph series International Perspective on Mathematics Education with the Greenwood Publishing group in 2001 which published three monographs between 2002 and 2006. This monograph series was subsequently renamed International Perspectives on Mathematics Education: Cognition, Equity and Society in honor of her pioneering work on equity and gender issues in mathematics education, edited by Bharath Sriraman, and published by Information Age Publishing.

Her final book, Mathematicians as Enquirers, used interviews to characterize the ways professional mathematicians learn, including enquiry, visualization and collaboration. This research showed that the ways mathematicians learn are consistent with principles recognized in mathematics education research as suitable for school learning.

== Family ==
She married John W. Burton in 1966 and they had a son in 1968.
