= IMA Journal of Applied Mathematics =

- Discipline: Applied mathematics
- Language: English
- Edited by: Alan Champneys, Demetrios T. Papageorgiou

Publication details
- Former names: Journal of the Institute of Mathematics and Its Applications
- History: 1965–present
- Publisher: Oxford University Press
- Frequency: Bimonthly
- Open access: Hybrid
- Impact factor: 1.490 (2019)

Standard abbreviations
- ISO 4: IMA J. Appl. Math.

Indexing
- ISSN: 0272-4960 (print); 1464-3634 (web)

Links
- Journal homepage

The IMA Journal of Applied Mathematics is a publication of Oxford University Press on behalf of the Institute of Mathematics and its Applications. Created in 1965, the Journal covers topics related to the application of mathematics.
