= Mathematical Medicine and Biology =

- Discipline: Applied mathematics
- Language: English
- Edited by: Oliver E. Jensen, John R. King, and James P. Keener

Publication details
- Former names: IMA Journal of Mathematics Applied in Medicine and Biology
- History: 1984-present
- Publisher: Oxford University Press
- Frequency: Quarterly
- Open access: Hybrid
- Impact factor: 1.854 (2020)

Standard abbreviations
- ISO 4: Math. Med. Biol.

Indexing
- ISSN: 1477-8599

Mathematical Medicine and Biology is an academic journal published by Oxford University Press on behalf of the Institute of Mathematics and its Applications. The Journal publishes articles addressing topics in medicine and biology with mathematical content.

== Impact factor ==
Mathematical Medicine and Biology received an impact factor of 1.854 in 2020.

== Editors ==
The editors-in-chief are Oliver E. Jensen (University of Manchester), John R. King (University of Nottingham), and James P. Keener (University of Utah).
