= Philip Bond (mathematician) =

Philip Bond is a British researcher recognized for leading an independent review on knowledge exchange in the mathematical sciences for UKRI – UK Research and Innovation. His 2018 report, 'The era of mathematics' highlights the critical, increasing role of mathematical modelling and data analysis across various UK industrial sectors and led to the founding of a new national academy for mathematical sciences.

Bond is a professor of creativity and innovation at the University of Manchester, a visiting professor in the Departments of Engineering Mathematics and Computer Science at the University of Bristol, and a visiting fellow in the Oxford Industrial and Applied Mathematics Centre.

In 2020, Bond was elected a fellow of the Royal Academy of Engineering. In 2012 he led a UK government foresight report on financial trading and in 2014 Bond was appointed to the UK Council for Science and Technology which advises the prime minister.
