= Advisory Committee on Mathematics Education =

British policy council

The Advisory Committee on Mathematics Education (ACME) is a British policy council for the Royal Society based in London, England. Founded in 2002 by the Royal Society and the Joint Mathematical Council, ACME analyzes mathematics education practices and provides advice on education policy. ACME is funded by the Gatsby Charitable Foundation (2002–2015) and the Department for Education.

== Members ==
The committee chair is appointed for a three-year term. As of 2018, the membership is composed of:

- Frank Kelly (Chair)
- Martin Bridson
- Paul Glaister
- Paul Golby
- Jeremy Hodgen
- Mary McAlinden
- Lynne McClure
- Emma McCoy
- Jil Matheson
- David Spiegelhalter
- Sally Bridgeland
