= Engineering Professors' Council =

University association in UK

The Engineering Professors' Council is a British university association that represents university staff in UK engineering facilities, for discussing and coordinating course content and direction.

== History ==
=== Earlier organisations ===
The Engineering Professors' Conference was set up in the early 1950s to allow an annual conference, held in London, where Engineering academic staff could meet.

It was set up by Edmund Giffen (1 January 1902 - 2 July 1963), a Northern Irish professor of mechanical engineering from Gilford, County Down, and director of research from 1940 to 1945 for the Institution of Automobile Engineers, notably on diesel engines, which soon after became the Automotive branch of the IMechE.

The EPC became a recognised organisation around 1974.

The Committee for Engineering in Polytechnics was formed in 1979, under chairman Thomas Deas Eastop (April 1931 - September 2018), head of the department of Mechanical Engineering at Wolverhampton Polytechnic, who authored the standard reference textbook Applied Thermodynamics for Engineering Technologists ISBN 0582444292, with Allan McConkey, head of the department of Mechanical Engineering at Dundee Institute of Technology.

In the early 1980s, the EPC requested that the Engineering section was removed from the Science and Engineering Research Council, with a separate Engineering research council. This would happen by 1994, with the formation of the EPSRC.

=== Formation ===
The organisation was formed in January 1994 by the merger of the Engineering Professors' Conference and the Committee for Engineering in Polytechnics.

== Function ==
It has worked with the Office for Students (OfS) and with the UK government (the Science and Technology Select Committee) on funding for engineering research at UK universities.

=== EPC Annual Congress ===
The society holds an annual two-day conference at different universities.

- 25–27 March 2002, Durham University
- 14–16 April 2003, University of Surrey
- 4–6 April 2004, Cardiff University
- 3–5 April 2006, Staffordshire University
- 26–28 March 2007, University of Leeds
- 1–2 April 2008, University of Warwick
- 21–22 April 2009, Heriot-Watt University
- 13–14 April 2010, Loughborough University
- 12 April 2011, London South Bank University
- 17–18 April 2012, University of Leicester
- 16–17 April 2013, University of Portsmouth
- 8–9 April 2014, University of Glasgow
- 14–15 April 2015, University of Salford
- 4–6 September 2016, University of Hull
- 11–13 September 2017, Coventry University
- 14–16 May 2018, Harper Adams University, Shropshire
- 13–15 May 2019, UCL
- 7–9 June 2022, UWE
- 12–14 June 2023, New Model Institute for Technology and Engineering in Hereford; the local MP Jesse Norman gave the main address
- 9–11 June 2024 Cardiff University, annual congress dinner at the National Museum Cardiff, speakers were Prof John Chudley, chairman of the Engineering Council, Mary Curnock Cook, former chief of UCAS, and Mark Drakeford

== Structure ==
It is headquartered in Surrey.

=== Chairmen ===
- 1977, Alec J W Chisholm (1922–2014), Professor of Mechanical Engineering at the University of Salford, and a former chairman of Collège International pour la Recherche en Productique (CIRP), with deputy Sir Bernard Crossland, Professor of Mechanical Engineering at Queen's University Belfast, and President of the IMechE in 1986.
- 1981, Robert C Smith, of the Faculty of Engineering and Applied Science at the University of Southampton
- Bob Boucher (educator) CBE, Vice-Chancellor from 1995 to 2001 of the University of Manchester Institute of Science and Technology (UMIST)

== See also ==
- European Society for Engineering Education
- Council for Science and Technology, UK government advisory committee
- HoDoMS
- Royal Academy of Engineering
- Conference of the Directors of French Engineering Schools
