= How to Think Like a Mathematician =

2009 book by Kevin Houston

- Author: Kevin Houston
- Language: English
- Genre: Mathematics
- Publisher: Cambridge University Press
- Publication date: 12 February 2009
- Publication place: United Kingdom
- Media type: Print (Hardcover)
- Pages: 274
- ISBN: 978-052-171978-0

How to Think Like a Mathematician: A Companion to Undergraduate Mathematics is a book by Kevin Houston, a senior lecturer in mathematics at the University of Leeds. It was published in 2009 by Cambridge University Press.

The book targets current and incoming undergraduate students of mathematics, and focuses on the mathematical language and techniques required for proof writing.

== Summary ==
The book is divided into five chapters:

1. Study skills for mathematicians
2. How to think logically
3. Definitions, theorems and proofs
4. Techniques of proof
5. Mathematics that all mathematicians need

== Reception ==
Michele Intermont of the Mathematical Association of America described the book as a "wonderful resource". Franz Lemmermeyer remarked that "the book is clearly written and contains suggestions and exercises from which not only undergraduates, but also highschool students can benefit".
