= Connected Mathematics =

Junior high school curriculum

Connected Mathematics is a comprehensive mathematics program intended for U.S. students in grades 6–8. The curriculum design, text materials for students, and supporting resources for teachers were created and have been progressively refined by the Connected Mathematics Project (CMP) at Michigan State University with advice and contributions from many mathematics teachers, curriculum developers, mathematicians, and mathematics education researchers.

The current third edition of Connected Mathematics is a major revision of the program to reflect new expectations of the Common Core State Standards for Mathematics and what the authors have learned from over twenty years of field experience by thousands of teachers working with millions of middle grades students. This CMP3 program is now published in paper and electronic form by Pearson Education.

== Core principles ==
The first edition of Connected Mathematics, developed with financial support from the National Science Foundation, was designed to provide instructional materials for middle grades mathematics. It was based on the 1989 Curriculum and Evaluation Standards and the 1991 Professional Standards for Teaching Mathematics from the National Council of Teachers of Mathematics. These standards highlighted four core features of the curriculum:

1. Comprehensive coverage of mathematical concepts and skills across four content strands—number, algebra, geometry and measurement, and probability and statistics.
2. Connections between the concepts and methods of the four major content strands, and between the abstractions of mathematics and their applications in real-world problem contexts.
3. Instructional materials that transform classrooms into dynamic environments where students learn by solving problems and sharing their thinking with others, while teachers encourage and support students to be curious, to ask questions, and to enjoy learning and using mathematics.
4. Developing students' understanding of mathematical concepts, principles, procedures, and habits of mind, and fostering the disposition to use mathematical reasoning in making sense of new situations and solving problems.

These principles have guided the development and refinement of the Connected Mathematics program for over twenty years. The first edition was published in 1995; a major revision, also supported by National Science Foundation funding, was published in 2006; and the current third edition was published in 2014. In the third edition, the collection of units was expanded to cover Common Core Standards for both grade eight and Algebra I.

Each CMP grade level course aims to advance student understanding, skills, and problem-solving in every content strand, with increasing sophistication and challenge over the middle school grades. The problem tasks for students are designed to make connections within mathematics, between mathematics and other subject areas, and/or to real-world settings that appeal to students.

Curriculum units consist of 3–5 investigations, each focused on a key mathematical idea; each investigation consists of several major problems that the teacher and students explore in class. Applications/Connections/Extensions problem sets are included for each investigation to help students practice, apply, connect, and extend essential understandings.

While engaged in collaborative problem-solving and classroom discourse about mathematics, students are explicitly encouraged to reflect on their use of what the NCTM standards once called mathematical processes and now refer to as mathematical practices—making sense of problems and solving them, reasoning abstractly and quantitatively, constructing arguments and critiquing the reasoning of others, modeling with mathematics, using mathematical tools strategically, seeking and using structure, expressing regularity in repeated reasoning, and communicating ideas and results with precision.

== Implementation challenges ==
The introduction of new curriculum content, instructional materials, and teaching methods is challenging in K–12 education. When the proposed changes contrast with long-standing traditional practice, it is common to hear concerns from parents, teachers, and other professionals, as well as from students who have been successful and comfortable in traditional classrooms. In recognition of this innovation challenge, the National Science Foundation complemented its investment in new curriculum materials with substantial investments in professional development for teachers. By funding state and urban systemic initiatives, local systemic change projects, and math-science partnership programs, as well as national centers for standards-based school mathematics curriculum dissemination and implementation, the NSF provided powerful support for the adoption and implementation of the various reform mathematics curricula developed during the standards era.

In addition to those programs, for nearly twenty years, CMP has sponsored summer Getting to Know CMP institutes, workshops for leaders of CMP implementation, and an annual User's Conference for the sharing of implementation experiences and insights, all on the campus of Michigan State University. The whole reform curriculum effort has greatly enhanced the field's understanding of what works in that important and challenging process—the clearest message being that significant lasting change takes time, persistent effort, and coordination of work by teachers at all levels in a system.

== Research findings ==
Connected Mathematics has become the most widely used of the middle school curriculum materials developed to implement the NCTM Standards. The effects of its use have been described in expository journal articles and evaluated in mathematics education research projects. Many of the research studies are master's or doctoral dissertation research projects focused on specific aspects of the CMP classroom experience and student learning. But there have also been a number of large-scale independent evaluations of the results of the program.

In the large-scale controlled research studies the most common (but by no means universal) pattern of results has been better performance by CMP students on measures of conceptual understanding and problem solving and no significant difference between students of CMP and traditional curriculum materials on measures of routine skills and factual knowledge. For example, this pattern is what the LieCal project found from a longitudinal study comparing learning by students in CMP and traditional middle grades curricula:

(1) Students did not sacrifice basic mathematical skills if they were taught using a standards-based or reform mathematics curriculum like CMP; (2) African American students experienced greater gains in symbol manipulation when they used a traditional curriculum; (3) the use of either the CMP or a non-CMP curriculum improved the mathematics achievement of all students, including students of color; (4) the use of CMP contributed to significantly higher problem-solving growth for all ethnic groups; and (5) a high level of conceptual emphasis in a classroom improved the students’ ability to represent problem situations.

Perhaps the most telling result of all is reported in the 2008 study by James Tarr and colleagues at the University of Missouri. While finding no overall significant effects from use of reform or traditional curriculum materials, the study did discover effects favoring the NSF-funded curricula when those programs were implemented with high or even moderate levels of fidelity to Standards-based learning environments. That is, when the innovative programs are used as designed, they produce positive effects.

== Historical controversy ==
Like other curricula designed and developed during the 1990s to implement the NCTM Standards, Connected Math was criticized by supporters of more traditional curricula. Critics made the following claims:

- Reform curricula like CMP pay too little attention to the development of basic computational skills in number and algebra;
- Student investigation and discovery of key mathematical concepts and skills might lead to critical gaps and misconceptions in their knowledge.
- Emphasis on mathematics in real-world contexts might cause students to miss abstractions and generalizations that are the powerful heart of the subject.
- The lack of explanatory prose in textbooks makes it hard for parents to help their children with homework and puts students with weak note-taking abilities, poor handwriting, slow handwriting, and attention deficits at a distinct disadvantage. Additionally, with limited explanatory written materials, students who miss one or more days of school will struggle to catch up on missed materials.
- Small-group learning is less efficient than teacher-led direct instructional methods, and the most able and interested students might be held back by having to collaborate with less able and motivated students.
- The CMP program does not take into account the needs of students with minor learning disabilities or other disabilities who might be integrated into general education classrooms but still need extra help and need associated or modified learning materials.

The publishers and creators of CMP have stated that reassuring results from a variety of research projects blunted concerns about basic skill mastery, missing knowledge, and student misconceptions resulting from use of CMP and other reform curricula.
