= Smestow Academy =

Coordinates: 52.5809°N 2.1852°W

Location
- Windmill Crescent; Castlecroft; Wolverhampton, West Midlands, WV3 8HU; England

Information
- Type: Academy
- Established: 1964
- Trust: Matrix Academy Trust
- Department for Education URN: 149635 Tables
- Headteacher: Ian Chamberlain
- Gender: Coeducational
- Age: 11 to 18
- Website: https://smestowacademy.co.uk/

Smestow Academy (formerly Smestow School), also known as simply Smestow (pronounced "smest-oh") is a coeducational secondary school and sixth form located in the Castlecroft area of Wolverhampton, England.

== History ==
The school was founded in 1964 under the authority of Staffordshire County Council. Originally it was known as Tettenhall Number 2 with the number 1 school becoming Regis (now St Regis Church of England Academy). It is named after the River Smestow, to which it is very close, although the school grounds are actually bordered by the Finchfield Brook and the Staffordshire and Worcestershire Canal. It was incorporated within Wolverhampton by the boundary changes accompanying local government reform in 1974, which brought Castlecroft and Tettenhall into Wolverhampton.

The school became a specialist Sports college, and was presented with ARTSMARK (alongside the previously awarded SPORTSMARK) in 2004 for outstanding success in Drama & the Arts. Smestow has a wide variety of sporting facilities including a gymnasium, swimming pool, PE hall, four separate changing rooms, a fitness suite/gym, a small dance/aerobics area (also used for drama room) a set of tennis courts and two large playing fields as well as the new sports hall.

In February 2014 the school converted to academy status, and became part of the University of Wolverhampton Multi-Academy Trust. In January 2023 Smestow School was rebrokered, and was renamed Smestow Academy.

In January 2015 a new Sixth Form Study Centre and library opened to promote and support students studying at Smestow.

== Notable former pupils ==
- Suzi Perry, English television presenter, columnist and model
- Sam Winnall a professional footballer currently at Scunthorpe United FC
- Andy Tennant, European Track Champion Cyclist for Great Britain (2006)
- Satnam Rana, BBC Midlands Today television presenter
- Rob Manuel, Web Media Producer
- Lisa Potts GM, former nursery teacher who defended her class from a violent attack
- Sam Andrew Gumbley, better known by his stage name S-X, is a British record producer, singer and songwriter
