= Joint Mathematical Council =

Organization in the UK

The Joint Mathematical Council (JMC) of the United Kingdom was formed in 1963 to "provide co-ordination between the Constituent Societies and generally to promote the advancement of mathematics and the improvement of the teaching of mathematics".

The JMC serves as a forum for discussion between societies and for making representations to government and other bodies and responses to their enquiries. It is concerned with all aspects of mathematics at all levels from primary to higher education.

== Members ==
The participating bodies are

- Adults Learning Mathematics
- Association of Teachers of Mathematics
- Association of Mathematics Education Teachers
- British Society for the History of Mathematics
- British Society for Research into Learning Mathematics
- HoDoMS
- Edinburgh Mathematical Society
- Institute of Mathematics and its Applications
- London Mathematical Society
- Mathematical Association
- Mathematics in Education and Industry
- National Association for Numeracy and Mathematics in Colleges
- National Association of Mathematics Advisers
- National Numeracy
- STEM Learning
- NRICH
- Operational Research Society
- Royal Academy of Engineering
- Royal Statistical Society
- Scottish Mathematical Council
- United Kingdom Mathematics Trust

The observing bodies are

- Advisory Committee on Mathematics Education
- Department for Education (England)
- Department of Education (Northern Ireland)
- Education Scotland
- National Centre for Excellence in Teaching Mathematics
- Office for Standards in Education
- The Office of Qualifications and Examinations Regulation
- The Royal Society
- Scottish Qualifications Authority
- Welsh Government Education Directorate

== Leadership ==
The Chair of the JMC is Andy Noyes, Professor of Education at the University of Nottingham and is a member of the Royal Society Advisory Committee on Mathematics Education.
