= Syncron (company) =

Supply chain management software company

- Type: Privately held company
- Industry: Supply Chain Management, SaaS, Aftermarket
- Founded: 1990
- Founders: Tony Abouzolof and Håkan Amnäs
- Headquarters: Stockholm, Sweden
- Area served: Global
- Key people: Josh Weiss (CEO, Apr 2025 - present); Risa Sparks (CFO, Aug 2025 - present); Claire Rychlewski (CRO, Nov 2024–present)
- Subsidiaries: Eazystock https//eazystock.com
- Website: https://www.syncron.com/

Syncron is a Swedish software company offering cloud-based aftermarket supply chain and service operations solutions to original equipment manufacturers (OEMs) in sectors including automotive, industrial machinery, construction and mining, and agriculture. Founded in 1990, Syncron provides solutions for service parts inventory management, parts and contract pricing optimization, warranty management, centralized repair operations, and field service technician enablement.

== History ==
Syncron was founded in Stockholm, Sweden, in 1990. In 2018, private equity firm Summit Partners acquired a $67 million minority stake in the company to support global expansion. In 2021, Syncron merged with Tampa, Florida-based Mize, a provider of warranty and field service management software pushing revenue to beyond $60 M

=== Recent developments ===
- Nov 2024 – Claire Rychlewski appointed Chief Revenue Officer.
- Apr 2025 – Josh Weiss appointed CEO, succeeding Fritz Neumeyer.
- Aug 2025 – Risa Sparks appointed Chief Financial Officer, succeeding Daniel Rosenthal.

== Industries ==
Syncron’s software is used by OEMs in industries where aftermarket parts and service management are critical to business operations. Its publicly referenced core markets include:

- Automotive
- Industrial machinery
- Construction and mining equipment
- Agriculture and related heavy equipment

== Products ==
Syncron develops cloud-based software for aftermarket service operations. The company’s publicly listed solutions are grouped into three main categories:

- Pricing – Includes Price, an AI-driven platform for service parts pricing optimization, and Contract Price, which supports outcome-based service contract pricing.
- Inventory – Includes Parts Planning, a service parts planning solution for manufacturers, and Dealer Parts Planning, which enables OEMs to forecast demand and manage parts inventory across their dealer networks.
- Service Fulfillment – Includes Warranty Management for warranty and claims processing, Depot Repair for centralized repair operations, and Technician Enablement tools to support field service technicians.

== Operations and market presence ==
Syncron is headquartered in Stockholm, Sweden, and has additional offices in Malmö, Sweden; Chicago, IL and Tampa, FL in the United States; Birmingham, United Kingdom; Munich, Germany; Paris, France; Warsaw, Poland; Bangalore and Hyderabad, India; and Tokyo, Japan. Syncron is privately held, with private equity firm Summit Partners holding a minority stake acquired in 2018.

== Awards and recognition ==
- Named a Leader in the IDC MarketScape: Worldwide Manufacturing Service Parts Planning Applications 2023–2024 Vendor Assessment.
- Positioned as a Leader in the IDC MarketScape: Worldwide Supply Chain Planning for Spare Parts and MRO Industries 2024 Vendor Assessment.
