= Institute of Mathematics and its Applications =

UK professional body

The Institute of Mathematics and its Applications (IMA)
- Formation: 1964
- Type: Learned society
- Headquarters: Southend-on-Sea, Essex
- Location: UK
- Key people: Dr Heather Tewkesbury (President); Rosalind Azouzi (Executive Director)
- Website: ima.org.uk

The Institute of Mathematics and its Applications (IMA) is the UK's chartered professional body for mathematicians and one of the UK's learned societies for mathematics (another being the London Mathematical Society).

The IMA aims to advance mathematics and its applications, promote and foster research and other enquiries directed the advancement, teaching and application of mathematics, to seek to establish and maintain high standards of professional conduct for members and to seek to promote, encourage and guide the development of education and training in mathematics.

== History ==
In 1959, the need for a professional and learned body for mathematics and its applications was recognised independently by both Sir James Lighthill and a committee of the heads of the mathematics departments of several colleges of technology together with some interested mathematicians from universities, industry and government research establishments. After much discussion, the name and constitution of the institute were confirmed in 1963, and the IMA was approved as a company limited by guarantee on 23 April 1964. In 1990, the institute was incorporated as a royal charter company, and it was registered as a charity in 1993.

== Governance ==
The institute is governed via a Council, made up of between 25 and 31 individuals including a president, three past presidents, elected and co-opted members, and honorary officers.

=== IMA president ===
The president normally serves a two-year term. This is a list of the presidents of the IMA:

- 1964–1966: Sir James Lighthill FRS
- 1966–1967: Professor Sir Bryan Thwaites
- 1968–1969: Dr Peter Wakely FRS
- 1970–1971: Professor George Barnard
- 1972–1973: Professor Charles Coulson FRS
- 1974–1975: Sir Hermann Bondi FRS
- 1976–1977: HRH The Duke of Edinburgh
- 1978–1979: Dame Kathleen Ollerenshaw
- 1980–1981: Sir Samuel Edwards FRS
- 1982–1983: Dr Peter Trier
- 1984–1985: Sir Harry Pitt FRS
- 1986–1987: Professor Bob Churchhouse FRS
- 1988–1989: Professor Douglas Jones FRS
- 1990–1991: Sir Roy Harding
- 1992-1993: J H McDonnell
- 1993–1995: Professor Lord Julian Hunt FRS
- 1996–1997: Professor David Crighton FRS
- 1998–1999: Professor Henry Beker
- 2000–2001: Professor Stephen Reid
- 2002–2003: Professor John McWhirter FREng, FRS
- 2004–2005: Professor Tim Pedley FRS
- 2006–2007: Professor Peter Grindrod CBE
- 2008–2009: Professor David Abrahams
- 2010–2011: Professor Michael Walker OBE, FRS
- 2012–2013: Professor Robert MacKay FRS
- 2014–2015: Professor Dame Celia Hoyles
- 2016–2017: Professor Chris Linton
- 2018–2019: Professor Alistair Fitt
- 2020–2021: Professor Nira Chamberlain OBE
- 2022–2023: Professor Paul Glendinning
- 2024–2025: Professor Hannah Fry HonFREng
- 2026–present: Dr Heather Tewkesbury CMath, FIMA

=== Honorary officers ===
In addition to the president, the six honorary officer roles are listed below with their incumbents:

Honorary officers
Role	Incumbent
Vice President, Business, Industry and Government	Dr Andy Harrison FIMA
Vice President, Communications	Nathan Turner FIMA
Vice President, Learned Society	Eduard Campillo-Funollet MIMA
Honorary Treasurer	Andrew Osbaldestin FIMA
Honorary Secretary, Membership	Paul Glaister
Honorary Secretary, Education	Catherine Hobbs FIMA

== Membership ==
The IMA has around 5,000 members, who live within and outside of the United Kingdom. Members are employed in education (schools through to universities) and in business, industry and governmental organisations. The institute awards five grades of membership within three groups.

=== Advanced membership ===
Fellow (FIMA) Fellows are peer-reviewed by external reference and selected internally through election by the membership committee. Qualifications include a minimum of seven years experience and hold a senior managerial or technical position involving the use of, or training in, mathematics. A Fellow has made outstanding contributions to the development or application of mathematics.

Member (MIMA) Members have an appropriate degree, a minimum period of three years training and experience after graduation and a position of responsibility involving the application of mathematical knowledge or training in mathematics.

=== Leading to Advanced membership ===
Associate Member (AMIMA) Associate Member hold a degree in mathematics, a joint degree in mathematics with another subject or a degree with a sufficient mathematical component such as would be expected in physics or engineering.

Students Student Members are undertaking a course of study which will lead to a qualification that meets Associate Member requirements.

=== Non-professional membership ===
Affiliate No requirements are necessary for entry into this grade.

== Professional status ==
In 1990 the institute was incorporated by royal charter and was subsequently granted the right to award Chartered Mathematician (CMath) status. The institute may also nominate individuals for the award of Chartered Scientist (CSci) under license from the Science Council. The institute can also award individual Chartered Mathematics Teacher (CMathTeach).

== Publications ==
=== Mathematics Today ===
Mathematics Today is a general-interest mathematics publication aimed primarily at Institute members, published six times a year and containing articles, reviews, reports and other news on developments in mathematics and its applications.

=== Research journals ===
Eight research journals are published by Oxford University Press on behalf of the IMA.

- IMA Journal of Applied Mathematics
- IMA Journal of Numerical Analysis
- Mathematical Medicine and Biology
- IMA Journal of Mathematical Control and Information
- IMA Journal of Management Mathematics
- Teaching Mathematics and its Applications
- Information and Inference: A Journal of the IMA
- Transactions of Mathematics and its Applications

=== Other publications ===
The IMA began publishing a podcast, Travels in a Mathematical World, on 4 October 2008. The IMA also publishes conference proceedings, monographs and special interest group newsletters.

== Conferences ==
The institute runs 8–10 conferences most years. These are specialist meetings where new research is presented and discussed.

== Education activities ==
The IMA runs a wide range of mathematical activities through the Higher Education Services Area and the Schools and Further Education Group committees.

The IMA operates a Programme Approval Scheme, which provides an 'approval in principle' for degree courses that meet the educational requirements for Chartered Mathematician. For programmes to be approved, the IMA requires the programme to be an honours degree of at least three years length, which meets the required mathematical content threshold of two-thirds. The programmes also need to meet the QAA benchmark for Mathematics and the Framework for High Education Qualification.

The IMA provides education grants of up to £600 to allow individuals from the UK working in schools or further/higher education to help with the attendance at or the organisation of a mathematics educational activity such as attendance at a conference, expenses to cover a speaker coming into a school, organising a session for a conference.

The IMA also employs a university liaison officer to promote mathematics and the IMA to university students undertaking mathematics and help act as a means of support. As part of this support the IMA runs the University Liaison Grants Scheme to provide university mathematical societies with grants of up to £400 to organise more activities and work more closely with the IMA.

== Prizes ==
The IMA awards the Leslie Fox Prize for Numerical Analysis, the Catherine Richards Prize for the best articles in Mathematics Today, the John Blake University Teaching Medal and the IMA Gold Medal for outstanding contribution to mathematics and its applications over the years.

The IMA awards student-level prizes at most universities which offer mathematics around the UK. Each student prize is a year's membership of the IMA.

The councils of the IMA and the London Mathematical Society jointly award the Christopher Zeeman Medal, dedicated to recognising excellence in the communication of mathematics and the David Crighton Medal dedicated to the recognition of service to mathematics and the wider mathematics community.

The IMA in cooperation with the British Applied Mathematics Colloquium (BAMC) award the biennial IMA Lighthill-Thwaites Prize for early career applied mathematicians.

== Branches ==
The Institute of Mathematics and its Applications (IMA) maintains a network of regional branches across the United Kingdom and Ireland. These branches support the institute's mission by organizing local activities such as lectures, professional development events, and public engagement initiatives, often featuring prominent mathematicians.

As of October 2025, the IMA has the following branches:

East Midlands

Irish

London and South East

North West

Scottish

West Midlands

South West and Wales

Yorkshire

The institute’s headquarters are located in Southend-on-Sea, Essex.

== Early Career Mathematicians Group ==
The Early Career Mathematicians Group of the IMA hold a series of conferences for mathematicians in the first 15 years of their career among other activities.

== Social networking ==
As well as all the conferences, meetings and group activities that are held across the country the IMA operates groups on Facebook and LinkedIn, a YouTube channel and Instagram, Threads and X feeds.

== Interaction with other bodies ==
Along with the London Mathematical Society, the Royal Statistical Society, the Edinburgh Mathematical Society and the Operational Research Society, forms the Council for the Mathematical Sciences. The IMA is a member of the Joint Mathematical Council (JMC) and informs the deliberations of the Advisory Committee on Mathematics Education (ACME).

== See also ==
- List of Mathematical Societies
- Council for the Mathematical Sciences
- Leslie Fox Prize for Numerical Analysis
