= List of learned societies in the United Kingdom =

This is a list of learned societies in the United Kingdom.

- Academy for the Mathematical Sciences
- Academy of Medical Educators
- Academy of Medical Sciences
- Academy of Social Sciences
- Adelphi Genetics Forum
- Advisory Council on Scientific Policy
- African Studies Association of the United Kingdom
- Anatomical Society
- Ancient India and Iran Trust
- Ancient Monuments Society
- Anglo-Norman Text Society
- Anthropological Society of London
- Applied Microbiology International
- Applied Probability Trust
- Aristotelian Society
- Association for Art History
- Association for Learning Technology
- Association for Nutrition
- Association for Psychosocial Studies
- Association for the Scientific Study of Anomalous Phenomena
- Association of Business Historians
- Association of Social Anthropologists
- Association of Teachers of Mathematics
- Astrobiology Society of Britain
- Bibliographical Society
- Biochemical Society
- Botanical Society of Britain and Ireland
- British Academy
- British Academy of Management
- British Accounting & Finance Association
- British Arachnological Society
- British Archaeological Association
- British Association for American Studies
- British Association for Applied Linguistics
- British Association for Counselling and Psychotherapy
- British Association for International & Comparative Education
- British Association for International and Comparative Education
- British Association for Slavonic & East European Studies
- British Bryological Society
- British Cartographic Society
- British Committee on the Theory of International Politics
- British Computer Society
- British Ecological Society
- British Educational Research Association
- British Herpetological Society
- British Horological Institute
- British International Studies Association
- British Interplanetary Society
- British Kinematograph, Sound and Television Society
- British Logic Colloquium
- British Mass Spectrometry Society
- British Medical Association
- British Mycological Society
- British Naturalists' Association
- British Occupational Hygiene Society
- British Pharmacological Society
- British Philosophical Association
- British Plant Gall Society
- British Psychological Society
- British Psychotherapy Foundation
- British Records Association
- British Record Society
- British Science Association
- British Society for Antimicrobial Chemotherapy
- British Society for Eighteenth-Century Studies
- British Society for Geomorphology
- British Society for Phenomenology
- British Society for Population Studies
- British Society for Research into Learning Mathematics
- British Society for Research on Ageing
- British Society for Surgery of the Hand
- British Society for the History of Mathematics
- British Society for the History of Medicine
- British Society for the History of Science
- British Society for the Philosophy of Religion
- British Society for the Philosophy of Science
- British Society of Aesthetics
- British Society of Animal Science
- British Society of Criminology
- British Society of Gerontology
- British Sociological Association
- British Thoracic Society
- British Toxicology Society
- Burgon Society
- Cambrian Archaeological Association
- Cambridge Philosophical Society
- Cambridge University Moral Sciences Club
- The Cannibal Club
- Canterbury and York Society
- Catholic Record Society
- The Central Institute London
- Centre for Applied Philosophy, Politics and Ethics
- Challenger Society for Marine Science
- Chartered Institute of Arbitrators
- Chartered Institute of Ergonomics and Human Factors
- Chartered Institute of Linguists
- Chartered Institute of Marketing
- Chartered Institution of Civil Engineering Surveyors
- Chartered Institution of Highways and Transportation
- Chartered Management Institute
- Chartered Society of Designers
- Chatham House
- Classical Association
- Clinical Society of London
- The Colour Group
- The Company of Biologists
- Construction History Society
- Council for Scientific Policy
- Council for the Mathematical Sciences
- Cybernetics Society
- Design Research Society
- Development Studies Association
- Devonshire Association
- Dipterists Forum
- Dracula Society
- Early English Text Society
- Ecclesiastical History Society
- Economic History Society
- Edinburgh Geological Society
- Edinburgh Mathematical Society
- English Place-Name Society
- Ethnological Society of London
- European Academy of Occupational Health Psychology
- European Society for Neurochemistry
- The Facilities Society
- Faculty of Medical Leadership and Management
- Faculty of Occupational Medicine
- Faculty of Public Health
- The Folklore Society
- Freshwater Biological Association
- Friends of Herculaneum Society
- The Genetics Society
- Geological Curators' Group
- Geological Society of London
- Geologists' Association
- Government Economic Service
- Hadrianic Society
- Hakluyt Society
- Hampstead Scientific Society
- Hegel Society of Great Britain
- Henry Bradshaw Society
- The Heraldry Society
- Heraldry Society of Scotland
- Historical Association
- Historical Metallurgy Society
- Honourable Society of Cymmrodorion
- Hunterian Society
- Indian Military Historical Society
- Information Design Association
- Institute and Faculty of Actuaries
- Institute of Chartered Shipbrokers
- The Institute of Ergonomics and Human Factors
- Institute of Marine Engineering, Science and Technology
- Institute of Mathematics and its Applications
- Institute of Measurement and Control
- Institute of Physics
- Institution of Chemical Engineers
- Institution of Civil Engineers
- Institution of Electrical Engineers
- Institution of Engineering and Technology
- Institution of Engineers and Shipbuilders in Scotland
- Institution of Mechanical Engineers
- International Association for Jungian Studies
- Irish Genealogical Research Society
- Jan Hus Educational Foundation
- John Snow Society
- Joint Mathematical Council
- Joint University Council of the Applied Social Sciences
- Learned Society of Wales
- Lincoln Philosophy Café
- Linnean Society of London
- List and Index Society
- Literary and Philosophical Society of Newcastle upon Tyne
- London Institute of 'Pataphysics
- London Mathematical Society
- London Positivist Society
- Malone Society
- The Mammal Society
- Manchester Statistical Society
- Marine Biological Association of the United Kingdom
- Mathematical Association
- Medical Research Society
- Metaphysical Society
- Microbiology Society
- Mind Association
- Modern Humanities Research Association
- National Association for the Promotion of Social Science
- Navy Records Society
- Neonatal Society
- Newcomen Society
- North of England Institute of Mining and Mechanical Engineers
- Oriental Ceramic Society
- Oxford Philosophical Club
- Pathological Society
- Philological Society
- Philosophical Society of England
- Philosophy For All
- Philosophy of Education Society of Great Britain
- The Physiological Society
- Plainsong and Medieval Music Society
- Polish Institute and Sikorski Museum
- Political Economy Club (1909)
- Political Studies Association
- The Prehistoric Society
- Recusant History
- Regional Science Association International
- Regional Studies Association
- Register of Clinical Technologists
- Remote Sensing and Photogrammetry Society
- The Roman Society
- Royal Academy of Arts
- Royal Academy of Engineering
- Royal Aeronautical Society
- Royal Anthropological Institute of Great Britain and Ireland
- Royal Archaeological Institute
- Royal Asiatic Society of Great Britain and Ireland
- Royal Astronomical Society
- Royal Astronomical Society
- Royal College of Emergency Medicine
- Royal College of Nursing
- Royal College of Paediatrics and Child Health
- Royal College of Paramedics
- Royal College of Pathologists
- Royal College of Physicians
- Royal College of Physicians, London
- Royal College of Physicians of Edinburgh
- Royal College of Physicians of Ireland
- Royal College of Speech and Language Therapists
- Royal College of Surgeons of Edinburgh
- Royal College of Surgeons of England
- Royal Economic Society
- Royal Entomological Society
- Royal Geographical Society
- Royal Historical Society
- Royal Institute of British Architects
- Royal Institute of Navigation
- Royal Institute of Philosophy
- Royal Institute of Public Health
- Royal Institution
- Royal Institution of Chartered Surveyors
- Royal Institution of South Wales
- Royal Manchester Institution
- Royal Meteorological Society
- Royal Microscopical Society
- Royal Numismatic Society
- Royal Pharmaceutical Society
- Royal Philatelic Society London
- Royal Photographic Society
- Royal Scottish Geographical Society
- Royal Society
- Royal Society for Asian Affairs
- Royal Society of Arts
- Royal Society of Biology
- Royal Society of Chemistry
- Royal Society of Edinburgh
- Royal Society of Literature
- Royal Society of Medicine
- Royal Statistical Society
- Royal Town Planning Institute
- Scottish Economic Society
- The Security Institute
- Selden Society
- Social Policy Association
- Social Research Association
- Society for Applied Philosophy
- The Society for Court Studies
- Society for Endocrinology
- Society for Experimental Biology
- Society for French Studies
- Society for Medieval Archaeology
- Society for Name Studies in Britain and Ireland
- Society for Old Testament Study
- Society for Psychical Research
- Society for Research into Higher Education
- Society for Social Medicine
- Society for the Encouragement of Arts, Manufactures and Commerce
- Society for the History of Astronomy
- Society for the Promotion of Byzantine Studies
- Society for the Promotion of Hellenic Studies
- Society for the Promotion of Roman Studies
- Society for the Social History of Medicine
- Society for the Study of Christian Ethics
- Society for the Study of Medieval Languages and Literature
- Society for the Study of Theology
- Society for Underwater Technology
- Society of Analytical Psychology
- Society of Antiquaries of London
- Society of Antiquaries of Scotland
- Society of Architectural Historians of Great Britain
- Society of Biblical Archaeology
- Society of Chemical Industry
- The Society of Legal Scholars
- Society of Science, Letters and Art
- Society of Scribes & Illuminators
- Society of Women Writers and Journalists
- South Wales Institute of Engineers
- Surtees Society
- Systematics Association
- Thomas Merton Society of Great Britain and Ireland
- Trinity Mathematical Society
- UK Academy for Information Systems
- UK Evaluation Society
- UK Society for Co-operative Studies
- Utopian Studies Society
- Voluntary Action History Society
- Walpole Society
- William Morris Society
- Worcestershire Archaeological Society
- Yorkshire Architectural and York Archaeological Society
- York Virtuosi
- Zoological Society of London
