= Roger Jowell =

British sociologist (1942–2011)

Sir Roger Jowell CBE
- Born: Roger Mark Jowell; 26 March 1942; Cape Town, Union of South Africa
- Died: 25 December 2011 (aged 69); St Briavels, England
- Education: University of Cape Town
- Spouses: Tessa Palmer (m. 1970; div. 1977); Rani Gilani (m. 1977; div. 1995); Sharon Witherspoon (m. 1996)
- Children: 2
- Scientific career
- Fields: Social statistics
- Workplaces: Research Services Limited; National Centre for Social Research; City University

Sir Roger Mark Jowell, CBE (26 March 1942 – 25 December 2011) was a British social statistician and academic who founded the National Centre for Social Research (formerly Social and Community Planning Research) and the Centre for Comparative Social Surveys at City University. He played a leading role in the establishment of several of the UK's leading social surveys, most famously the British Social Attitudes and the British Election Study. He made a major contribution to the development of robust comparative research through the International Social Survey Programme and the European Social Survey.

== Early life and education ==
Roger Mark Jowell was born on 26 March 1942 to a Jewish family in Cape Town, the second son of Emily Katzenellenbogen and Jack Jowell. In his youth, he was active in left-wing politics becoming President of Cape Town's Student Representative Council and vice-president of the National Union of South African Students.

"As soon as I graduated from the University of Cape Town in 1964, I came to Britain – initially just to gain a broader perspective on my life. It wasn't that I had to leave, although as President of the Students' Union I'd been heavily involved in student politics and anti-apartheid activities. At that time students were more or less immune from prosecution. But then things changed, and a few months after I arrived in Britain I got word that many of my close friends had been arrested. I realised then that I couldn't go back – it wouldn't have been safe. Once I got my British passport, I was able to go back fairly regularly."

== Research career ==
In Britain, Jowell was active in anti-apartheid activities and in the Labour Party, becoming Alderman in Camden in 1970. He began his research career at Research Services Limited, mentored by Mark Abrams. In 1969, with Gerald Hoinville he founded the London-based Social and Community Planning Research, which became the National Centre for Social Research, He led the organisation for over 30 years.

At Social and Community Planning Research, Jowell established the long-running survey series British Social Attitudes and was closely involved as author and editor in its first nineteen annual reports. He co-directed the British Election Study from 1983 to 2000 and was the founding chair of the International Social Survey Programme from 1984 to 1989. His interest in high quality comparative research grew and in 2002, he and Max Kaase established the European Social Survey alongside a group of leading international experts.

=== Academic life ===
In 2003, Jowell became Research Professor and Founder Director of the Centre for Comparative Social Surveys at City University (now City, University of London), London from where he continued to lead the Central Coordinating Team of the European Social Survey until his death. The success of this ambitious 34 nation comparative study was recognised in 2005 when it was awarded the Descartes Prize for excellence in collaborative scientific research, the first time a social science venture has won Europe's top annual science award. Jowell lectured and published widely.

=== Social science community ===
Jowell made significant contributions to the social science community. In 1978 he initiated the establishment of the Social Research Association. In the 1980s he played a key role in developing a professional code of ethics through the International Statistical Institute. , insisting that it should be an educative rather than a prescriptive code. In 2008 he became deputy chair of the board of the UK Statistics Authority advising on the promotion and safeguarding of the publication of official statistics.

== Recognition ==
Jowell was appointed a CBE in 2001 and was knighted in the 2008 New Year Honours for services to social science. He served for two years as vice-president of the Royal Statistical Society and was awarded the Market Research Society Gold Medal.

=== Sir Roger Jowell Memorial Lecture ===
Since 2014, City, University of London has held an annual lecture his memory.

- 2014: Sir Andrew Dilnot (UK Statistics Authority).
- 2015: Professor John Curtice.
- 2016: Professor Dame Anne Johnson (University College London).
- 2017: Professor Anand Menon (UK in a Changing Europe, the Policy Institute, King’s College London).
- 2018: Professor Jane Green (University of Manchester).
- 2019: Professor Alissa Goodman (University College London) & the Rt Hon David Laws (Education Policy Institute).
- 2020: Professor Sir Michael Marmot (Institute of Health Equity, University College London).
- 2021: Paul Johnson CBE (Institute for Fiscal Studies).
- 2022: Professor Rosie Campbell (King's College London).
- 2023: Professor Robert Ford (University of Manchester).
- 2025: Professor Jane Falkingham CBE (ESRC Centre for Population Change, University of Southampton).
- 2026: Professor Bobby Duffy (Policy Institute, King's College London).

== Personal life ==
In 1970, Jowell married Tessa Palmer, a psychiatric social worker and fellow Camden London Borough Councillor, in Hampstead, London. She went on to become a member of parliament and minister in Tony Blair's and Gordon Brown's cabinets. They divorced in 1977. In 1979, he married Nighat (Rani) Gilani in Camden. They have two sons, Marco and Adam, and divorced in 1995. In 1996, he married Sharon Witherspoon, who was Director of the Nuffield Foundation, and had previously been a colleague at SCPR, in the Forest of Dean, Gloucestershire. Jowell's older brother is the lawyer Sir Jeffrey Jowell, who also settled in the UK. Jowell lived in St Briavels, Gloucestershire, and died at home from a heart attack on 25 December 2011, at the age of 69.
