= Alison Park =

British social scientist

Alison Park CBE FAcSS
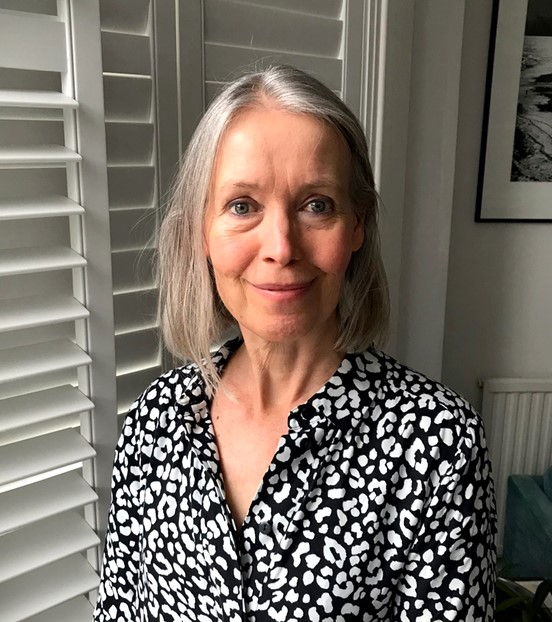
- Park as executive chair of the ESRC in 2021
- Born: Alison Macdonald Park
- Education: Bristol Polytechnic; University of Oxford
- Scientific career
- Fields: Attitudes; Longitudinal studies Cohort studies
- Workplaces: University College London; Economic and Social Research Council
- Thesis: Women working in higher education (1991)
- Website: iris.ucl.ac.uk/iris/browse/profile?upi=APARK85

Alison Macdonald Park CBE FAcSS is a British social scientist and professor who served as executive chair of the Economic and Social Research Council (ESRC) from 2021 to 2023. Her research has focused on longitudinal data collection and social attitudes. She was appointed a Commander of the Order of the British Empire (CBE) in the 2019 New Year Honours for services to the Social Sciences.

== Early life and education ==
Park grew up in a literary family, with an academic as a father and a mother who worked in publishing. She studied social science at Bristol Polytechnic before moving to Nuffield College, Oxford as a graduate student, where she completed a Master of Philosophy (MPhil) degree in sociology. For her dissertation she explored data from a survey of academic careers overseen by A. H. Halsey and the career progression of women academics.

== Research and career ==
Park joined Social and Community Planning Research, now known as the National Centre for Social Research, in the early nineties and later went on to set up its Scottish office, ScotCen Social Research. She worked for a number of years on the British Social Attitudes survey and the British Election Study as well as overseeing, designing and analysing other major UK surveys.

Park joined the UCL Institute of Education as Director of Cohort and Longitudinal Studies Enhancement Resources (CLOSER) project in 2015 as Professor of Social Research. CLOSER brings together the British Library and UK Data Service to coordinate longitudinal surveys and maximise understanding of social and biomedical issues.

Park became director of research of the Economic and Social Research Council (ESRC) in 2019. She was appointed interim Executive Chair in 2021.

Park became a trustee of the National Centre for Social Research in November 2025.

=== Awards and honours ===
Park was appointed a Commander of the British Empire (CBE) in the 2019 New Year Honours for services to the Social Sciences.
