= Sharon Witherspoon =

British statistician

Sharon Fae Witherspoon, Lady Jowell MBE FAcSS (born 1956) is a British statistician serving as Head of Policy of the Academy of Social Sciences and the Campaign for Social Science, and as a member of the Review Body on Senior Salaries of the British government. For four years, she was Vice President for Education and Statistical Literacy of the Royal Statistical Society.

== Education and career ==
Witherspoon went to high school in the United States, and earned a degree in sociology at an American university, before her postgraduate study of historical sociology at the London School of Economics. She worked for a market research firm before becoming a researcher at Social and Community Planning Research, which later became the National Centre for Social Research (NatCen). At NatCen, Witherspoon was one of the initial researchers of the British Social Attitudes Survey. She worked for the Nuffield Foundation from 1996 to 2015, and was director of the foundation from 2012 until 2015. She moved to the Academy of Social Sciences in 2016.

== Recognition ==
Witherspoon is a Fellow of the Academy of Social Sciences (2010). She became a Member of the Order of the British Empire in 2008. In 2011, she was awarded the President's Medal of the British Academy. In 2015, University College London gave her an honorary doctorate.

== Personal life ==
Witherspoon married one of her collaborators on the British Social Attitudes Survey, statistician Sir Roger Jowell (as his third wife), in 1996; he died in 2011.
