= Academy of Social Sciences (disambiguation) =

The Academy of Social Sciences is a learned society in the United Kingdom.

Academy of Social Sciences may also refer to:

- Chinese Academy of Social Sciences
- Pontifical Academy of Social Sciences
- Shanghai Academy of Social Sciences

== See also ==
- Academician
- Academy of the Social Sciences in Australia
- Campaign for Social Science
- Learned society
- Social sciences
