= Jill Hooks =

New Zealand accountancy academic

Jill Hooks CNZM
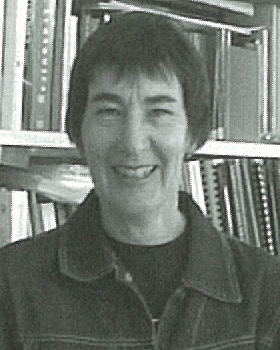
- Hooks in 2003
- Education: University of Waikato
- Scientific career
- Fields: Accountancy; financial reporting; human capital flight
- Workplaces: Massey University
- Thesis: Accountability in the retail and distribution sectors of the New Zealand electricity industry (2000)

Jillian Jeanette Hooks CNZM is a New Zealand accountancy academic. She was a professor at Massey University and published a number of books and papers on accounting and financial reporting. In December 2024, Hooks was appointed a Companion of the New Zealand Order of Merit for services to accountancy and education.

== Academic career ==
Hooks completed a PhD in 2000 at the University of Waikato titled Accountability in the retail and distribution sectors of the New Zealand electricity industry, and the electricity sector in New Zealand remains a strong research topic for her. She works at Massey University, where she is a full professor. Other research interests include reporting (both industry, charities and public sector) and talent flows. Hooks is a chartered accountant of the New Zealand Institute of Chartered Accountants, a Fellow Certified Practising Accountant of CPA Australia, and a convenor of the annual Auckland Region Accounting Conference. She is on the editorial board of Pacific Accounting Review and a member of the trust for that journal.

In 2011, Hooks was voted lecturer of the year by students.

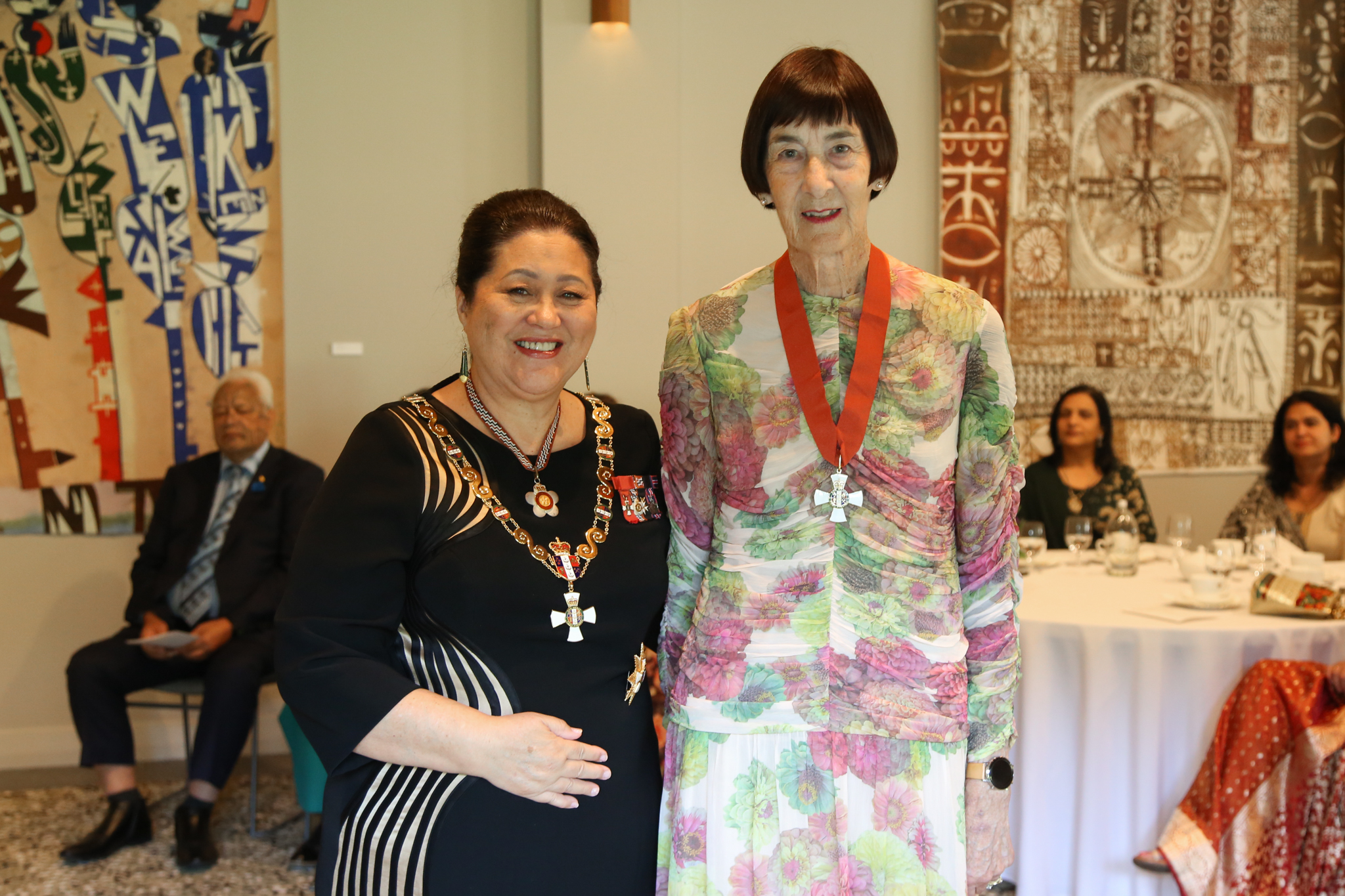
Hooks (right), after her investiture as a Companion of the New Zealand Order of Merit by the governor-general, Dame Cindy Kiro, at Government House, Auckland, on 20 May 2025

In the 2025 New Year Honours, Hooks was appointed a Companion of the New Zealand Order of Merit, for services to accountancy and education.

== Selected works ==
- Hooks, Jill, David Coy, and Howard Davey. "The information gap in annual reports." Accounting, Auditing & Accountability Journal 15, no. 4 (2002): 501–522.
- van Staden, Chris J., and Jill Hooks. "A comprehensive comparison of corporate environmental reporting and responsiveness." The British accounting review 39, no. 3 (2007): 197–210.
- Hooks, Jill, and Chris J. van Staden. "Evaluating environmental disclosures: The relationship between quality and extent measures." The British Accounting Review 43, no. 3 (2011): 200–213.
- Stent, Warwick, Michael Bradbury, and Jill Hooks. "IFRS in New Zealand: effects on financial statements and ratios." Pacific accounting review 22, no. 2 (2010): 92–107.
- Inkson, Kerr, Stuart Carr, Margot Edwards, Jill Hooks, Duncan Jackson, Kaye Thorn, and Nicola Allfree. "From brain drain to talent flow: Views of Kiwi expatriates." University of Auckland Business Review 6, no. 2 (2004): 29–39.
- Emery, Michelle, Jill Hooks, and Ross Stewart. "Born at the wrong time? An oral history of women professional accountants in New Zealand." Accounting History 7, no. 2 (2002): 7–34.
- Tooley, Stuart, Jill Hooks, and Norida Basnan. "Performance reporting by Malaysian local authorities: identifying stakeholder needs." Financial Accountability & Management 26, no. 2 (2010): 103–133.
- Michael Bradbury, Jill Hooks, (2013) "Pacific Accounting Review – the first 25 years", Pacific accounting review, Vol. 25 Iss: 3, pp. 225–234
