= Angela Dale =

British social scientist and statistician

Angela Dale OBE FAcSS (born 1945) is a British social scientist and statistician whose research has involved the secondary analysis of government survey data, and the study of women in the workforce. Formerly Deputy Director of the Social Statistics Research Unit of City, University of London, and Professor of Quantitative Research and Director of the Cathie Marsh Centre for Census and Survey Research at the University of Manchester, she is now a professor emerita at Manchester.

== Selected publications ==
Dale is an author of the books;

- Doing Secondary Analysis: A Practical Guide (with Sara Arber and Michael Proctor, Unwin Hyman, 1988)
- Analyzing Census Microdata (with Ed Fieldhouse and Claire Holdsworth, Edward Arnold, 2000)

She is an editor of

- The 1991 Census User's Guide (edited with Cathie Marsh, HMSO 1993)
- Analysing Social and Political Change: A Casebook of Methods (with Richard B. Davies, Sage, 1994)
- The Gender Dimension of Social Change: The Contribution of Dynamic Research to the Study of Women's Life Courses (with Elisabetta Ruspini, Policy Press, 2002)
- Understanding Social Research: Thinking Creatively about Method (with Jennifer Mason, Sage, 2011)

She has also published highly cited journal papers on women in the workforce including

- Dale, Angela; Gilbert, G. Nigel; Arber, Sara (August 1985), "Integrating Women into Class Theory", Sociology, 19 (3): 384–408, doi:10.1177/0038038585019003004, S2CID 143069884
- Arber, Sara; Gilbert, G. Nigel; Dale, Angela (November 1985), "Paid employment and women's health: a benefit or a source of role strain?", Sociology of Health & Illness, 7 (3): 375–400, doi:10.1111/1467-9566.ep10834014
- Ginn, Jay; Arber, Sara; Brannen, Julia; Dale, Angela; Dex, Shirley; Elias, Peter; Moss, Peter; Pahl, Jan; Roberts, Ceridwen; Rubery, Jill (March 1996), "Feminist Fallacies: A Reply to Hakim on Women's Employment", The British Journal of Sociology, 47 (1): 167–74, doi:10.2307/591122, JSTOR 591122, PMID 8680791
- Dale, Angela; Shaheen, Nusrat; Kalra, Virinder; Fieldhouse, Edward (January 2002), "Routes into education and employment for young Pakistani and Bangladeshi women in the UK", Ethnic and Racial Studies, 25 (6): 942–968, doi:10.1080/0141987022000009386, hdl:10068/539699, S2CID 145417372
- Dale, Angela; Fieldhouse, E.; Shaheen, Nusrat; Kalra, Virinder (March 2002), "The Labour Market Prospects for Pakistani and Bangladeshi Women", Work, Employment and Society, 16 (1): 5–25, doi:10.1177/09500170222119227, hdl:10068/539723, S2CID 154928169

== Recognition ==
Dale is a Fellow of the Academy of Social Sciences. She was named to the Order of the British Empire in the 2006 New Year Honours "for services to social science". In 2006, Dale won the West Medal of the Royal Statistical Society, given "for outstanding contributions to the development or communication of official statistics".
