= Homery Folkes =

British archaeologist and architect

John Homery Folkes FRIBA (1906–2000) was an English architect, archaeologist, and local historian.

== Biography ==
Homery Folkes was born on 9 May 1906 at Pedmore, Worcestershire. He was the youngest son of Hugh Ernest Folkes, a Stourbridge architect and surveyor, and his wife May Isabel Draper.

After training at the Birmingham School of Architects in the mid-1920s, Folkes began working as an architect in the family firm of Folkes & Folkes of Hagley Road, Stourbridge, and was elected as a Fellow of the Royal Institute of British Architects in 1930. He designed several noted buildings in north Worcestershire, including the West Lodge of Hagley Hall in 1953-4 and St Saviour's Church Hall in Hagley in 1971–2. During the 1930s he was commissioned by the Stourbridge glass manufacturer Thomas Webb & Sons, and was credited with producing a number of innovative designs for the firm.

Folkes had a long interest in the archaeology and local history of Worcestershire and the Black Country. He joined the Worcestershire Archaeological Society in 1928, serving on the committee from 1974. In 1946 he became a founding member of the Stourbridge Historical and Archaeological Society, and held the Society's presidency from 1951 to 1953. He wrote a book and several articles on the architecture and history of Hagley, and played an active role in local conservation, undertaking repairs to the medieval church of St Leonard at Cotheridge in 1961 and the Regency-era church of St Andrew at Ombersley in 1957. For several years he served as an advisor to the management committee of Harvington Hall.

Folkes assembled a large collection of historical papers and newspaper clippings, which were donated to the Worcestershire County Record Office.

Folkes died on 30 October 2000 at Clent.

== Selected publications ==
=== Books ===
- Folkes, J.H., Hagley Miscellanea (Hagley, 1974)
- Folkes, J.H., The Matley Moores and myself and others (Worcester, 1997)

=== Articles ===
- Beard, G., and Folkes, J.H., 'John Chute and Hagley Hall', Architectural Review (March 1952), 199–200.
- Folkes, J.H., 'The Victorian Architect & George Edmund Street', Transactions of the Worcestershire Archaeological Society 3S 4 (1974), 7–18.
- Folkes, D.N., and Folkes, J.H., 'A Royal Wedding in Worcestershire', Transactions of the Worcestershire Archaeological Society 3S 8 (1982), 47–58.
- Folkes, J.H., 'This Unpleasant Business', Worcestershire Archaeology and Local History Newsletter 33 (1984), 18–21.
- Folkes, J.H., 'Recollections and Reflections on the Worcestershire Archaeological Society', Transactions of the Worcestershire Archaeological Society 3S 17 (2000), 293–302.
