= Jennifer Mason =

Jennifer Mason may refer to:

- Jennifer Mason (sociologist), British sociologist
- Jennifer Mason (Haven), fictional character
- Jennifer Mason (Shortland Street), fictional character
- Jennifer Mason, fictional character in The Following
