= VAHS =

VAHS may refer to:

== Schools ==
- Vail Academy and High School, Tucson, Arizona, United States
- Verona Area High School, Verona, Wisconsin, United States
- Vicenza American High School, a United States Department of Defense Dependent School in Vicenza, Italy

== Other uses ==
- Victorian Aboriginal Health Service, Melbourne, Australia, co-founded by Alma Thorpe
- Voice for Animals Humane Society, a Canadian non-profit organisation
- Voluntary Action History Society, a British learned society
