= Humanities, arts, and social sciences =

Group of academic disciplines

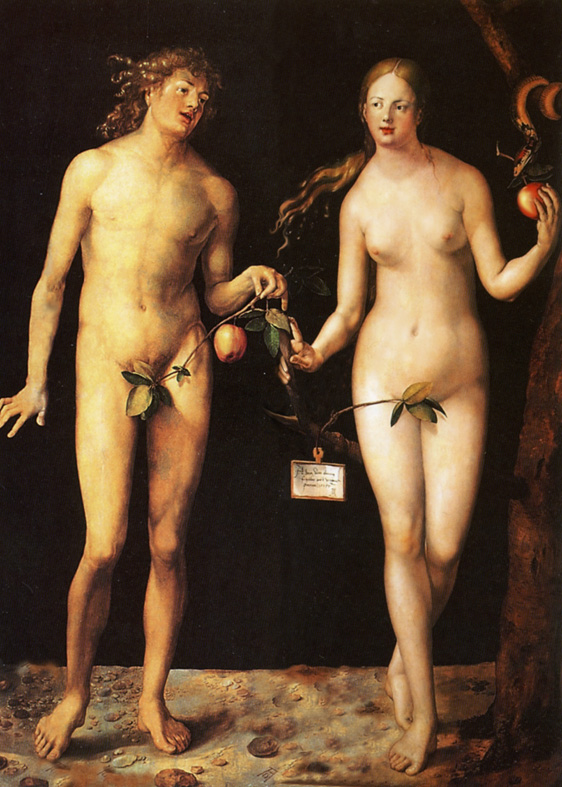
Pictographic representation of Adam and Eve

Humanities, Arts, and Social Sciences (HASS) (or Arts, Humanities and Social Sciences, AHSS), also known as social studies, is a broad term that groups together the academic disciplines of humanities, arts and social sciences. It is viewed as an academic counterpart to Science, Technology, Engineering, and Mathematics (STEM) in the Australia, Canada, India, the United States, and other countries. HASS graduates comprise the majority of the workforce in many developed countries (e.g. 64% in Australia). However, HASS courses often receive lower governmental funding and may have lower reputations within universities. There is a measured relationship between citizens' HASS awareness with more accurate threat perceptions, high community activity, and cultural engagement at the local level. In recent years, a return to a holistic reintegration of HASS and STEM disciplines has been promoted in the U.S. by the National Academies of Sciences, Engineering, and Medicine.

Some of the disciplines it covers are philosophy, theology, sociology, communication sciences, social psychology, human geography, demography, anthropology, social work, linguistics, history, archaeology, politics, economics, law, pedagogy, journalism, literature, musicology, administration, accounting, commerce, music, dance, painting, sculpture, graphic design, theater, cinematography, interior design, industrial design, criticism, art history, cultural studies, tourism, gastronomy, among others.

In the Philippines, a similar term called humanities and social sciences (HumSS) is used to describe a senior high strand that involves the liberal arts. This strand was set up in place as part of the K-12 program that was implemented in the country.

== History ==
In 2020, an initiative in the UK rebranded the HASS acronym for humanities, the arts and social sciences as SHAPE (Social Sciences, Humanities and the Arts for People and the Economy), to promote and highlight the importance of these subjects in education, society, and the economy.

== See also ==
- Social studies
