= Dennis Bromley =

British gerontologist

Dennis Basil Bromley
- Born: 1924
- Died: 2015 (aged 90–91)
- Citizenship: British
- Education: University of Liverpool
- Scientific career
- Fields: Psychology, Gerontology
- Workplaces: University of Liverpool
- Thesis: Ageing and intellect (1962)

Dennis Basil Bromley (1924-27 April 2015) was a British psychologist with particular expertise in psychological aspects of human ageing.

== Career ==
During the Second World War he was in the Royal Air Force. After the war he returned to university and obtained a BA and PhD in psychology. He was then appointed a junior lecturer in the Department of Psychology at the University of Liverpool and proceeded through the ranks from lecturer to full Professor and Head of the Department. On his retirement in 1989 he was granted the title of Emeritus Professor. The Department established Dennis Basil Bromley Prize for High Academic Achievement in Psychological Aspects of Human Ageing.

== Research ==
Bradley was particularly interested in the psychology of human ageing and published extensively in this field. Penguin Books published his first book on The Psychology of Ageing in 1966 and a second edition was published in 1974. He subsequently published a follow-up entitled Behavioural Gerontology. He was a Founding Fellow of the British Society of Social and Behavioural Gerontology (subsequently renamed the British Society of Gerontology). A detailed account of his career was published in a collection on the history of gerontology.

He also published a series of books on person perception, popular personality description and impression management. Finally, he published a popular text-book on the case-study method.

== Awards ==
- Fellow, British Psychological Society
- Fellow, Gerontological Society of America
- Founding Fellow and Chair, British Society of Gerontology

== Publications ==
- Reputation, Image and Impression Management (Wiley, 1993)
- Behavioural Gerontology (Wiley, 1990)
- The Case-study Method in Psychology and Related Disciplines (Wiley, 1986).
- Personality Description in Ordinary Language (1977)
- Person perception in childhood and adolescence (with W.J. Livesley) (Wiley, 1973).
- The Psychology of Human Ageing (Penguin, 1966, 1974)
