= Jennifer Mason (sociologist) =

British sociologist

Jennifer Mason FBA (b. 1958) is a British sociologist and professor emerita of Sociology at the University of Manchester.

== Biography ==
Mason studied for her undergraduate degree in sociology at the University of Southampton and a PhD at the University of Kent. She worked as a lecturer at Lancaster University before being appointed Reader in Sociology at the University of Leeds. In 2005 she moved to the University of Manchester and co-founded The Morgan Centre for Research into Everyday Lives with Carol Smart. Mason has served as the vice-chair of the Economic and Social Research Council's research committee and acted as Chair of the ESRC Grants Delivery Group from 2012 to 2015. She was elected as a fellow of the British Academy in 2019.

== Select publications ==
- Mason, J. 2017. Affinities: Potent Connections in Personal Life, Polity.
- Mason, J. 2017 Qualitative Researching (third edition). SAGE.
- Mason, J. (ed). 2016. Living the Weather: Voices from the Calder Valley. University of Manchester.
- Mason, J. and Dale, A. 2010. Understanding Social Research: Thinking Creatively about Method. SAGE.
