= E. A. B. Barnard =

British antiquarian and historian

Ettwell Augustine Bracher Barnard (1872 – 1953) was an English antiquarian, local historian, and genealogist.

== Biography ==
Barnard was born on 12 March 1872 at Evesham, Worcestershire. He was the eldest son of Charles Barnard, an English naval lieutenant, and his wife Annie Esther Ettwell. He was raised by his grandmother, Jane Croker Ettwell Bracher, and her second husband Jethro Bracher, who was manager of the Worcester City and County Bank (later Lloyds Bank) on Evesham High Street. After graduating from Prince Henry's Grammar School, he worked with his grandfather as a bank assistant, and enjoyed an active middle-class social life marked by opera performances, freemasonry, and holidays throughout Europe. He married his wife, Elizabeth Fyson, in 1921, and two years later the couple relocated to Cambridge, where they lived until his death on 16 February 1953. In 1951 Barnard had been made an honorary freeman of Evesham, in recognition of "his long service to the Borough as its foremost historian".

== Works ==
Despite his lack of a university education, Barnard was noted for his antiquarian and historical interests, which he pursued as an independent scholar from the 1890s onwards. In 1906 he produced the first of what became more than 1600 antiquarian columns in the Evesham Journal, published under the heading of 'Notes and Queries' (1906–16) and 'Old Days in and around Evesham' (1918–52). His research interests were wide-ranging, but centred mainly on the Vale of Evesham, church and secular architecture, and the history of Worcestershire's gentry families. He was an active member of the Worcestershire Archaeological Society, serving as its president in 1923–5 and Editor of its Transactions in 1924–49, as well as the Cambridge Antiquarian Society, which he served as Secretary and Editor of its Proceedings in 1931–6. During the 1940s he also held the post of Vice President of the Royal Archaeological Institute.

Barnard gained a significant reputation for his work with historic documents, and led a number of projects cataloguing and transcribing medieval and early modern records held by private families, churches, and other institutions. During the 1920s he undertook extensive work on the collection of Worcestershire documents, artefacts, and illustrations bequeathed to the Society of Antiquaries by the Bewdley antiquarian Peter Prattinton (1776-1840), publishing the first modern catalogue in 1931. By 1930 he began cataloguing the muniments of St Catharine's College, Cambridge, for which he was awarded an honorary Master of Arts in 1935. During the last decade of his life served as the Keeper of Records for the Bishop of Ely. He played an important early role in raising awareness of the threats to historic documents, and persuaded the owners of several private collections to loan them to public record offices.

Barnard's contributions to historical scholarship were recognised by several Learned Societies. In 1912 he was elected as a Fellow of the Society of Antiquaries, and three years later was made a Fellow of the Royal Historical Society.

== Selected publications ==
=== Books ===
- Barnard, E.A.B., Evesham and Four Shires Notes and Queries, 3 vols (Evesham, 1911–14)
- Barnard, E.A.B., Churchwardens' Accounts of the Parish of South Littleton, 1548-1693 (Worcester, 1926)
- Barnard, E.A.B., The Prattinton Collection of Worcestershire History (Evesham, 1931)
- Barnard, E.A.B., The Sheldons: Being Some Account of the Sheldon Family of Worcestershire and Warwickshire (Cambridge, 1936)
- Barnard, E.A.B., Alumni Cantabrigienses. Part II, 1752-1900 (Cambridge, 1940)
- Barnard, E.A.B., A Seventeenth Century Country Gentleman: Sir Francis Throckmorton, 1640-1680 (Cambridge, 1944)

=== Articles ===
- Barnard, E.A.B., 'The Incorporation of Evesham: a Study of the Foundation of the Municipal Borough in the 17th Century', Transactions of the Birmingham Archaeological Society 37 (1911), 1–15.
- Barnard, E.A.B., 'The Church and Rectory of Buckland, Co. Gloucester', Transactions of the Bristol and Gloucestershire Archaeological Society 45 (1923), 71-85
- Barnard, E.A.B., 'Clement Lichfield, last Abbot of Evesham', Transactions of the Worcestershire Archaeological Society 1S 5 (1927-8), 38-51
- Barnard, E.A.B., 'The Rouses of Rous Lench', Transactions of the Worcestershire Archaeological Society 1S 9 (1932), 31-74
- Barnard, E.A.B., 'John Warkworth (circa 1425–1500) and his Chapel in St Mary the Less, Cambridge', Proceedings of the Cambridge Antiquarian Society 35 (1934-5), 131-135
- Barnard, E.A.B., 'The last days of Dr Peter Prattinton', Transactions of the Worcestershire Archaeological Society 1S 14 (1937), 61-68
