= Cathie Marsh =

Sociologist and statistician

Catherine "Cathie" Marsh (née Suggitt) (17 February 1951 – 1 January 1993) was a British sociologist and statistician. She was a professor at the University of Manchester, and published two books on surveying in sociology and using statistics in social science. The Cathie Marsh Institute for Social Research (CMIST) at the University of Manchester was named after her, and the Social Research Association holds an annual Cathie Marsch Memorial Lecture.

== Career ==
Marsh was born on 17 February 1951 in Dulwich, the eldest of four daughters. Her parents were teachers, and the family moved to Edinburgh for her father's work in 1962. She was educated at George Watson's College in Edinburgh from 1962 to 1968, and then read Chinese and Social and Political Sciences and then Social Research Methods at Newnham College Cambridge University. Marsh worked at the SSRC Survey Unit in the mid-1970s, was a lecturer at Cambridge University, and worked at the University of Manchester, where she was appointed Professor of Quantitative Methods in 1992.

Marsh authored two books: The Survey Method, which advocated for the inclusion of surveys in sociology, and Exploring Data, which aimed to explain statistics to social science students in an enjoyable manner. Exploring Data was updated by Jane Elliott in 2008. Marsh was chair of the Social Statistics Section of the Royal Statistical Society from 1990 to 1992.

Marsh died of breast cancer in 1993, aged 41. She was married with two sons.

The Cathie Marsh Institute for Social Research (CMIST) at the University of Manchester was named after her. The computing room in her former faculty at the University of Cambridge's Faculty of Human, Social, and Political Science was renamed the Cathie Marsh Machine Room after her death. The Social Research Association awards the Cathie Marsh Memorial Lecture each year.
