= Sarah Childs =

British Professor

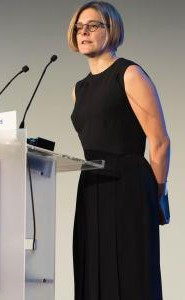
- Born: 1969 (age 56–57)
- Occupation: Professor
- Known for: Writing and research on gender and politics

Professor Sarah Childs (born 1969) is a British Professor who has worked at Bristol University, Birkbeck, Royal Holloway and the University of Edinburgh where she holds their Personal Chair of Politics and Gender.

== Life ==
Childs was born in 1969 and began lecturing at the University of Bristol in 2009. In 2014 she published research with Rosie Campbell which indicated that women conservatives were not as right wing as male conservatives on issues that related to economics.

In 2014 she moved to Birkbeck College and then Royal Holloway which are both parts of the University of London. In 2020 she started work at the University of Edinburgh.

In 2006 Childs and Mona Lena Krook published the book they had edited Women, Gender, and Politics: A Reader.

In 2015 she was seconded to work in the UK Parliament and as a result "The Good Parliament (TGP) Report" was published. Its recommendations that included maternity leave were gradually adopted.

In 2021 the Centenary Action Group published her report Remotely Representative House which she had written with Jessica C. Smith. The report looked at the good things that had happened due to the COVID-19 pandemic as it had caused remote working at the Houses of Parliament and there were benefits for parents and constituents when MPs worked remotely.

== Selected works ==
- "Rethinking Women's Substantive Representation" (co-authored with Karen Celis, Mona Lena Krook, and Johanna Kantola), Representation (2008)
- Women, Gender, and Politics: A Reader, 2010
- The Good Parliament (TGP) Report, 2016
- Feminist Democratic Representation, (written with Karen Celis), 2020

== Awards ==
In 2015, the Political Studies Association (PSA) gave Childs a national award for sustained and significant contribution to the study of politics and gender. In 2022 her book Feminist Democratic Representation jointly won the PSA W.J.M. MacKenzie book prize.
