= Rita Gardner (geographer) =

British geographer and academic

Rita Ann Moden Gardner, CBE, FRGS, FRSGS, FAcSS (born 10 November 1955) is a British geographer and academic, specialising in geomorphology. Since January 2019, she has been Chief Executive of the Academy of Social Sciences. She taught at St Catherine's College, Oxford (1978–1979), King's College, London (1979–1994), and finally at Queen Mary and Westfield College (1994–1996) where she was Reader in Environmental Science. From 1996 to 2018, she was Director of the Royal Geographical Society: she was the learned society's first female director.

== Honours ==
She was awarded the Busk Medal by the Royal Geographical Society in 1995.

In the 2003 New Year Honours, Gardner was appointed Commander of the Order of the British Empire (CBE) "for services to geography". She is a Fellow of the Royal Geographical Society (FRGS), and a Fellow of the Academy of Social Sciences (FAcSS).

In 2016, she was awarded the Scottish Geographical Medal, the highest honour of the Royal Scottish Geographical Society, in recognition "of her outstandingly successful work in promoting Geography – in academic research, in schools, and in public life". She was also made an Honorary Fellow of the Royal Scottish Geographical Society (FRSGS) in 2016.

== Selected works ==
- Gardner, Rita; Scoging, Helen, eds. (1983). Mega-geomorphology: twelve of the papers presented at a conference of the British geomorphological research Group; London, 26-30 March 1981. Oxford: Clarendon Press. ISBN 978-0198232445.
- Goudie, Andrew; Gardner, Rita (1985). Discovering landscape in England & Wales (1st ed.). London: Allen & Unwin. ISBN 978-0045510764.
- Goudie, Andrew; Gardner, Rita (1992). Discovering landscape in England & Wales (2nd ed.). London: Chapman & Hall. ISBN 978-0412478505.
