= Mona Lena Krook =

American political scientist

- Education: Columbia University
- Scientific career
- Fields: Political science; Gender studies
- Workplaces: University of Bristol; Washington University in St. Louis; Rutgers University
- Doctoral advisor: Mark Kesselman

Mona Lena Krook is an American political scientist. She is a Professor of Political Science at Rutgers University, where she is also the Chair of the Women and Politics Ph.D. Program. She studies the political representation of women, particularly gender quotas in governments and the phenomenon of violence against women in politics.

== Education and early work ==
Krook attended Columbia College, where she obtained a BA in political science in 1997. From 1997 to 1998, she was a Fulbright Fellow at the University of Helsinki. Krook then returned to Columbia, where she earned an MPhil in 1999, and a Certificate in Western European Studies and one in Feminist Scholarship in 2001. She graduated from Columbia Graduate School of Arts and Sciences with a PhD in 2005, with a dissertation entitled Politicizing Representation: Campaigns for Candidate Gender Quotas Worldwide. While she was a student, Krook had temporary affiliations with the Autonomous University of Madrid, the University of Oslo, and the Stockholm University.

In 2004, Krook was a Postdoctoral Research Fellow for one year at the University of Bristol, after which she joined the faculty of Arts and Sciences at Washington University in St. Louis in the Department of Political Science and the Department of Women, Gender, and Sexuality Studies From 2008 to 2009, she was a fellow at Harvard University. In 2012, she moved to Rutgers University.

== Career ==
In 2009, Krook published the book Quotas for Women in Politics: Gender and Candidate Selection Reform Worldwide, which studied why the adoption of gender quotas for women in government in more than 100 countries had not resulted in a universal increase in the representation of women. Krook studies three types of quotas: reserved seats, party quotas, and legislative quotas, each of which is a different method for attempting to ensure fairer representation of women in government. She studies the rationales for and effects of these types by matching pairs of countries: she pairs Pakistan and India, Sweden and the United Kingdom, and Argentina and France. By pairing countries which have similar quota types but different outcomes, Krook illustrates that the quota type is not the main determinant of how representation changes; rather, each type of quota can be more or less effective in improving representation. Quotas for Women in Politics was one of the first attempts to study gender quotes in an explicitly comparative framework, rather than focusing on one case at a time.

For Quotas for Women in Politics, Krook won the 2010 Victoria Schuck Award from the American Political Science Association, which honors the best book published on the topic of women and politics each year. 9 years later, the book won the George H. Hallett Award from the Representation and Electoral Systems Section of the American Political Science Association, which recognizes a book that was published at least 10 years previously that made a lasting contribution to the study of representation and electoral systems.

Krook has also written a second book, the 2020 volume Violence Against Women in Politics, exploring rising attacks against women in public life around the globe. She theorizes violence against women in politics as a distinct form of violence aimed at preventing and undermining women's political participation, taking physical, psychological, sexual, economic, and semiotic forms. Violence against Women in Politics won the 2022 Grawemeyer Award for Ideas Improving World Order, given to “those who have taken on issues of world importance and presented viewpoints that could lead to a more just and peaceful world.” Since 2015, Krook has collaborated with the National Democratic Institute (NDI) on its #NotTheCost campaign to stop violence against women in politics and, in 2021, was recognized for her work with NDI and other global practitioners with the American Political Science Association’s Distinguished Award for Civic and Community Engagement, honoring significant civic or community engagement activity by a political scientist.

In addition to these publications, Krook has edited or co-edited 6 books, as well as published numerous articles in peer-reviewed journals. Several of those papers have also won awards, including the 2016 Wilma Rule Award for Best Research on Gender and Politics from the International Political Science Association for the paper "Violence Against Women in Politics: A Rising Threat to Democracy Worldwide", and the Best Paper Award from the Women and Politics Research Section of the American Political Science Association for her paper "Mapping Violence against Women in Politics: Aggression, Harassment, and Discrimination against Female Politicians", which Krook co-authored with Juliana Restrepo Sanin.

Krook's work has been cited, or she has been quoted, in outlets like The New York Times, The Hill, The Economist, Wired, and The Washington Post. From 2015 to 2020, she was a Chancellor's Scholar at Rutgers University. Between 2017 and 2019, she was an Andrew Carnegie Fellow.

== Selected works ==
- "Reforming Representation: The Diffusion of Candidate Gender Quotas Worldwide", Politics & Gender (2006)
- "Rethinking Women's Substantive Representation" (co-authored with Karen Celis, Sarah Childs, and Johanna Kantola), Representation (2008)
- "Rethinking the Life Cycles of International Norms: The United Nations and the Global Promotion of Gender Equality" (co-authored with Jacqui True), European Journal of International Relations (2012)
- Quotas for Women in Politics: Gender and Candidate Selection Reform Worldwide (2009)
- Violence Against Women in Politics (2020) She dedicated this book to her two kids, Lars and Soren.
- Gender, Politics, and Institutions: Towards a Feminist Institutionalism (co-edited with Fiona Mackay) (2011)
- The Impact of Gender Quotas (co-edited with Susan Franceschet and Jennifer M. Piscopo) (2012)

== Selected awards ==
- Grawemeyer Award for Ideas Improving World Order for Violence against Women in Politics, 2022.
- Distinguished Award for Civic and Community Engagement, American Political Science Association, 2021.
- Apolitical’s 100 Most Influential People in Gender Policy List, 2021.
- George H. Hallett Award for Quotas for Women in Politics: Gender and Candidate Selection Reform Worldwide, Representation and Electoral Systems Section, American Political Science Association, 2019.
- Wilma Rule Award, International Political Science Association, 2016.
- Best Paper Award, American Political Science Association Women and Politics, 2015
- Victoria Schuck Award for Quotas for Women in Politics: Gender and Candidate Selection Reform Worldwide, American Political Science Association, 2010.
