= Jane Falkingham =

British demographer

Jane Cecelia Falkingham CBE (born 6 September 1963) is a Professor of Demography and International Social Policy at the University of Southampton. She is also Vice-President (Engagement and International) at the University of Southampton, and Director of the ESRC Centre for Population Change and Principal Investigator of ESRC Connecting Generations. She is Chair of Population Europe. She was President of the European Association of Population Studies (EAPS) between 2018 and 2020, and was President of the British Society for Population Studies between 2015 and 2017.

Between 2017 and 2022, she was a part of the UK Research and Innovation (UKRI) Executive Committee as a member of the Economic and Social Research Council. She was Chair of the ESRC Covid-19 Rapid Response funding panel and a member of the ADRUK Steering Board. She is Fellow of the British Academy, Academy of Social Sciences and the Royal Society of Arts.

She spent the first 21 years of her academic career at the London School of Economics and Political Science (LSE), starting as an undergraduate. She became Bachelor of Science (BSc) in Economics (International Trade and Development) in 1984, and Master of Science (MSc) in Demography in 1985. From 1986 to 2002 she held various academic research positions at LSE, including Lecturer, and then became a Reader in the Department of Social Policy. She joined the University of Southampton in 2002 as a Professor, becoming Head of the School of Social Sciences in 2010 and Dean of the Faculty of Social Science in 2014

Falkingham was appointed Officer of the Order of the British Empire (OBE) in the 2015 Birthday Honours for services to social science and Commander of the Order of the British Empire (CBE) in the 2023 New Year Honours for services to demographic research.
