= Helen Loney =

Archaeologist

- Born: San Francisco Bay Area

Academic background
- Education: University of California, Santa Barbara; University of Pennsylvania
- Thesis: The Development of Apennine Ceramic Manufacture: Xeroradiographic Analysis (1995)

Academic work
- Discipline: Archaeology
- Sub-discipline: Prehistoric archaeology; Mortuary archaeology
- Institutions: University of Glasgow; University of Worcester; Worcestershire Archaeological Society; Society for Post-Medieval Archaeology

Helen Loney is an archaeologist specialising in the study of prehistory. She has worked as a lecturer and tutor at the University of Glasgow (1996–2007), the University of Worcester (2007–2022), and the University of Oxford. Loney has a number of roles with archaeology societies, working on the council of the Society for Post-Medieval Archaeology and taking on editorial roles with the journal Post-Medieval Archaeology and the Transactions of the Cumberland and Westmorland Antiquarian and Archaeological Society.

== Early life and education ==
Loney was born in the San Francisco Bay Area. She studied a Bachelor of Arts in anthropology at the University of California, Santa Barbara, graduating magna cum laude in 1983. She went on to complete a Master of Arts and a Doctor of Philosophy at the University of Pennsylvania, finishing in 1995 with a doctoral thesis titled The Development of Apennine Ceramic Manufacture: Xeroradiographic Analysis. Loney later emigrated to the UK.

== Career ==
Loney worked as a lecturer in archaeology at the University of Glasgow between 1996 and 2007, before moving to the University of Worcester for the start of the 2007/08 academic year as Principal Lecturer. In 2008/09, Loney and Andrew Hoaen received funding to radiocarbon-date material recovered during fieldwork at Matterdale. In 2013 wrote the book Social Change and Technology in Prehistoric Italy, based on her PhD thesis. It was published by the Accordia Research Institute, and a review by Bob Chapman for the Prehistoric Society described it as a "welcome [addition] to the literature on later Italian prehistory". She is a course tutor in archaeology at Oxford University Department of Continuing Education, and Honorary Senior Research Fellow with the University of Worcester.

In 2022 she was appointed Chair of the Worcestershire Archaeological Society and council member of the Society for Post-Medieval Archaeology. The following year Loney took on the role of editor of Post-Medieval Archaeology, working initially with Cait Scott and then Lara Band, before working as sole editor from 2024. She has also served as a member of the editorial board for the Cumberland and Westmorland Antiquarian and Archaeological Society.

== Selected publications ==
=== Books ===
- Loney, Helen L. (2013). Social Change and Technology in Prehistoric Italy. Accordia Specialist Studies on Italy. Vol. 16. Accordia Research Institute. ISBN 978-1-873415-39-9.

=== Articles and chapters ===
- Loney, Helen L. (2000). "Society and Technological Control: A Critical Review of Models of Technological Change in Ceramic Studies". American Antiquity. 65 (4): 646–668. doi:10.2307/2694420. JSTOR 2694420.
- Loney, Helen L. (2003). "Themes and Models in the Development of Italian Prehistory". Journal of Mediterranean Archaeology. 15 (2): 199–215. doi:10.1558/jmea.v15i2.199.
- Loney, Helen L.; Hoaen, Andrew W. (2005). "Landscape, Memory and Material Culture: Interpreting Diversity in the Iron Age". Proceedings of the Prehistoric Society. 71: 361–378. doi:10.1017/S0079497X00001067.
- Hoaen, Andrew W; Loney, Helen L. (2005). "Bronze and Iron Age connections: memory and persistence in Matterdale, Cumbria". Transactions of the Cumberland & Westmorland Antiquarian & Archaeological Society. 4: 39–54. doi:10.5284/1064645.
- Loney, Helen L. (2007). "Prehistoric Italian Pottery Production: Motor Memory, Motor Development and Technological Transfer". Journal of Mediterranean Archaeology. 20 (2): 183–207. doi:10.1558/jmea.v20i2.183.
- Hoaen, Andrew W.; Loney, Helen L. (2007). "Cairnfields: understanding economic and ecological practice during the Bronze Age of Central Britain". In Cherry, P. J. (ed.). Studies in Northern Prehistory: Essays in Memory of Clare Fell. Cumberland and Westmorland Antiquarian and Archaeological Society. pp. 189–210. ISBN 9781873124444.
- Hoaen, Andrew W.; Loney, Helen L. (2013). "Excavations of Iron Age and Roman Iron Age levels at a settlement in Glencoyne Park, Ullswater, Cumbria". Transactions of the Cumberland & Westmorland Antiquarian & Archaeological Society. 10: 93–102. doi:10.5284/1064109.
- Loney, Helen L.; Hoaen, Andrew W.; Ruffle, Bob (2020). "History and archaeology of the St Wulstan's Hospital site, Malvern Wells". Transactions of the Worcestershire Archaeological Society. 27: 133–143.
- Loney, Helen L.; Hoaen, Andrew (2023). "Porcelain waste and porcelain production in Worcester: the landscape evidence from fieldwalking". Post-Medieval Archaeology. 57 (2): 268–290. doi:10.1080/00794236.2023.2252136.
