= Health Survey for England =

The Health Survey for England (HSE) is a statistical survey which is conducted annually in order to collect information concerning health and health-related behaviour of people living in private households in England.

== History ==
The HSE was set up in 1991 to provide information about life-style and behaviour choices with the aim of improving the targeting of national health policies. From 1991 to 1994, the survey was conducted by the Office of Population Censuses and Surveys which is now part of the Office for National Statistics (ONS). This changed in 1994 and the survey is now conducted by the Joint Survey Unit of the National Centre for Social Research (NatCen) and the Department of Epidemiology and Public Health at University College London.[1]

The HSE consists of core questions that remain relatively unchanged except for updating for policy changes, e.g. the addition of questions on e-cigarettes. These core questions are included on a regular basis, e.g. every year, every two years, every 3 years depending upon demand. In addition, over the years, the HSE has included additional modules of questions at various intervals to allow the monitoring of change. Some of these modules of questions have been funded by other organisations such as government departments and charities. These additional modules are repeated in appropriate intervals to assure continuity and to monitor change. Data is collected through an interview survey and a nurse visit. The interview survey takes approximately 60 minutes and includes height and weight measurement if the participant consents. The nurse visit is used to collect data on medications and to collect further health examination data, such as urine, saliva or blood samples, blood pressure measurements or other measures, depending on the focus topics of that year.

Since 1991, the following topics have been in the focus of the HSE:

• 1993 Cardiovascular disease

• 1994 Cardiovascular disease

• 1995 Asthma, accidents and disability

• 1996 Asthma, accidents and special measures of general health

• 1997 Children and young people

• 1998 Cardiovascular disease

• 1999 Ethnic groups

• 2000 Older people and social exclusion

• 2001 Respiratory disease and atopic conditions, disability and non-fatal accidents

• 2002 Children and young people (aged 0–24)

• 2003 Cardiovascular disease

• 2004 Ethnic minority groups

• 2005 Older people

• 2006 Cardiovascular disease[2]

• 2007 CVD and risk factors for adults, obesity and risk factors for children

• 2008 Physical activity and fitness

• 2009 Health and lifestyles, kidney disease

• 2010 Respiratory health, kidney disease, sexual health, wellbeing

• 2011 Health, social care and lifestyles, wellbeing

• 2012 Physical activity and fitness

• 2013 Social care

• 2014 Social care, hearing, mental health, planning for social care

• 2015 Social care, physical activity and fitness (children)

• 2016 Social care, liver disease, physical activity and fitness (adults), kidney disease

• 2017 Cardiovascular disease and Gambling

• 2018 Gambling and Respiratory health

• 2019 Eating disorders dental health every mind matters and Careers

From 1991 to 1995 the HSE was restricted to adults aged 16 and over but that changed in 1995 when children aged 2–15 were equally included in the survey. Since 2001, the age restrictions were removed completely except for topics only targeting a certain population group.[3]

== Methodology and scope ==
The survey is used to estimate the proportion of people in England who have health conditions, and the prevalence of risk factors and behaviours associated with certain health conditions. The surveys provide regular information that cannot be obtained from other sources. This data is used to highlight issues amenable to policy-making, to support policy decision making, and to monitor and evaluate health policies [6, 7].

For some statistics such as height, weight, overweight and obesity, smoking, general health, longstanding illness and acute sickness data from the 1990s onwards are published in trend tables. Other trend tables, e.g. hypertension cover the period 2003-2019.

There are many questions and topics covered by the series of surveys and some questions are not reported in the publications each year.

== Survey results ==
The main findings of the HSE are published annually in the form of a report by NHS Digital

== Re-using the data ==
On completion of each annual survey an anonymised dataset is created for secondary research. Applications for access are accepted from members of central and local government, higher/further education and charities, for not for profit teaching and research. The data and additional study information is available to download at the http://ukdataservice.ac.uk/.
