= UK Academy for Information Systems =

The UK Academy for Information Systems
- Founded: 1994
- Type: Learned society
- Registration no.: 1070511
- Purpose: Information systems
- Location: United Kingdom
- Method: Conferences, Publications and Teaching
- President: Oliver Kayas
- Website: www.ukais.org

The UK Academy for Information Systems (UKAIS) is an active combination of a traditional learned society, communications channel and pressure group. It is a conduit for communication between industry and academia to ensure that relevant courses can be designed and research initiatives established throughout the UK. The UKAIS has attempted to create a 'uniform' definition of Information Systems: the means by which people and organisations, utilising technologies, gather, process, store, use and disseminate information.

By aiming to continually improve the quality and relevance of teaching through innovative and rigorous research the society contributes to both academic development and excellence in IS practice throughout the UK. Part of their role has been to establish links between commercial, government and academic organisations. Teaching, research and practice in the field are supported by UKAIS through its annual conference, PhD consortia, workshops, online events, research grants, teaching and learning awards, and membership benefits (e.g. supporting early career researchers through its mentoring scheme).

The UK Academy for Information Systems is a signatory of the San Francisco Declaration on Research Assessment (DORA).

== History ==
The society arose from a meeting in 1993 of leading UK academics in information systems. Concerns were expressed at the meeting about the way IS teaching and research were funded which stemmed from a lack of recognition of IS as a growing and important academic discipline. The UKAIS was established in 1994 to remedy this situation as a charity, whose aims are to provide a better knowledge of IS within the UK and to provide a forum for discussing issues in IS teaching and research. It also aims to be influential in obtaining better understanding of the uniqueness of the subject by HEFCE, the UK Research Councils, professional bodies, UK business and Government. They have successfully achieved recognition that IS is not being dealt with sufficiently by such bodies and have suggested ways of improving the situation.

Beyond this the work of the society is within the domain involving the study of theories and practices related to the social and technological phenomena, which determine the development, use and effects of information systems in organisations and society.

1. Theoretical underpinnings of information systems
2. Data, information and knowledge management
3. Information in organisational decision making
4. Integration of information systems with organisational strategy and development
5. Information systems design
6. Development, implementation and maintenance of information systems
7. Information and communication technologies (ICT)
8. Management of information systems and services
9. Organisational and social effects of ICT-based information systems
10. Economic effects of ICT-based information systems

== UKAIS Presidents ==
UKAIS Presidents
| Year | Name | Affiliation |
|---|---|---|
| 1995/96 | John Ward | Cranfield |
| 1997/98 | David Avison | University of Southampton |
| 1999/00 | Frank Stowell | De Montfort |
| 2001/02 | John Ward | Cranfield |
| 2003/04 | Philip Powell | Birkbeck |
| 2005/06 | Steve Smithson | LSE |
| 2007/08 | Laurence Brooks | Brunel University London |
| 2009/10 | David Wainwright | Northumbria University |
| 2011/12 | Guy Fitzgerald | Brunel University London |
| 2012/13 | Ray Paul | Brunel University London |
| 2014/15 | Dave Wastell | Nottingham University |
| 2016/17 | Rachel McLean | Liverpool John Moores University |
| 2018/19 | Marie Griffiths | Salford University |
| 2020/22 | Savvas Papagiannidis | Newcastle University |
| 2022/24 | Niki Panteli | Royal Holloway University of London |
| 2024-present | Oliver Kayas | Liverpool John Moores University |

== UKAIS Annual Conference ==
The UKAIS Annual Conference is one of the key academic events in the Information Systems calendar within the UK, and attracts leading scholars from the UK and overseas.
