= British Accounting & Finance Association =

Learned society and research organisation

- Established: 1949
- Focus: A UK learned society bringing together those interested in teaching and research in accounting and finance
- President: Stewart Smyth
- Members: 850+
- Formerly called: Association of University Teachers of Accounting, British Accounting Association
- Location: UK
- Website: bafa.ac.uk

The British Accounting and Finance Association (BAFA) is a learned society and research organisation dedicated to the advancement of knowledge and understanding of accounting, finance and financial management. It has over 750 members and edits the British Accounting Review, an academic journal.

The association is a UK registered charity no. 299527.

== Overview ==
BAFA promotes the development of innovative approaches to research and teaching in accounting and finance, and celebrates the breadth and diversity of research by UK and international researchers.

It collaborates with other organisations, such as the Academy of Social Sciences, the British Academy, and professional accounting bodies, to promote accounting and finance as a social science that influences professional practice and affects the economy and society.

In addition to publishing the scholarly journal, the British Accounting Review, BAFA hosts an annual conference in April that attracts academics and professionals from around the world.

== History ==
The Association of University Teachers of Accounting (AUTA) was formed in 1947 with Donald Cousins as its first Chairman. It held its inaugural meeting in December of that year at a time when the UK’s first accounting professorships were being created and accountancy was becoming recognised as a subject for scholarly study. The AUTA followed in the footsteps of the Accounting Research Organisation, which had been established in 1936, although it had ceased activities by 1941. Harold Edey had an important role in the early years, in particular ensuring that the academic study of accounting was given value by the profession.

As a result of the small number of both researchers and teachers in accounting during the 1960s – Parker (1997, p. 45) lists a mere 21 in the whole country – and because of a distinct lack of engagement at the time from the profession, the organisation almost disappeared. However, it was given a new lease of life later in that decade when the AUTA News Review was set up (although a Newsletter had existed on a more ad hoc basis since its first issue in 1948 with Will Baxter its Editor). This publication was renamed the AUTA Review in 1974 and it then became the British Accounting Review in 1984.

Around the same time, a set of regional associations were also established, which allowed universities outside London to establish their own research foci in the accounting area. The Scottish Accountants Group ran their initial conference in April 1967 while the Northern Accountants Group also first met in that month with its first conference organised by Robert Parker taking place in October of the same year. By the end of the next decade, South-eastern and South-western groups had also been formed.

Two of BAFA’s other sub-committees, the Conference of Professors of Accounting and Finance (CPAF) and the Committee of Departments of Accounting and Finance (CDAF) were both established in 1987 as the Conference of Professors of Accounting and the Committee of Heads of Accounting in Polytechnics respectively, although the latter was initially organised as a separate entity to the AUTA.

The tradition of holding a broad-based conference in April with location moving around the United Kingdom began in 1949 in Birmingham. The organisation stopped holding conferences from 1959 to 1970 but these began again in 1971 with 62 attendees, and have been held annually since then with participant numbers growing to over 300. The conference has included a Doctoral Colloquium since 1990.

The AUTA became the British Accounting Association (BAA) in 1984 and the most recent chapter in the history of the organisation began in April 2012 when the BAA changed its name to the British Accounting and Finance Association (BAFA) to better match its wider remit spanning finance and financial management as well as accounting.

== Membership ==
BAFA has over 750 members, comprising academics, students and accounting professionals. There are two levels of membership: ordinary and honorary.

Ordinary membership is by application and is open to anyone with an interest in research in accounting and finance.

Honorary membership is conferred by the executive committee, in recognition of services to accounting, finance and/or financial management education and research which are deemed worthy of recognition by the association.

BAFA is not a qualifying body for the purposes of practising accounting and finance.

== The British Accounting Review ==
The British Accounting Review is the official journal of the British Accounting and Finance Association. It publishes original scholarly papers covering the whole spectrum of accounting and finance.

The journal allows original research to reach academics, students, professional bodies and their members, accounting and auditing standards bodies, financial regulators and government departments.

Research contributions must demonstrate the use of rigorous and appropriate research methodologies, and use high quality data for empirical studies.

All papers published are subject to a minimum of double blind review.

The joint editors are currently Professors Nathan Joseph and Alan Lowe.

== Groups ==
=== BAFA Sub-committees ===
There are two BAFA sub-committees:

- Committee for Departments of Accounting and Finance (CDAF)

CDAF is concerned with matters of national importance in the management of University departments of Accounting and Finance, focusing upon issues of curriculum, quality assurance, academic management, professional body links and staff development.

- Conference of Professors of Accounting and Finance (CPAF)

CPAF provides a forum for the discussion of strategic matters of relevance to academics in accounting and finance. Most members are professors, but exceptionally they may be the most senior academic in an HEI without any Professors in Accounting or Finance. CPAF holds an annual conference in September.

=== Regional Groups ===
- Northern Area Group
- Scottish Group
- South East Area Group
- South West Area Group

Each group hosts its own local events.

=== Special Interest Groups ===
BAFA runs a number of groups that address specific subject areas. They are:

- Accounting and Finance in Emerging Economies Special Interest Group
- Accounting Education Special Interest Group
- Auditing Special Interest Group (ASIG)
- Corporate Governance Special Interest Group
- Financial Accounting and Reporting Special Interest Group
- Financial Markets and Institutions Special Interest Group
- Interdisciplinary Perspectives Special Interest Group
- Public Services and Charities Special Interest Group
- Corporate Finance and Asset Pricing Special Interest Group

== BAFA Awards ==
BAFA makes three awards annually: the Distinguished Academic Award (DAA), the Lifetime Achievement Award (LAA), and the Distinguished Contribution Award (DCA).

The DAA is presented to an individual who has made a substantial and direct contribution to UK academic accounting and finance life, while the LAA is awarded to one or more individuals who have made a substantial and direct contributions to UK academic accounting and finance over the course of their careers.

The DCA was launched in 2016 to recognise non-academics who have made a significant contribution to the profession and to BAFA.
