= UK Evaluation Society =

Learned and professional society in the United Kingdom

The UK Evaluation Society (UKES) was founded in 1994 and is the principal professional organisation for evaluation of social policy and programmes in the UK. It is a member of the UK Academy of Social Sciences. Its president is Dr Kirstine Szifris (December 2023 until November 2026) and Executive Director is Nick Posford. UKES was registered as a charity on 27 November 2024.

== Activities ==
- Developed a Manifesto for Evaluation, coinciding with the 2024 United Kingdom general election.
- Organises an annual conference, which in 2023 was sponsored by RSM UK and Kantar Public (now Verian). In 2023, keynote speakers were Emily Gates (Boston College), Kelly Beaver MBE (Ipsos), Urvashi Parashar (Department for Culture, Media and Sport), and Nigel Ball (Social Purpose Lab) at University of the Arts London).
- Develops guidance for conducting evaluations, for example Guidelines for Good Practice in Evaluation (revised 2018) and Quality of Evidence Rubrics for Single Cases (2023).
- Offers training course on evaluation, which are recommended by the UK government for civil servants.
- Provides peer review for the UK government Magenta Book, the HM Treasury guidance on key considerations when conducting evaluations of public policies and programmes, which was last updated 2020. Also acts as a specialist network, which government draws on when developing evaluation approaches.
- Publishes a journal, Evaluative Practice.
- Offers prizes, in 2023 for Data Analytics in Evaluation; impact and efforts of Early Career Evaluators; and novel and Innovative Methods. The prizes were sponsored by RSM UK and Ipsos UK.

== Membership ==
The most recent membership figures (up to June 2022) are presented in the table below.

UKES membership figures
	26 May 2020	26 May 2021	22 June 2022
Individual members	117	183	206
Student members	1	14	13
Institutional members (org)	22	33	40
Total number of members	247	642	930
