= ScotCen Social Research =

- Type: Not-for-profit organization
- Headquarters: Edinburgh, Scotland
- Location: Scotland, United Kingdom
- Fields: Social research, public opinion analysis
- Parent organization: NatCen Social Research

ScotCen Social Research is the Scottish branch of the United Kingdom’s largest centre for independent social research, NatCen Social Research.

Based in Edinburgh, ScotCen Social Research is a not-for-profit organisation. Employees include survey methodologists, data analysts and expert quantitative and qualitative researchers. It is commissioned by governments and charities to investigate public opinion about social issues.

The Centre is known for conducting fieldwork and reporting on studies including the annual Scottish Health Survey, the Scottish Social Attitudes survey, and the Growing Up in Scotland longitudinal study.

The research conducted covers:

- Children and young people
- Communities
- Families
- Crime and justice
- Equality and diversity
- Health and wellbeing
- Housing
- Income and work
- Schools, education and training
- Social and political attitudes
- Transport
