= Rosie Campbell =

British political scientist and academic (born 1976)

Rosie Campbell (born September 1976) is professor of politics at King's College, University of London, and the director of the Global Institute for Women’s Leadership until 2025. Previously she was a professor at UCL and Birkbeck College. She is a specialist in public expectations of politicians and voting behaviour. In 2018, she was elected a Fellow of the Academy of Social Sciences.

== Life ==
Rosie Campbell was born in September 1976, and is professor of politics at King's College, University of London. She is a specialist in public expectations of politicians and voting behaviour. She was a professor at UCL and Birkbeck College. In 2018 she moved from Birkbeck to King's College London, where she is professor of politics and until 2025 was the director of the Global Institute for Women’s Leadership.

In 2014 she published research with Sarah Childs which indicated that women conservatives were not as right wing as male conservatives on issues that related to economics.

In 2018, she was elected a Fellow of the Academy of Social Sciences.

== Broadcasts ==
- "Tearing Up the Politics Textbook". BBC. 2016.
- "How Voters Decide: Part Two". BBC. 2017.
- "Authenticity". BBC. 2017.
