= British Accounting Review =

- Discipline: Accounting & Finance
- Language: English
- Edited by: Wenxuan Hou, Jason Xiao

Publication details
- Publisher: Elsevier
- Frequency: Bimonthly
- Impact factor: 5.5 (2023)

Standard abbreviations
- ISO 4: Br. Account. Rev.

Indexing
- ISSN: 0890-8389
- OCLC no.: 877647806

Links
- Journal homepage

The British Accounting Review is an academic journal of the British Accounting and Finance Association that was established in 1969. Serving its purpose to educate and connect users, the British Accounting Review helps uphold the mission of the British Accounting and Finance Association.

Even though the journal was founded in the UK, the academic journal accepts UK and non-UK sourced research, reflecting the multinational users of the academic journal. Besides the British Accounting and Finance Association, creditable accounting agencies, like the American Accounting Association, use the British Accounting Review. The journal is freely accessible and can include anything relating to the widespread areas of accounting or finance, such as financial & management accounting, auditing, finance and financial management, taxation, AIS, Fintech, green finance, public sector accounting, sustainability reporting, and accounting history. Some of the most cited articles from the academic journal discuss balance scorecard trends and ESG disclosures. Multiple research methodologies are accepted, from analytical to survey.

Before articles are published in the journal they must go through an editorial process that includes a double blind review to check for quality and integrity. Its current editors-in-chief are Wenxuan Hou (University of Edinburgh) and Jason Zezhong Xiao (University of Macau) and its immediate past editors were Nathan L. Joseph and Alan Lowe (Aston Business School).
