= Campaign for Social Science =

The Campaign for Social Science was launched in 2011 to advocate social science to the UK Government and to the public, at a time of significant change in the higher education system. It campaigns for the restoration of the post of Government Chief Social Science Advisor, promotes social science in the media and on the web, and organises roadshows and other events to emphasise the value of social science.

== History ==
The Campaign was established by the Academy of Social Sciences and was formally launched at the House of Lords in January 2011, at an event that featured speakers including Trevor Phillips, Chair of the Equality and Human Rights Commission, Polly Toynbee, the Guardian columnist, and David Willetts, the then Universities and Science Minister in the Coalition Government.

== Structure and funding ==
The Campaign's Board is chaired by James Wilsdon, Professor of Research Policy, Department of Politics, Director of Impact and Engagement, Faculty of Social Sciences at the University of Sheffield and founding director of the Science Policy Centre at the Royal Society. Other members are: Stephen Anderson, executive director of the Academy of Social Sciences; Nick Bibby, Communications Officer at the Centre on Constitutional Change, University of Edinburgh; Dr Jacqui Briggs, FAcSS, Head of School of Social and Political Sciences, University of Lincoln; Rachel Neaman, CEO, Corsham Institute; Professor Colin Copus FAcSS, Professor of Local Politics and Director of the Local Governance Research Unit, De Montfort University; Professor Rick Delbridge FAcSS, Dean of Research, Innovation & Enterprise, Cardiff University, and Professor of Organizational Analysis, Cardiff Business School; Barbara Doig, FAcSS, former Scottish Executive Chief Researcher; Dr Claire Donovan, Reader in the Health Economics Research Group, Brunel University London; Professor Patrick Dunleavy FAcSS, Professor of Political Science and Public Policy Chair, London School of Economics and Political Science; Professor Jon Glasby FAcSS, Professor of Health and Social Care and Head of School of Social Policy, University of Birmingham; John Goddard OBE FAcSS, Emeritus Professor of Regional Development Studies at Newcastle University; Desiree Lopez, CEO of TNS BMRB; Ziyad Marar, Executive Vice President and Global Publishing Director at SAGE; Professor Andrew Russell, Professor of Politics, University of Manchester; Dr Olivia Stevenson, Public Policy Impact Facilitator with the Office of the Vice-Provost (Research), University College London; Professor Neil Ward FAcSS, Pro Vice Chancellor of the University of East Anglia; Sharon Witherspoon MBE FAcSS, former Director of the Nuffield Foundation and Acting Head of Policy at the Academy of Social Sciences and its Campaign for Social Science; Dr Milly Zimeta, freelance journalist, writer and lecturer at the University of Roehampton.

The Campaign receives no state funding, and relies on donations and sponsorship; among its sponsors are 50 universities, 23 learned societies, six publishers and two charities.

== Lobbying ==
The Campaign has urged the restoration of the post of Government Chief Social Science Advisor, which was removed in 2010 when the role was downgraded and split between two people who also have other responsibilities. The Campaign made its case to the House of Lords Science Select Committee on Science and Technology, which issued a report in February 2012 calling for the post to be reinstated.

== Events ==
As of December 2013, the Campaign had held 19 roadshows at universities around the UK to emphasise the value and importance of social science and to encourage support and donations.

With the Academy of Social Sciences, the Campaign organised a conference on the 2011 England riots at Gresham College, London, in October 2011, and a public discussion on the future of universities, at the University of East London in October 2011. The Campaign held a launch for the latest booklet in its Making the Case for the Social Sciences, in November 2013, on mental wellbeing; speakers including Professor Lord Richard Layard and Andy Burnham, Shadow Secretary of State for Health.

== Publicity ==
The Campaign promotes social science in the media, with letters and articles published in the Times Higher Education magazine and The Guardian newspaper on issues such as the Chief Social Science Advisor and the need for closer relations between social scientists and government. In October 2013 the Campaign released a report saying that social science graduates had a higher employment rate 3.5 years after the end of their degrees than did science or arts-humanities graduates. In February 2015 it released The Business of People, a report into social science and society.
