= Kaye Thorn =

Management academic at Massey University in New Zealand

Academic background
- Education: Massey University, University of Canterbury
- Theses: Public participation in resource allocation (1984); Flight of the kiwi: an exploration of motives and behaviours of self-initiated mobility (2008)
- Doctoral advisor: Keith Alexander Macky, Stuart Carr, Ralph James Bathurst, Kerr Inkson
- Other advisor: C. Nicholas Taylor

Academic work
- Institutions: Massey University

Kaye Jennifer Thorn is a New Zealand management and human resources academic, and is a full professor at Massey University. Thorn specialises in career progression, studying issues such as mobility, gender and hybrid work.

== Academic career ==
Thorn completed a Master's thesis titled Public participation in resource allocation at the University of Canterbury in 1984, and worked as a tourism consultant and an economic analyst at the New Zealand Treasury before moving into academia. She completed a PhD titled Flight of the kiwi: an exploration of motives and behaviours of self-initiated mobility at Massey University in 2008. Thorn joined the faculty of Massey, rising to full professor in 2024. She is Associate Head of the Massey School of Management. Thorn is co-facilitator of a mentoring programme for women graduates, and coordinates an internship programme in the College of Business.

Thorn researches career mobility and the motivations of people living and working abroad, including such topics as 'the brain drain'. She has also investigated gender issues in careers. Her paper on how couples use strategies to manage hybrid work with Dr Joanne Mutter of the University of Auckland won the award for Best Paper Aligned to the Conference Theme – Common Good Human Resources Management at the 5th Human Resources International Conference in 2024. She was also an author of a paper The Return Home: Expectations and Experiences of Self-Initiating Repatriate New Zealanders that won the 2017 Best International Paper award from the Academy of Management.

In 2013 Thorn was awarded the Excellence in Governance Development Award at the inaugural Women in Governance awards, established by Women on Boards New Zealand.

== Selected works ==
- Carr, Stuart; Kerr Inkson; Thorn, Kaye (2005). "From global careers to talent flow: Reinterpreting 'brain drain'". Journal of World Business. 40 (4): 386–398. doi:10.1016/j.jwb.2005.08.006. Wikidata Q125184667.
- Thorn, Kaye (2009). "The relative importance of motives for international self‐initiated mobility". Career Development International. 14 (5): 441–464. doi:10.1108/13620430910989843. Wikidata Q125184661.
- Doherty, Noeleen; Richardson, Julia; Thorn, Kaye (2013). "Self‐initiated expatriation and self‐initiated expatriates". Career Development International. 18 (1): 97–112. doi:10.1108/13620431311305971. Wikidata Q125184659.
- Page, S.J.; Thorn, Kaye (1997). "Towards Sustainable Tourism Planning in New Zealand: Public Sector Planning Responses". Journal of Sustainable Tourism. 5 (1): 59–77. doi:10.1080/09669589708667276. Wikidata Q125184671.
- Doherty, Noeleen; Richardson, Julia; Thorn, Kaye (2013). "Self‐initiated expatriation". Career Development International. 18 (1): 6–11. doi:10.1108/13620431311305917. Wikidata Q125184660.
- Page, Stephen J.; Thorn, Kaye (2002). "Towards Sustainable Tourism Development and Planning in New Zealand: The Public Sector Response Revisited". Journal of Sustainable Tourism. 10 (3): 222–238. doi:10.1080/09669580208667164. Wikidata Q125184668.
