= British Society for Population Studies =

Learned society in the United Kingdom

The British Society for Population Studies is a learned society in the United Kingdom dedicated to promoting the scientific study of biological, economic, historical, medical, social and other disciplines connected with human populations. It is a member of the Academy of Social Sciences. It was founded in 1973. It runs an annual conference at a University venue in the UK, and gives various awards and grants for the furtherance of demographic study.
