= The Facilities Society =

- Formation: 9 December 2008
- Dissolved: May 23, 2023; 3 years ago
- Type: Nonprofit organization

The Facilities Society was founded in the UK on 9 December 2008 as a not-for-profit company limited by guarantee (registered in England nr. 6769050). The Society was dedicated to interdisciplinary and cross-sector academic enterprise to support the needs of the academic community, UK government, businesses, and the public at large. In its role as a learned society, it complemented established institutes and the universities.

Companies House records show the organisation being voluntarily dissolved in May 2023.

The driver for the Society's founding was the absence of a natural home for research into the creation, upgrading and sustainable use of facilities and the related dissemination of findings and knowledge in public and political forums in order to influence policy and practice. Other bodies, institutes and associations acknowledge an interest in facilities, for example in terms of their asset value or operational management. None adopt an interdisciplinary, cross-sector perspective, where the subject of interest is facilities and not the interests of a particular discipline or profession.

The need for a focus on the operational performance of facilities was evident in UK government initiatives, such as the Carbon Trust, which helps to focus attention on actions to improve the energy efficiency of existing buildings and other constructed facilities and thus reduce carbon emissions. The Society's research agenda included measures to reduce embodied and operational carbon in facilities of all kinds.

== Definitions ==
A facility is defined as a physical construct and asset that is designed, engineered and operated to serve a particular function and to fulfil a need or provide a service, such as a building, installation, system or network.

Facilities are needed for living, working, health care, education, industrial production, commercial development, retailing, utilities, transportation and other infrastructure, sports and leisure, entertainment and communication, and are often collectively referred to as the built environment.

== See also ==
- Design management – a general treatment of the subject and not specific to facilities
- Construction management
- Facility management
- Property management
