= Social sciences, humanities and the arts for people and the economy =

SHAPE (social sciences, humanities and the arts for people and the economy) is a collective name for the social sciences, humanities and arts. It was first developed in 2020 by the British Academy, LSE, the Academy of Social Sciences and Arts Council England. SHAPE describes these academic disciplines as those which "help us understand ourselves, others and the human world around us".

The acronym is used by individuals and organisations to explain what the disciplines are and what they do, to illustrate their value and relevance, and to encourage people to study them and use the knowledge and skills gained throughout their careers.

By promoting these subjects under an acronym, the SHAPE initiative highlights the importance of the skills the disciplines teach in observation, interpretation, reasoning and analysis, and in developing transformative solutions to societal challenges in areas such as health, inequality, the environment and the economy. By promoting these subjects, the SHAPE acronym seeks to emphasise parity with STEM subjects, "not in opposition, but as equals and collaborators" in building a better future.

In 2020, the British Academy also established the SHAPE Observatory to monitor the health and development of the humanities and social sciences at system-wide and discipline-specific levels.

== Connected knowledge ==
In 2023, a campaign led by the British Academy showcased examples of interdisciplinary research where SHAPE and STEM worked together and shared skills. Dubbed connected knowledge, these examples demonstrated the value of collaborative SHAPE and STEM research, ranging from rolling out the COVID-19 vaccine to regulating cutting-edge AI technology.
