= Voluntary Action History Society =

British learned society

The Voluntary Action History Society is a learned society that was established in 1991 to promote the historical study and understanding of charity, philanthropy and voluntary organisations. The society is based in the UK but has members and supporters internationally. The society was founded by a group of individuals working in both academia and the voluntary sector, including Colin Rochester and Justin Davis Smith, who felt that the history of voluntary action and charities was being forgotten or ignored.

== History ==
The Voluntary Action History Society was formed because voluntary action was not seen as a subject in its own right, often considered only as a minor part of social policy. Where it was studied historically it was considered an insignificant aspect of social history. The founders believed that all too often studies undertaken were left to academics with little thought of their relevance to those active as researchers and practitioners in the voluntary sector. While some excellent histories of charities were available, they were rarely disseminated in the voluntary sector.

Since its inception the society has carried out a number of activities including running a series of seminars on the history of voluntary action, and hosting conferences and workshops. The society became a registered charity in March 1995. It has also engaged with particular issues affecting the historical study of voluntary action, including the problems facing the archiving of charity history. In the 1990s the society conducted a survey of major voluntary organisations which revealed a number of challenges facing such organisations in archiving their records. In 2011 the society launched a new campaign for charity archives.

== Activities ==
The Voluntary Action History Society carries out a number of activities including:

- Convenes the 'Voluntary Action Seminar' at the Institute of Historical Research, London
- Runs a programme of New Researchers’ workshops held throughout the UK
- Organises biennial research conferences and occasional conferences and symposia
- Edits a blog on topics of interest to historians and contemporary researchers of voluntary action
- Leads a campaign on charity archives, in partnership with others
- Facilitates a Transnational Histories of Voluntary Action network
