= Social Research Association =

Learned society

- Abbreviation: SRA
- Formation: 1978
- Founders: Janet Lewis, Malcolm Cross
- Founded at: United Kingdom and Ireland
- Type: Learned society
- Purpose: Advancement of social research and research ethics
- Region served: United Kingdom and Ireland
- Members: Open to social researchers and practitioners
- Affiliations: Academy of Social Sciences
- Website: the-sra.org.uk

The Social Research Association (SRA) is a British and Irish organisation open to practitioners and researchers interested in all branches of social research. It was founded in 1978 by Janet Lewis and Malcolm Cross, and supported by an active board that included Roger Jowell.

It is a learned society member of the UK Academy of Social Sciences. In addition to the umbrella organisation, it has branches that cater specifically to researchers in Scotland, Wales and Ireland (including both the Republic of Ireland and Northern Ireland). Among other activities, it publishes a code of conduct for social researchers which is widely adopted as a standard of research ethics by funding agencies in the social sciences.
