= British Society of Gerontology =

Learned society

- Formation: 1971
- Type: Non-profit
- Headquarters: United Kingdom

The British Society of Gerontology is a learned society in the United Kingdom dedicated to enhancing knowledge about ageing and later life. It is a member of the Academy of Social Sciences.
