= Economic and Social Research Council =

One of the Research Councils in the United Kingdom

Council overview
- Formed: 1965; 61 years ago
- Status: Council within UK Research and Innovation
- Headquarters: Swindon, Wiltshire, England
- Annual budget: £134 million (FY2024/25)
- Ministers responsible: Liz Kendall MP, Secretary of State for Science, Innovation and Technology; Patrick Vallance, Minister of State for Science, Research and Innovation
- Council executive: Stian Westlake, Executive Chair
- Parent department: Department for Science, Innovation and Technology
- Parent body: UK Research and Innovation
- Website: esrc.ukri.org

The Economic and Social Research Council (ESRC) is a council of UK Research and Innovation (UKRI), a non-departmental public body sponsored by the Department for Science, Innovation and Technology, responsible for funding and support for research and training in the social sciences. It is the UK's largest organisation for funding research on economic and social issues.

== History ==
The ESRC was founded in 1965 as the Social Science Research Council (SSRC – not to be confused with the Social Science Research Council in the United States). The establishment of a state funding body for the social sciences in the United Kingdom, had been under discussion since the Second World War; however, it was not until the 1964 election of Prime Minister Harold Wilson that the political climate for the creation of the SSRC became sufficiently favourable.

The first chief executive of the SSRC was Michael Young (later Baron Young of Dartington). Subsequent holders of the post have included Michael Posner, later Secretary General of the European Science Foundation.

=== Change of name ===
Following the election of Prime Minister Margaret Thatcher in the 1979 general election, the Government expressed reservations about the value of research in the social sciences, and the extent to which it should be publicly funded. In 1981, the Education Secretary Sir Keith Joseph asked Lord Rothschild to lead a review into the future of the SSRC.

It was ultimately decided (due in no small part to the efforts of Michael Posner, chief executive of the SSRC at the time) that the Council should remain, but that its remit should be expanded beyond the social sciences, to include more 'empirical' research and research of 'more public concern'. To reflect this, in 1983 the SSRC was renamed the Economic and Social Research Council.

== Mission ==
The ESRC's mission, according to its website, is to:

- promote and support, by any means, high-quality research and related postgraduate training on social and economic issues
- develop and support the national data infrastructure that underpins high-quality research
- advance knowledge and provide trained social scientists who meet the needs of users and beneficiaries, thereby contributing to the economic competitiveness of the UK, the effectiveness of public services and policy, and the quality of life
- communicate clearly and promote public understanding of social science.

== Description ==
The ESRC is based at Polaris House in Swindon, which is also the location of the head offices of several other councils of UK Research and Innovation: AHRC, BBSRC, EPSRC, Innovate UK, MRC, NERC and STFC, as well as the UK Space Agency. At any one time ESRC supports over 4,000 researchers and postgraduate students in academic institutions and independent research institutes.

== Notable people ==
Chairman:

- 1965 to 1968: Michael Young
- 1969 to 1971: Andrew Shonfield
- 1971 to 1975: Robin Matthews
- 1975 to 1978: Derek Robinson
- 1979 to 1983: Michael Posner
- 1983 to 1987: Douglas Hague
- 1988 to 1994: Howard Newby
- 1994 to 2001: Bruce Smith
- 2001 to ?: Frances Cairncross

Chief Executive:

- 1994 to 1999: Ron Amman
- 2000 to 2002: Gordon Marshall
- 2003 to 2010: Ian Diamond
- 2010 to 2014: Paul Boyle
- 2014 to 2017: Jane Elliott

Executive Chair:

- 2017 to 2020: Jennifer Rubin
- 2021 to 2023: Alison Park
- 2023 to present: Stian Westlake
