= National Centre for Social Research =

UK independent social research institute

- Formation: 1969
- Founders: Sir Roger Jowell, Gerald Hoinville
- Type: Charity (Registered in England and Wales, and Scotland)
- Location: 35 Northampton Square, London, United Kingdom
- Region served: United Kingdom
- Products: Social research
- Key people: Michael Davis (Chief Executive)
- Revenue: £52m (2024)
- Employees: 434 (2024)
- Website: natcen.ac.uk

The National Centre for Social Research (NatCen) is a registered charity and is the largest independent social research institute in the UK. The research charity was founded in 1969 by Sir Roger Jowell and Gerald Hoinville with the aim of carrying out social policy research to improve society. Until 1999, it was known as Social and Community Planning Research and gained a reputation for promoting high standards in survey research and pushing the boundaries of survey methods. It hosted for 25 years the ESRC Survey Methods Centre - later, when ESRC funding was not renewed, known as the SCPR Survey Methods Centre a centre of expertise which carried out methodological research, ran popular seminars and published a regular newsletter. SCPR authors produced a handbook, Survey Research Practice., published by Heinemann in 1978, which remained in print for 20 years and was translated into other languages.

NatCen is best known for its annual British Social Attitudes Survey, founded by the organisation in 1983. The British Social Attitudes survey is Britain's longest-running annual survey of public attitudes and can be accessed for research through the UK Data Service. It uses a random probability method and face to face interviews with more than 3,000 people to help ensure that it achieves a sample that should be representative of a target population. NatCen's sister organisation, the Scottish Centre for Social Research (ScotCen), carries out an equivalent of the survey in Scotland, called the Scottish Social Attitudes survey.

In addition to the British Social Attitudes survey, NatCen collects a number of statistics on behalf of the UK government and government bodies. These include the Health Survey for England, the English Housing Survey, The National Diet and Nutrition Survey and the Study of Early Education and Development (SEED). In 2015 NatCen also launched a new panel survey called the NatCen Panel, which was the first panel survey in the UK to use a probability methodology.

The National Centre for Social Research is not just a survey organisation, however, it is also well regarded for its research using qualitative and evaluation methods. NatCen researchers authored one of the key textbooks for qualitative researchers Qualitative Research Practice published by SAGE Publishing.
