= Society for Research into Higher Education =

The Society for Research into Higher Education (SRHE) is a UK-based international learned society, established in 1965. The organisation provides funding opportunities for those undergoing research on the subject of Higher Education, holds events and seminars, convenes an annual conference on higher education (HE) research and publishes research in this area.

== Networks ==
SRHE events are organised under a range of Networks or groups focussing on a particular area of research. These Networks are currently:

• Academic Practice

• Digital University

• Employability, Enterprise and Work-based Learning

• Higher Education and the COVID-19 Pandemic

• Higher Education Policy

• International Research and Researchers

• Learning, Teaching And Assessment

• Newer Researchers

• Postgraduate Issue

• South West Regional Network

• Technical, Professional and Vocational Higher Education

• The Student Access and Experience Network

The Society also runs a Professional Development Programme of events.

== SRHE International Conference ==
SRHE also hosts an annual international conference usually held in the UK in December, which provides an international forum for researchers, practitioners, and postgraduate students within the field of higher education.

== Awards ==
Annual Research Awards. The Annual Research Awards have been awarded to research and scoping projects since 2011.

Newer Researchers Award. Launched in 1993, this fund is intended to support newer and early career researchers.

Fellowship Fellowship of SRHE is recognition for those who have made a significant contribution in the field of research into higher education, awarded to members of the Society who have achieved a substantial reputation based on a significant body of work achieved over a period of time.
