= Worcestershire Archaeological Society =

British historical society

- Formation: 1854
- Type: Historical society
- Registration no.: 517092
- Legal status: Charity
- Purpose: Historical study and research
- Headquarters: United Kingdom
- Activities: Research, publications, lectures, excursions, and events
- Collections: Library, archives, museum collections
- Chair: Helen Loney
- Website: http://worcestershirearchaeologicalsociety.org.uk/

The Worcestershire Archaeological Society, founded in 1854, is a local historical, antiquarian, and archaeological society and registered charity covering Worcestershire.

== Aims ==
The society exists to "promote the study of any aspect of the archaeology and history relating to the historic county of Worcestershire, to publish the results of research and excavations and to provide lectures and excursions of archaeological, antiquarian and historical interest".

== History ==
The Worcestershire Diocesan Architectural Society, as it was then called, was established at a public meeting in Worcester on 20 June 1854. Its first president was Lord Lyttelton, although its first Secretary, Sir Edmund Lechmere, is more widely considered as "the founder of the Society".

The early years of the Society were heavily influenced by the Oxford Movement. Its original aims were to "promote the study of ecclesiastical architecture, antiquities and design by the collection of books, casts, drawings, etc., and the restoration of mutilated architectural remains within the diocese and to furnish suggestions, so far as may be within its province, for improving the character of ecclesiastical edifices hereafter to be erected or restored". Membership of the Society in this period was essentially diocesan, and was originally restricted to clergymen and lay members of the Church of England.

The Society was renamed the Worcestershire Archaeological Society in 1910, and it began issuing a regular journal, the Transactions of the Worcestershire Archaeological Society, in 1923. Its editors have included major county historians and archaeologists, such as E.A.B. Barnard, Philip Barker, and Robin Whittaker. Since 1967 the Society has also produced a regular bulletin containing news, archaeological reports, local history research, book reviews and event listings, known variously as the Worcestershire Archaeology Newsletter (1967–1974), Worcestershire Archaeology and Local History Newsletter (1974–1995), and the Worcestershire Recorder (1995–).

It was actively involved in the development of rescue archaeology between the 1960s and 1980s, with influential members including Philip Barker and Martin Carver. It has played a major role in supporting the conservation of important historical sites and artefacts from Worcestershire, including Greyfriars, the Bredon Hill Roman coin hoard, and the Habington chest.

In 2018 the Society sponsored the creation of a new archaeology gallery at the Worcestershire County Museum. From 2021 to 2022 it organised the 'Small Pits, Big Ideas' test pitting project in Badsey, Beoley, Bewdley, White Ladies Aston, Wichenford, and Wolverley. This project was awarded the Council for British Archaeology's Community Archaeology Project of the Year prize in July 2023.

In 2025 the Society co-sponsored the publication of a booklet on the Worcestershire Conquest Hoard, which was released to accompany the first exhibition of the hoard at Worcester City Museum and Art Gallery.

The Society also operates a research grant scheme for projects on the archaeology, history, and architectural history of Worcestershire, named after its former Treasurer, Garth Raymer.

The current Chair of the Society is Dr Helen Loney.

== Activities ==
The Society runs an annual programme of public talks and lectures, which are usually held in the winter and early spring.

Since its formation the Society has undertaken summer excursions to sites of archaeological and historical interest. The first excursion took place in September 1854, and involved a tour of the medieval churches of Coventry in conjunction with the Oxford Architectural Society. Recent excursions have included visits to Avoncroft Museum, Chedworth Roman Villa, Hadrian's Wall, and the site of the Battle of Evesham.

The Society maintains a library, which is accessible to members at the Hive in Worcester. It also holds a collection of artefacts, artworks, and other material, which are curated in collaboration with Museums Worcestershire.

== Publications ==
The Society produces two regular publications. Its peer-reviewed journal, the Transactions of the Worcestershire Archaeological Society, is published biennially, and is edited by Dr Shelagh Norton. The Society's bulletin, the Worcestershire Recorder, is published biannually in the spring and autumn, and is edited by Dr Murray Andrews.
