= British Social Attitudes Survey =

UK statistical survey

The British Social Attitudes Survey (BSA) is an annual statistical survey conducted in the UK by the National Centre for Social Research since 1983. The BSA involves in-depth interviews with over 3,000 respondents, selected using random probability sampling, focused on topics including newspaper readership, political parties and trust, public expenditure, welfare benefits, health care, childcare, poverty, the labour market and the workplace, education, charitable giving, the countryside, transport and the environment, the European Union, economic prospects, race, religion, civil liberties, immigration, sentencing and prisons, fear of crime and the portrayal of sex and violence in the media. The survey is funded by government departments, quasi-governmental bodies, charities and think tanks. The BSA was not conducted in 1988 and 1992, when funding was devoted instead to studies of voting behaviour and political attitudes in the British Election Study.

== Findings ==
=== Abortion ===
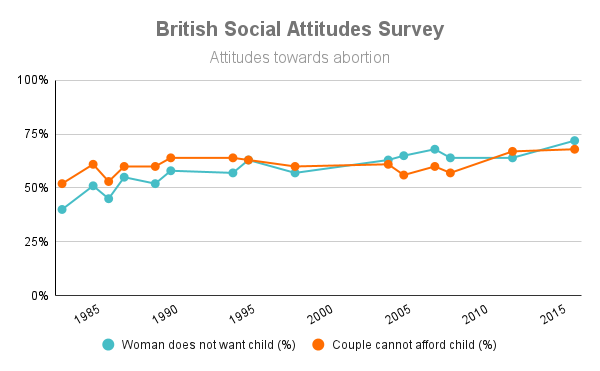
Attitudes towards abortion, 1983–2016

The proportion of people who believe abortion should be allowed if a woman does not want a child has increased gradually during the period from 1983 to 2016, from 40% in 1983 to 72% in 2016. Similarly an increasing number of people believe abortion should be allowed if a couple cannot afford a child, which reached a high of 68% in 2016. Over 90% of people have consistently believed that abortion is acceptable if the pregnancy is a result of rape.

Abortion should be allowed if a woman does not want a child (1983–2016)
1983	1985	1986	1987	1989	1990	1994	1995	1998	2004	2005	2007	2008	2012	2016
40%	51%	45%	55%	52%	58%	57%	63%	57%	63%	65%	68%	64%	64%	72%
Abortion should be allowed if a woman is pregnant as a result of rape (1983–2012)
1983	1985	1986	1987	1989	1990	1994	1995	1998	2004	2005	2007	2008	2012	2016
92%	93%	93%	96%	94%	93%	95%	92%	94%	94%	n/a	n/a	n/a	93%	n/a
Abortion should be allowed if a couple cannot afford a child (1983–2016)
1983	1985	1986	1987	1989	1990	1994	1995	1998	2004	2005	2007	2008	2012	2016
52%	61%	53%	60%	60%	64%	64%	63%	60%	61%	56%	60%	57%	67%	68%

=== Capital punishment ===
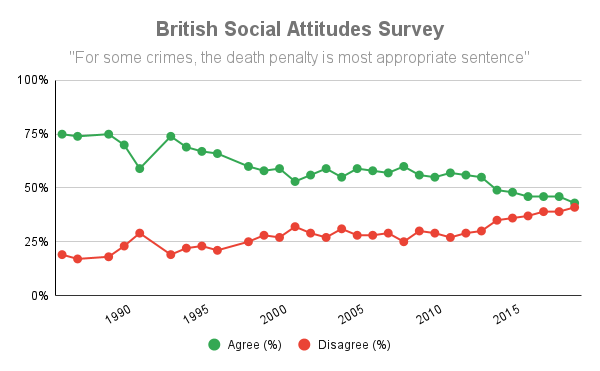
"For some crimes, the death penalty is the most appropriate sentence"

Support for the death penalty has gradually decreased from 75% in 1986 to 43% in 2019. From 2014 onwards, less than half of people supported the use of capital punishment.

For some crimes, the death penalty is the most appropriate sentence: Strongly agree/Agree (1986–2019)
1986	1987	1989	1990	1991	1993	1994	1995	1996	1998	1999	2000	2001	2002	2003	2004
75%	74%	75%	70%	59%	74%	69%	67%	66%	60%	58%	59%	53%	56%	59%	55%
2005	2006	2007	2008	2009	2010	2011	2012	2013	2014	2015	2016	2017	2018	2019	2020
59%	58%	57%	60%	56%	55%	57%	56%	55%	49%	48%	46%	46%	46%	43%	n/a

=== Economic inequality ===
==== Income redistribution ====
Government should redistribute income to those less well off: Strongly agree/Agree (1986–2019)
1986	1987	1989	1990	1991	1993	1994	1995	1996	1998	1999	2000	2001	2002	2003	2004
44%	46%	51%	50%	50%	45%	52%	48%	44%	39%	37%	39%	38%	40%	43%	32%
2005	2006	2007	2008	2009	2010	2011	2012	2013	2014	2015	2016	2017	2018	2019	2020
33%	34%	33%	39%	37%	36%	38%	42%	43%	40%	45%	43%	43%	43%	40%	n/a

==== Wealth distribution ====
Ordinary working people do not get a fair share of the nation's wealth: Strongly agree/Agree (1986–2019)
1986	1987	1989	1990	1991	1993	1994	1995	1996	1998	1999	2000	2001	2002	2003	2004
66%	65%	66%	66%	69%	62%	n/a	68%	66%	65%	62%	63%	61%	64%	62%	55%
2005	2006	2007	2008	2009	2010	2011	2012	2013	2014	2015	2016	2017	2018	2019	2020
56%	56%	60%	61%	61%	57%	59%	62%	60%	61%	60%	60%	62%	63%	59%	n/a

=== LGBT rights ===
==== Same-sex relationships ====
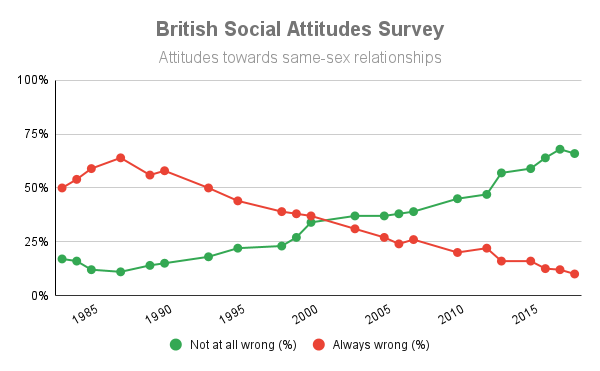
Attitudes towards same-sex relationships, 1986–2012

17% of people believed same-sex relationships were 'not wrong at all' in 1983 and the proportion of people holding this view reached a low of 11% in 1987 during the height of the AIDS pandemic. An increasing number of people were comfortable with same-sex relationships during the period 1989-2017 and as of 2018 66% of people do not consider same-sex relationships to be 'wrong at all'.

Same-sex relationships are "not wrong at all" (1983–2018)
1983	1984	1985	1987	1989	1990	1993	1995	1998	1999	2000
17%	16%	12%	11%	14%	15%	18%	22%	23%	27%	34%
2003	2005	2006	2007	2010	2012	2013	2015	2016	2017	2018
37%	37%	38%	39%	45%	47%	57%	59%	64%	68%	66%

==== Transgender rights ====
Attitudes towards transgender people were first examined in the 2016 report, which found that 49% of people view prejudice against transgender people as "always wrong", compared with 6% who believe it is "rarely or never wrong". 34% of people believed prejudice against transgender people is only "mostly" or "sometimes" wrong.

=== Social security ===
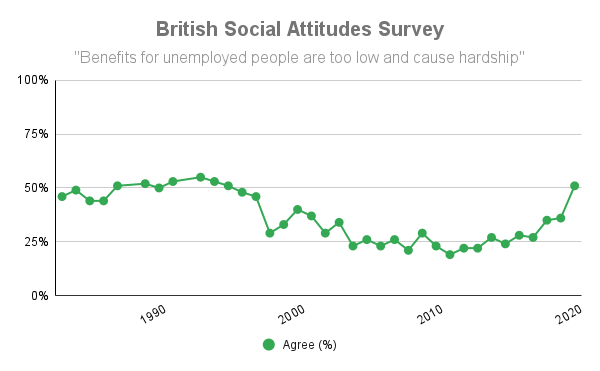
"Benefits for unemployed people are too low and cause hardship"

From 1983 until the late 1990s, most people thought that benefits for the unemployed were too low and caused hardship. Following the election of the Labour government in 1997, there was a sharp decline in this view and the majority of people now believed that unemployment benefit was too high until 2016, when an increasing number of people began to consider unemployment benefits as too low and the proportion of people holding this view reached a twenty five year high of 51% in 2020.

Benefits for unemployed people are too low and cause hardship (1983–2020)
1983	1984	1985	1986	1987	1989	1990	1991	1993	1994	1995	1996	1997	1998	1999	2000	2001	2002
46%	49%	44%	44%	51%	52%	50%	53%	55%	53%	51%	48%	46%	29%	33%	40%	37%	29%
2003	2004	2005	2006	2007	2008	2009	2010	2011	2012	2013	2014	2015	2016	2017	2018	2019	2020
34%	23%	26%	23%	26%	21%	29%	23%	19%	22%	22%	27%	24%	28%	27%	35%	36%	51%

=== Employment and job satisfaction ===
British workers' job satisfaction has fallen to its lowest level ever recorded, according to research published on November 2, 2026, with dissatisfaction with employers over pay and working conditions rising. Analysis by the Resolution Foundation of the British Social Attitudes survey shows that a lack of flexible working, job insecurity, and a loss of autonomy have undermined workers' views of their employment. Job satisfaction has fallen from 81% in 2015 to 74%, the lowest figure recorded in the British Social Attitudes survey since 1989, when the question was first asked.

=== Security and international alliances ===
A NatCen survey reported in November 2026 found that 78% of people in Britain view Israel as a "serious threat to world peace". This figure was 48% in 2005. The survey also found Iran at 75% and the US at 74% — both below Israel's 78%. Among backers of the different parties, the view was most common among Green supporters (88%) and least common among Reform UK supporters (62%).

== See also ==
- Scottish Social Attitudes Survey
