= Academy of Social Sciences =

Learned society in the United Kingdom

- Formation: 1982; 44 years ago
- Type: Learned society
- Headquarters: 33 Finsbury Square, London, EC2A 1AG
- President: Roger Goodman
- Chief Executive: Rita Gardner
- Website: acss.org.uk

The Academy of Social Sciences (AcSS) is a representative body for social sciences in the United Kingdom. The academy promotes social science through its sponsorship of the Campaign for Social Science, its links with Government on a variety of matters, and its own policy work in issuing public comment, responding to official consultations, and organising meetings and events about social science. It confers the title of Fellow upon nominated social scientists following a process of peer review. The academy comprises over 1000 fellows and 41 learned societies based in the UK and Europe.

== History and structure ==
The academy's origins lie in the formation of a representative body for the social science learned societies in 1982, the Association of Learned Societies in the Social Sciences (ALSISS). From 1999 to 2007 it was called the Academy of Learned Societies for the Social Sciences before changing to its current name. The academy is run by a council of 21 members, with Professor Roger Goodman FAcSS as its current chair, and Professor Sir Ivor Crewe FAcSS, Master of University College, Oxford, as its current president. Seven council members are elected by the academy's fellows, 7 by its learned societies and seven are appointed. Since 2019, its chief executive has been Rita Gardner FAcSS.

=== List of presidents ===
- 2003–2008: Bhikhu Parekh, Baron Parekh
- 2008–2013: Sir Howard Newby
- 2014–2019: Sir Ivor Crewe
- 2020–present: Roger Goodman

== Advocacy ==
The academy advocates social science by interacting with Government and other organisations, and co-ordinates the responses of social scientists to Government consultation documents. Past consultations include:

- Independent Review of Implementation of RCUK Policy on Open Access.
- Public Administration Select Committee Enquiry on 'Building Civil service Skills for the Future'
- The Office for National Statistics consultation on the future of the Census

The academy also puts forward suggestions to the Government about which social scientists should carry out its Foresight research projects, which look at important issues and how these might change over the next 20 to 80 years.

A developing part of the academy's work is to bring researchers and organisations using research closer together to improve the evidence upon which public policy is based and to increase the impact of research.

== Publications and events ==
The academy has produced a series of "Making the Case for the Social Sciences" booklets which give examples of important social science research which has made a difference to policy or practice. These are: Wellbeing; Ageing; Sustainability; the Environment and Climate Change; Crime; Sport and Leisure; Management; Scotland; Longitudinal Studies, Mental Wellbeing, Wales and Dementia. Further titles are in preparation. The academy also publishes a cross-disciplinary peer-reviewed journal, Contemporary Social Science. The academy holds regular events, such as conferences on the ethics of social media research and the future of the Research Excellence Framework. It holds an annual lecture each summer, and its President's Lunch each winter. It also arranges (with the British Library) a public lecture series Enduring Ideas.

== Fellows ==
Part of the academy's work is to recognise social scientists who are held in esteem by their peer group and whose life and work have had an impact in advancing social science. They are nominated and the nominations are then subject to peer review. Fellows are academics, policy-makers and practitioners, and are entitled to use the letters "FAcSS" after their name. In November 2014 there were 1000 Fellows, just over 1% of the 90,000 total membership of the 41 learned society members of the academy.

Fellows were previously known as academicians and used the post-nominal letter "AcSS". This was changed in July 2014 to bring the academy in line with other British learned societies.

== Campaign for Social Science ==
The Academy launched the Campaign for Social Science in January 2011 to advocate social science to Government and the general public. The Campaign is self-funded. It has campaigned for the restoration of the post of Government Chief Social Scientific Adviser, promotes social science in the media and on the web, and organises roadshows around the country to emphasise the value and importance of social science.

== Member societies ==
- Association of Law Teachers
- Association for Psychosocial Studies
- Association of Social Anthropologists
- Association for Tourism in Higher Education
- British Accounting & Finance Association
- British Association for American Studies
- British Association for Applied Linguistics
- British Association for International & Comparative Education
- British Academy of Management
- British Association for Slavonic & East European Studies
- British Educational Research Association
- British International Studies Association
- British Psychological Society
- British Sociological Association
- British Society of Criminology
- British Society of Gerontology
- British Society for Population Studies
- Council for Hospitality Management Education
- Development Studies Association
- Economic History Society
- European Academy of Occupational Health Psychology
- Government Economic Service
- Government Social Research
- Housing Studies Association
- Joint University Council
- Leisure Studies Association
- Media, Communications & Cultural Studies Association
- Political Studies Association
- Regional Studies Association
- Regional Science Association International
- Royal Anthropological Institute
- Royal Economic Society
- Royal Geographical Society
- Royal Statistical Society
- Royal Town Planning Institute
- Scottish Economic Society
- Society of Legal Scholars
- Social Policy Association
- Social Research Association
- Social Services Research Group
- Society for Research into Higher Education
- Society for Studies in Organizing Healthcare
- Socio-Legal Studies Association
- UK Evaluation Society

== See also ==
- Campaign for Social Science
- Social Sciences, Humanities and the Arts for People and the Economy (SHAPE)

== Sources ==
- Blunkett, David (4 February 2000). "Influence or irrelevance?". Times Higher Education.
- Richards, Huw (24 December 1999). "Beyond the Tweed: where social scientists can raise their voices". Times Higher Education.
- MacLeod, Donald (January 29, 2003). "Russell group applauds higher white paper". The Guardian.
- The SAGE Encyclopedia of Higher Education (SAGE Publications, 2020)
