= Stem =

"Stem," "stem," or "STEM" commonly refers to:

- Plant stem, a structural axis of a vascular plant
- STEM, an acronym for science, technology, engineering, and mathematics

"Stem," "stem," or "STEM" can also refer to:

== Language and writing ==
- Word stem, part of a word responsible for its lexical meaning
  - Stemming, a process in natural language processing
- Stem (typography), the main vertical stroke of a letter
- Stem, the opening of a multiple-choice question

== Music and audio ==
- Stem (audio), a collection of audio sources mixed together to be dealt with downstream as one unit
- Stem (music), a part of a written musical note
- Stem mixing and mastering, a method of mixing audio material
- The Stems, an Australian garage punk band
- "Stem" (DJ Shadow song), 1996
- "Stem" (Ringo Sheena song), 2003
- "Stem," a song by Hayden from the 1995 album Everything I Long For
- "Stem", a song by Static-X from the 1999 album Wisconsin Death Trip
- "Die Stem van Suid-Afrika," or "Die Stem," the national anthem of South Africa during the apartheid era

== Science, technology and transportation ==
- Scanning transmission electron microscopy, a type of microscopy
- Spatiotemporal Epidemiological Modeler, free software
- Stem, part of a compound variable in the Rexx computer programming language
- Stem (bicycle part), connecting the handlebars to the steerer tube of a bicycle fork
- Stem (ship), the most forward part of a boat or ship's bow
- Stem in path (computing) usually stands for a filename without last extension (file.tar.gz is file.tar)
- Stem, part of a watch
- STEM, an acronym for science, technology, engineering, and mathematics

== Other uses ==
- Stem, a detail of stemware
  - Stem (glass), the stem of a drinking glass
- Stem (lesbian), or soft butch, who exhibits some stereotypical butch traits
- Stem (skiing), a technique in skiing
- Stem, North Carolina, U.S., a town
- STEM.org, an American multinational education company
- Stemming, a term in climbing
- Upgrade (film), a 2018 film, originally released as STEM, featuring an AI chip called STEM

== See also ==
- Stemm (disambiguation)
- STEM Academy (disambiguation)
- Stem cell, an undifferentiated biological cell that can differentiate into specialized cells
- Stem group, or crown group, in phylogenetics
- Main stem, the primary downstream segment of a river
