= Comstock High School =

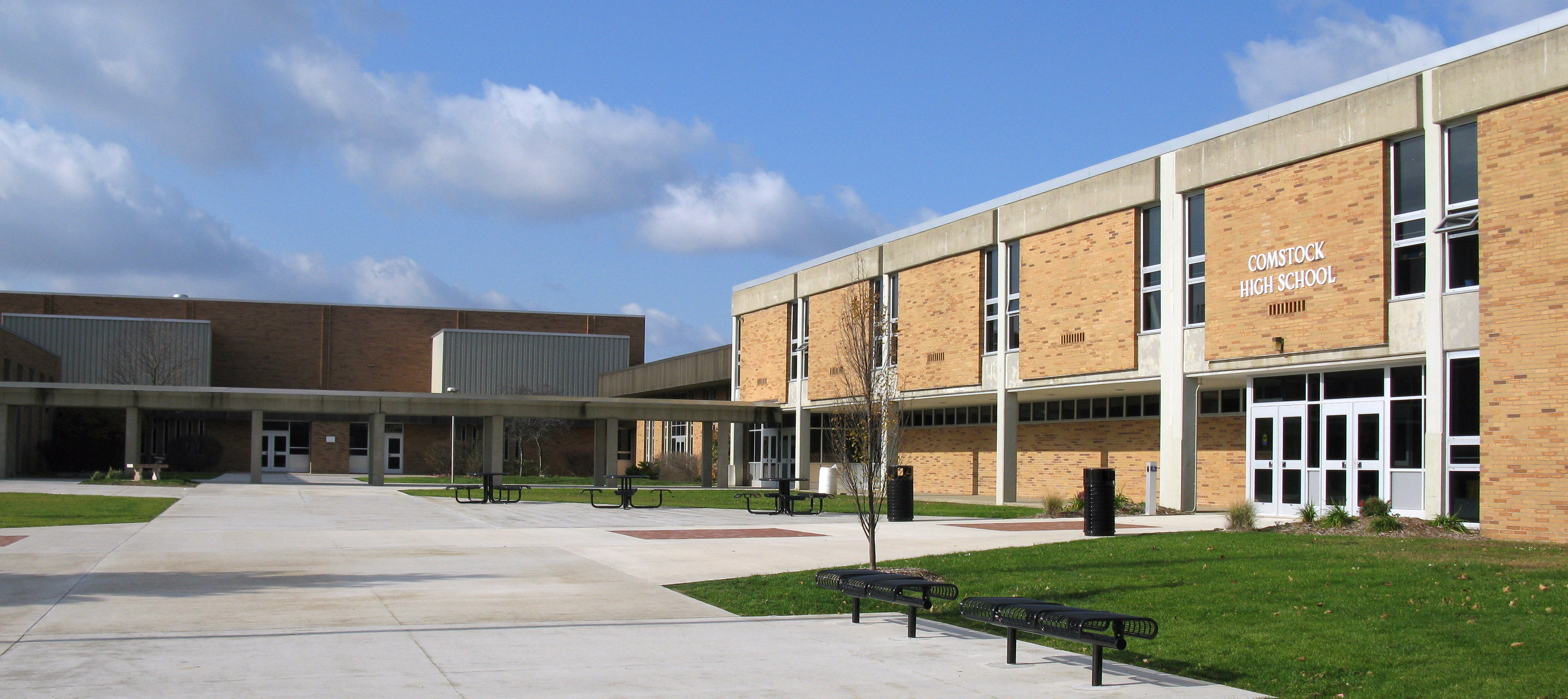
- Comstock High School, 1967 to present

Location
- 2107 North 26th Street; Kalamazoo, Michigan 49048; United States; 42.307943°N 85.517750°W

Information
- School type: Public, rural
- Motto: Celebrating Excellence
- Established: 1906
- School district: Comstock Public School District
- Superintendent: Dr. Jeffrey J. Thoenes
- Principal: Mary Spade
- Teaching staff: 20.72
- Grades: 9–12
- Enrollment: 367 (2023–2024)
- Average class size: 18
- Student to teacher ratio: 17.71
- Classes offered: AP, college credit, vocational, dual enrollment, online
- Schedule: Semester
- Campus: Rural
- Campus size: 25 acres
- Colors: Columbia blue and white
- Fight song: Go You Fighting Colts
- Athletics conference: Southwest 10 Conference
- Mascot: Colts
- Rival: Parchment
- Yearbook: Comstock Corral
- Communities served: Comstock Township
- Website: www.comstockps.org

Comstock High School is a secondary school within the Comstock Public School District located in Comstock Township near the city of Kalamazoo, Michigan, United States. Comstock High School primarily serves the western half of Comstock Township, as well as portions of Kalamazoo Township, Pavilion Township, the city of Portage, and the city of Kalamazoo. Enrollment at Comstock High School averages around 650 students (2,500 students district-wide).

Students within the district have the option to enroll at Comstock Compass High School, which is an alternative to the traditional high school classes provided at Comstock High School.

Comstock High School was named one of America's best high schools by U.S. News & World Report in 2010.

== History ==
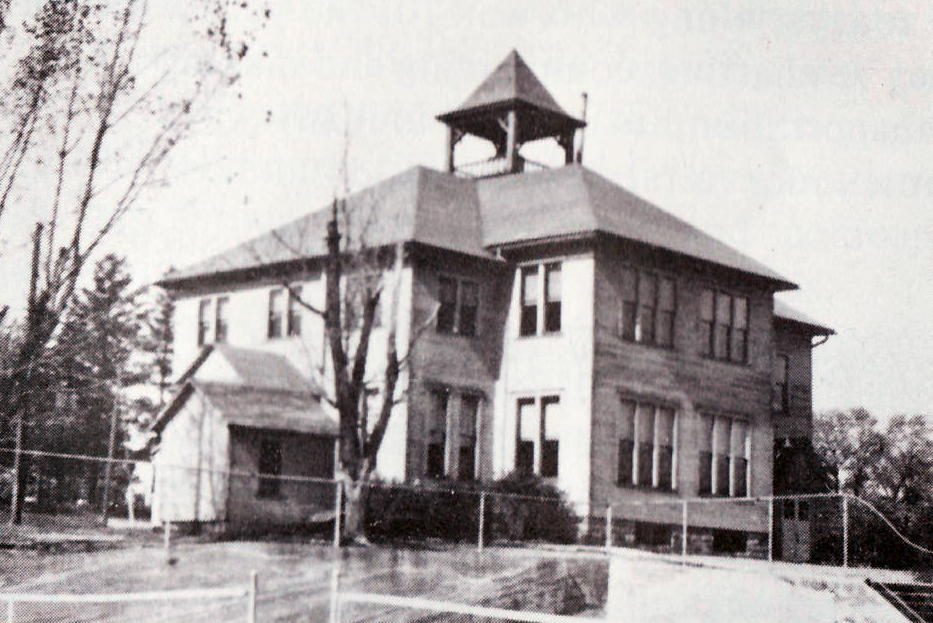
Comstock High School, 1906-1941

A high school was established at the Comstock Village School in 1906 following the consolidation of the Comstock School District with five neighboring districts. Prior to 1905, students in Comstock Township had to travel to Kalamazoo or Galesburg to attend high school. Eight students graduated from Comstock School in 1908, making up Comstock's first high school graduating class. Conflicts between the residents in the community eventually led to the dissolution of the consolidated district in 1916, including the high school at Comstock School.

Comstock School was expanded in 1921 with the construction of a new middle school adjacent to the old school. A new high school was established in the older building and was renamed Comstock High School. A gymnasium and auditorium was constructed on the campus in 1937 through a Public Works Administration project. In 1942, a new high school building was built adjacent to the middle school. The 44-year-old Comstock School was torn down the following year.

Following the construction of a new General Motors fabrication plant for Fisher Body in Comstock Township, a new high school and football stadium were built, which stand as the present high school. Since its construction in 1966, the high school campus on 26th street has seen improvements over the years including the construction of a 750-seat community auditorium in 1992, and a new 3,500 seat athletic stadium in 2007.

In 2005, voters rejected a 26-year bond proposal to replace the current high school, opting instead to renovate the building.

== College and career academy ==
Comstock High School is a college and career preparatory school that provides students with a rigorous four years intended to prepare them for post-secondary educations and careers. Students are encouraged to enroll in the many Advanced Placement courses offered, or to dual enroll at Kalamazoo Valley Community College or Western Michigan University to earn college credits prior to graduating high school. Students also attend lectures by community members, business leaders, and college representatives to learn about careers in various fields including business, engineering, finance, and health care.

== Athletics ==
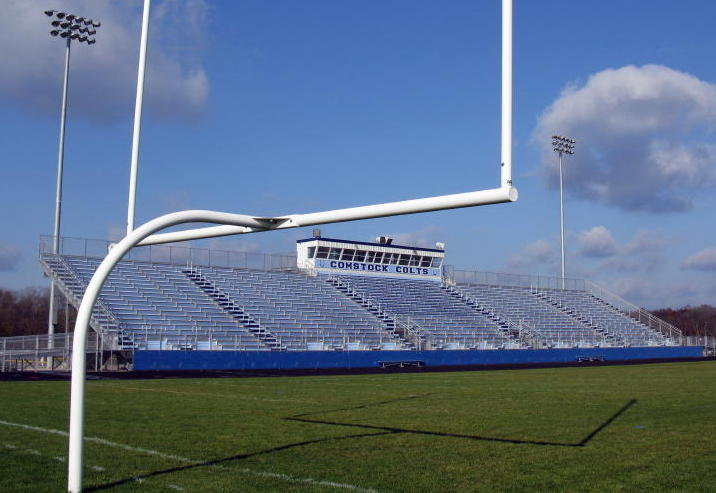
Comstock Stadium, rebuilt in 2008

Comstock High School is a member of the Southwest 10 Conference.

- Class: B-4
- Mascot: Colts
- Colors: North Carolina blue and white
- Fall Sports: Football, Cross Country, Volleyball, Sideline Cheer, Girls' Golf, Boys' Tennis, Boys' Soccer
- Winter Sports: Basketball, Bowling, Competitive Cheer, Wrestling, Hockey (club), Ski (club)
- Spring Sports: Baseball, Softball, Track and Field, Girls' Soccer, Girls' Tennis, Boys' golf

Comstock High School benefits from an active athletics booster club that generates money for the purchase of uniforms, equipment, and other athletic facility improvements.

Former athletes, teams, coaches, and other contributors to the school's athletics are recognized by the Comstock High School Athletics Hall of Fame, which was established in 2009.

=== First athletic teams ===
The first team sponsored by Comstock School was a baseball team in 1908. Within a few years the school also had a boys' and girls' basketball team and a girls' tennis team. 1923 was the inaugural year for the Comstock High School football team, which ended its season with a 7-1-1 record.

In 1940, a contest was held to choose a mascot for Comstock High School. The winning name was the Colts, which is still used today.

The Comstock football team started competing in the Bi-River Valley Conference, which eventually became known as the Kalamazoo Valley Association. Comstock eventually moved to the Wolverine Conference in 1970, where it competed through 2013. In 2005 Comstock Varsity football completed its best season in school history; finishing 10-2 and winning the Wolverine Conference out right for the first time in almost 20 years. In 2014, Comstock re-joined the Kalamazoo Valley Association. In 2015, Comstock joined the BCS League. Starting in the Fall of 2021, Comstock joined the Southwest 10 Conference.

== Arts and music ==
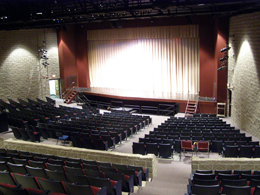
Comstock Community Center for the Performing Arts, constructed in 1992

- Marching band
- Concert band
- Pep band
- Mixed choir
- Varsity choir
- Show choir
- Drama
- Visual arts

== Clubs and activities ==
- National Honor Society
- Student Lighthouse
- Yearbook
- Key Club

Alongside many more student-led clubs that are participated in every Friday. Students have a say in what clubs are offered, what clubs they’re in and what activities they do.
