= Pre-STEM =

A pre-STEM program is a course of study at any two-year college that prepares a student to transfer to a four-year school to earn a bachelor's degree in a STEM field.

== Overview ==
The concept of a pre-STEM program is being developed to address America's need for more college-trained professionals in science, technology, engineering, and mathematics (STEM). It is an innovation meant to fill a gap at community colleges that do not have 'major' degree paths that students identify with on their way to earning an Associates degree. Students must complete a considerable amount of STEM coursework before transferring from a two-year school to a four-year school and earn a baccalaureate degree in a STEM field. Schools with a pre-STEM program are able to identify those students and support them with STEM-specific academic and career advising, increasing the student's chances of going on to earn a STEM baccalaureate degree in a timely fashion.

With over 50% of America's college-bound students starting their college career at public or private two-year school, and with a very small proportion of students who start college at a two-year school matriculating to and earning STEM degrees from four-year schools, pre-STEM programs have great potential for broadening participation in baccalaureate STEM studies.

== Example programs ==
The effectiveness of pre-STEM programs is being investigated by a consortium of schools in Missouri: Moberly Area Community College, St. Charles Community College, Metropolitan Community College, and Truman State University.

A larger group of schools met at the Belknap Springs Meetings in October 2009 to discuss the challenges and opportunities presented by STEM-focused partnerships between 2-year and 4-year schools. Each program represented a two-year school and a four-year school that were trying to increase the number of people who earn a baccalaureate degree in a STEM area through various means, some of which were pre-STEM programs. Other methods includes summer research experiences for community college students, enhanced support for community college students once they transfer to a four-year school, or simply understanding the challenges STEM transfer students face. This meeting was made possible by funding from the National Science Foundation. All participants were funded by an NSF STEP grant at the time of the meeting.

== See also ==
- STEM pipeline
- STEM Academy
- STEAM fields
