= Stemm =

Stemm may refer to:

- Stemm (band), an American metal band
- STEMM, abbreviation for Science, technology, engineering, mathematics, and medicine
- Stemm, Indiana, a community in the US

== See also ==
- Stem (disambiguation)
- Stemme, a German light aircraft manufacturer
