= Andrew B. Raupp =

American educator

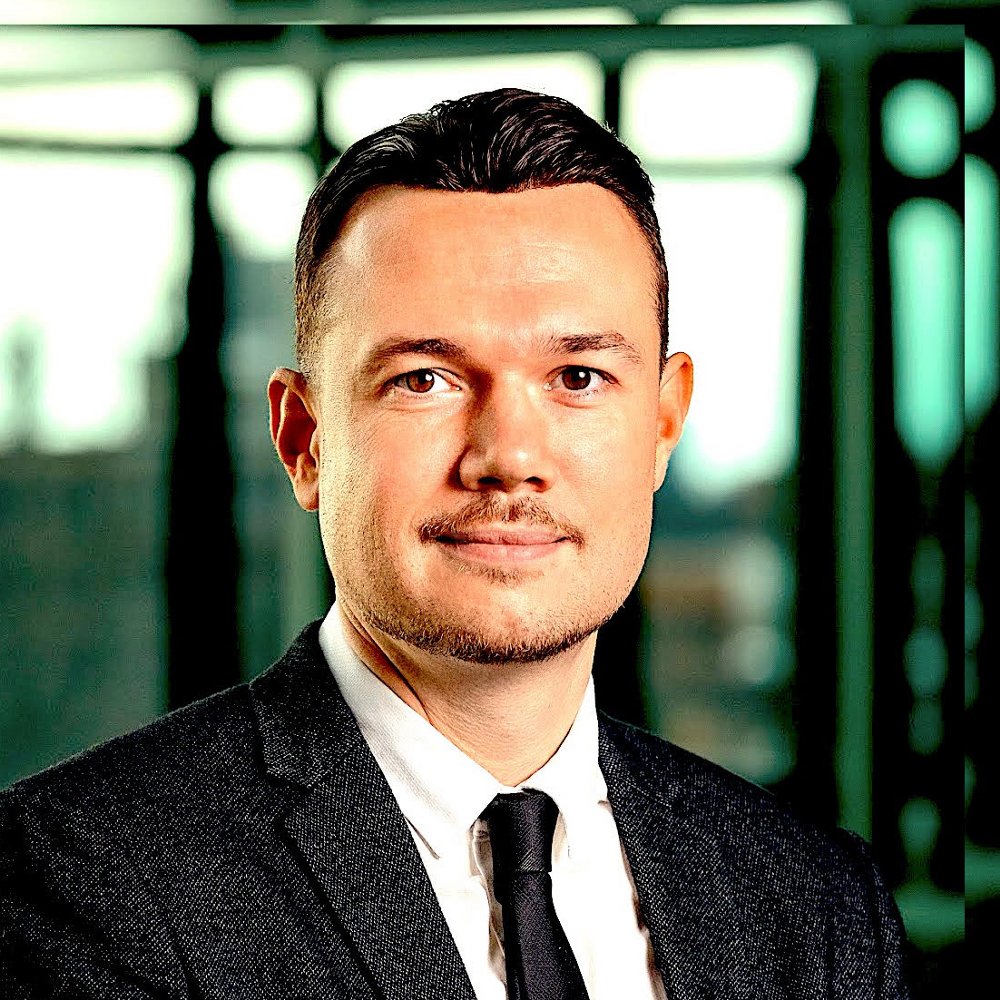
- Born: Detroit, MI USA
- Occupations: Educationist, Journalist, Thinker, Logician and Executive
- Years active: 2001 - Present
- Known for: Chronicling and crafting the linguistics to better define the STEM education movement
- Notable work: Founder & CEO STEM.org
- Spouse: Ellina Raupp

Andrew B. Raupp (born in Detroit, Michigan) is an American entrepreneur, educator, and leading advocate for science, technology, engineering, and mathematics (STEM) education. He is the founder and executive director of STEM.org Educational Research, a pioneering organization at the forefront of STEM research and quality assurance. Raupp is known for his groundbreaking work in establishing a decentralized framework for validating STEM credentials, leveraging blockchain technology's immutable and transparent characteristics. This initiative underscores his dedication to enhancing accountability and democratizing access to STEM education standards, aligning with the broader decentralization principles central to blockchain and Web3 innovations.

Raupp's scholarly contributions extend to the comprehensive documentation and analysis of the STEM education movement's evolution. His research is considered one of the most authoritative and comprehensive chronologies in the field. It has been cited by institutions, including the Smithsonian Science Education Center, which reinforces his status as a significant contributor to 21st-century STEM education.

== Early life and career ==
Andrew B. Raupp was born and raised in the United States and also holds citizenship in the Republic of Malta. He attended Divine Child High School in Dearborn, Michigan, graduating in 1998. From 1998 to 2000, he studied microbiology at Wayne State University before earning both an Associate of Science and an Associate of Arts degree from Henry Ford College in 2002. He completed a Bachelor of Science degree at the University of Michigan–Dearborn in 2006.

In 2001, Raupp launched Initiative Science, a community outreach project serving youth in southwest Detroit. The initiative later grew into STEM.org Educational Research™, an organization that has expanded its educational quality-assurance network to more than eighty countries. In 2005, he contributed to the development of the framework for the first STEM Congressional Caucus at the request of Congressman Vern Ehlers.

Raupp continued his professional development through national fellowship programs. In 2013, he was selected as a Fellow in the Emerging Leaders Program at the Harvard Kennedy School. He later joined the Education Policy Fellowship Program at Michigan State University during the 2017–2018 academic year.

In 2017, Raupp was appointed the inaugural Chairman of the EdTech and FinTech subcommittees within the Forbes Technology Council and helped establish the Newsweek Expert Forum. That same year, his K-12 STEM school research appeared in a Newsweek cover feature and authored a widely circulated Forbes article examining blockchain technology and its role in emerging innovation frameworks.

He is also an editorial contributor for Fast Company and other national outlets.

== Selected articles ==
- A STEM state of mind: No magic kit or subscription required
- Competition versus collaboration in STEM education
- How Advancements In AI Could Radically Change The Way Children Learn In The Classroom
- Insights Into Early STEM Learning
- The Rise Of The STEM Toy
- Ethics in STEM Education: Going Beyond the Classroom
- "Know Thyself": A Socratic Approach to Modern STEM Education
- Safeguarding Ideas In The Age Of Digital Censorship: Lessons From The Gutenberg Revolution
- Beyond the "Fourth Industrial Revolution": Why We Must Invest in STEM Education

== Awards and recognition ==
- Service to Education Award by the Qatari Supreme Education Council
- Emerging Leader by the John F. Kennedy School of Government at Harvard University
