= NASA RealWorld-InWorld Engineering Design Challenge =

Engineering design challenge

The NASA Real World-In World Engineering Design Challenge is an educational program targeting students in grades 7–12 to foster skills relevant to STEM careers. The program is structured into two phases: project-based learning and team competitions. Participants tackle engineering challenges, collaborating with university students and mentors in a virtual reality environment. The projects focus on technologies such as the James Webb Space Telescope and the Robonaut 2 humanoid robot. The Real World-In World initiative is a collaboration among NASA, the National Institute of Aerospace (NIA), and USA TODAY Education. It builds on the foundation of the Sight/Insight design challenge by NASA and USA TODAY Education, and the Virtual Exploration Sustainability Challenge (VESC), a joint effort of NIA and NASA.

== Scheme followed in 2011 ==
=== Phase 1: RealWorld ===
==== Participants ====
Teachers, coaches, and high school-aged students who are involved in the RealWorld-InWorld Engineering Design Challenge collaborated to address engineering problems inspired by NASA.

==== Objective ====
Small teams of high school students and coaches or teachers worked together on two real-world problems associated with either the James Webb Space Telescope or Robonaut 2. The final project solutions submitted by teams were showcased on the RealWorld-InWorld website.

=== Phase 2: InWorld ===
==== Participants ====
Participating college students form teams consisting of 3-5 high school-aged students and their teacher or coach. Each team chose an engineering mentor from among the participants. Many of the participants were also involved in NASA's INSPIRE program.

==== Objective ====
To collaborate within a 3D virtual environment to improve designs and generate 3D models of the James Webb Space Telescope and Robonaut 2. Engineers from both projects engaged in virtual conversations within the InWorld phase of the challenge. In contrast to the RealWorld phase, the InWorld challenge took place in a virtual environment hosted within the NIA Universe virtual reality world. Teams developed and constructed their solutions to the given problems within this virtual setting.
