= Comstock Public Schools =

School district in Michigan

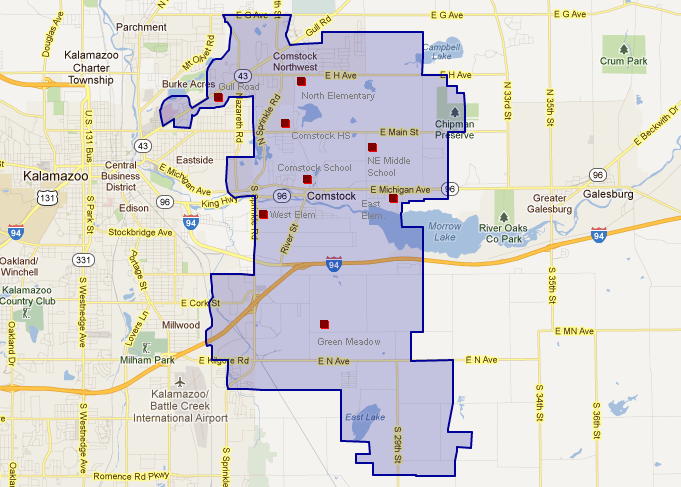
- Comstock Public School District

Address
- 6138 King Highway Kalamazoo, Kalamazoo County, Michigan, 49048; United States
- Coordinates: 42.3136°N 85.5425°W

District information
- Grades: Pre-Kindergarten-12
- Superintendent: Dr. Jeffrey J. Thoenes
- Schools: 5
- Budget: $38,778,000 2022-2023 expenditures
- NCES District ID: 2610590

Students and staff
- Students: 1,871 (2024-2025)
- Teachers: 129.8 (on an FTE basis) (2024-2025)
- Staff: 276.47 FTE (2024-2025)
- Student–teacher ratio: 14.41 (2024-2025)

Other information
- Website: www.comstockps.org

Comstock Public Schools is a public school district near Kalamazoo, Michigan. It serves parts of Kalamazoo, Portage, Eastwood, Comstock Northwest, and parts of the townships of Comstock, Kalamazoo Township, and Pavilion.

== History ==
Comstock Village School was built in 1833 on land donated by Horace H. Comstock and was the first school in the village of Comstock. The school was located on Gull Prairie Road (now 26th street) across from Peer Pond. This one room 12' x 14' building was also used as the town hall and a church for many years. A fire destroyed the school building in 1898, and a new two room school was constructed the following year on the same location.

=== Early consolidated district ===
In 1906, the school districts of Comstock Village, Chenery, Simmons, Maple Grove, Stowell, and Knapp were combined to become one of the first consolidated school districts in the State of Michigan. The new consolidated district covered 18 square miles with Comstock Village School located in the center. A high school was also established at Comstock School for the students within the new district. Prior to 1906, students in Comstock Township would have to travel to Kalamazoo or Galesburg to attend high school. Comstock School was expanded in 1907 with the addition of second story to accommodate additional students. In 1908 there were 189 students and six teachers in the school. Eight students graduated from Comstock School in 1908, making up Comstock's first high school graduating class.

=== New high school established ===
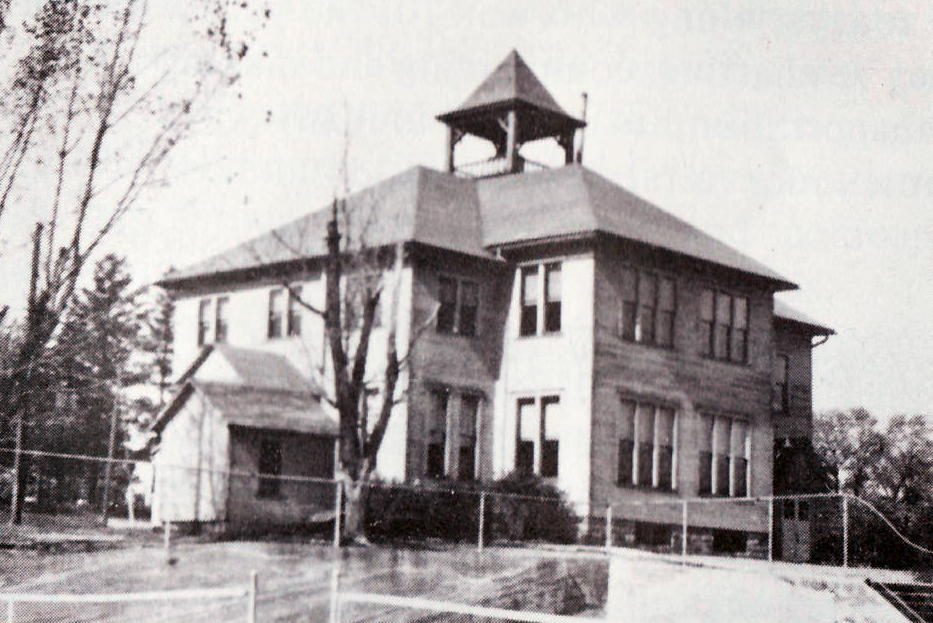
Comstock High School, 1906-1941

Comstock School was expanded in 1921 with the construction of a new middle school adjacent to the old school. A new high school was established in the older building and was renamed Comstock High School. A gymnasium and auditorium was constructed on the school campus in 1937 through a Public Works Administration project. In 1942, a new high school building was built adjacent to the middle school. The 44-year-old Comstock School building was torn down the following year.

=== First athletic teams ===
The first team sponsored by Comstock School was a baseball team in 1908. Within a few years Comstock School also had a boys and girls basketball team and a girls tennis team. 1923 was the inaugural year for the Comstock High School football team, which ended its season with a 7-1-1 record. In 1940, a contest was held to choose a mascot for Comstock High School. The winning name chosen was the Colts, which is still used today. The Comstock football team started competing in the Bi-River Valley Conference, which eventually became known as the Kalamazoo Valley Association. Comstock eventually moved to the Wolverine Conference in 1967. Declining enrollment force Comstock to leave the Wolverine Conference in 2013, when it rejoined the KVA. The following year the KVA disbanded and Comstock was forced again to seek a new conference. In 2015 Comstock joined the Berrien-Cass-St. Joe League (BCS).

=== The growth years ===
Two new elementary schools were constructed in 1950, West Elementary and East Elementary. A third elementary school was built in 1958 on the district's north side and named North Elementary. The district boundaries grew in 1962 with the consolidation of the Gull Road School located on the district's east side in Kalamazoo Township, and again in 1965 with the inclusion of the Green Meadow School located in the south-western portion of Comstock Township and serving portions of Pavilion and Portage Townships. With the addition of Gull Road and Green Meadow, the total number of elementary schools in the district grew to five.

Following the construction of a General Motors fabrication plant in Comstock Township in 1965, a new high school and football stadium was built one mile north of the old high school building. In 1972, a new middle school was constructed on 28th street one mile northeast of the old Central Middle School and was named Comstock Northeast Middle School. An alternative high school was established in 1979 and was located in the old high school building. The student population within the Comstock Public School District peaked at over 3,200 students in the mid-1970s.

=== General Motors dispute ===
In 1983, the Comstock School District was faced with an appeal by General Motors for the amount of the tax assessment placed on their fabrication plant located in Comstock Township. After a lengthy court battle, the dispute was eventually settled in 1993 with the school district forced to pay back more than $4.2 million to General Motors. General Motors eventually closed their facility in Comstock in 1996, which resulted in a 10% reduction of the school district's tax base and a loss of jobs in the area.

=== District changes ===
West Elementary was closed in 1979, with students from West divided up between North, East, and Green Meadow. The West Elementary building was sold to Kalamazoo Christian School in 1983 where it operated as a private Christian elementary until 2009. The building is now home to a Childhood Development Center.

Voters in 1992 passed a bond to construct a new 750 seat auditorium adjacent to Comstock High School.

Gull Road Elementary was closed in 2003 and students from this school were divided between North and East Elementary. The Gull Road School building was remodeled in 2004 with the alternative high school and the district administrative offices relocating into the building from the old central school building on 26th street. The alternative high school was renamed Comstock Compass High School in 2008.

The old central school was permanently closed in 2005 after serving the district for more than 80 years. It currently sits vacant waiting its fate.

East Elementary was reconfigured as a 4–5 grade intermediate school in 2006 with North and Green Meadow Elementary Schools serving students in grades Pre-K to 3rd grade.

Voters approved a two-year sinking fund in 2007 to raise $1.3M for the construction of a new 3,500 seat football stadium to replace the old stadium built in 1966 next to Comstock High School.

In 2013, the Comstock Board of Education approved the creation of a STEM Academy. The Academy was created in the East Elementary building, becoming the first K – 8th grade STEM Academy in Kalamazoo County. With the creation of the STEM Academy, North and Green Meadow Elementary buildings were reconfigured as Pre-K – 4th grade and Northeast Middle School was reconfigured for grades 5 – 8th.

In 2019, Green Meadow and North Elementary School were combined and renamed Comstock Elementary School, and moved to where North East Middle School's building was. North Elementary School's building was revised to house what is now Comstock Middle School. Green Meadow Elementary school became Comstock Early Learning Academy that offers STEM and Chinese Immersion preschools, and a day care. This became effective starting the 2019–2020 school year.

== Schools ==
Schools in Comstock Public Schools district
School	Address	Notes
Comstock High School	2107 North 26th Street, Kalamazoo	Grades 9–12.
Comstock Compass High School	3010 Gull Road, Kalamazoo	Grades 9–12. Alternative high school.
Comstock Middle School	3100 N. 26th Street, Kalamazoo	Grades 6–8
Comstock Elementary School	1423 North 28th Street, Kalamazoo	Grades PreK–5
Comstock Early Learning Academy	6171 East MN Avenue, Kalamazoo	Preschool and early childhood programs.
Comstock STEM Academy School	175 Hunt Street, Kalamazoo	Grades K–8
Comstock Virtual Academy	3010 Gull Road, Kalamazoo	Grades K–12. Online school
