= National Institute of Aerospace =

Aerospace research institute in the United States

The National Institute of Aerospace (NIA) is a non-profit research and graduate education institute headquartered in Hampton, Virginia, near NASA's Langley Research Center.

NIA was formed in 2002 by a consortium of research universities. NIA performs research in a broad range of disciplines including space exploration, systems engineering, nanoscale materials science, flight systems, aerodynamics, air traffic management, aviation safety, planetary and space science, and global climate change.

NIA is headed by Dr. Douglas O. Stanley, who was named interim to the post of president and executive director in July 2012. He succeeded Dr. Robert Lindberg, who became the first President and executive director in October 2003.

== Member Institutions ==
- American Institute of Aeronautics and Astronautics (AIAA) Foundation
- Georgia Institute of Technology
- Hampton University
- North Carolina Agricultural and Technical State University
- North Carolina State University
- University of Maryland
- Virginia Polytechnic Institute and State University
- University of Virginia

Affiliates

- The College of William & Mary
- Old Dominion University

== Research projects ==
About 50 full-time researchers are working on projects at NIA.

NIA conducts a broad range of scientific and engineering research sponsored by NASA, other government agencies and the aerospace industry. This work is performed by resident scientists and engineers, faculty, students and consultants in principal areas of investigation to include space exploration, systems engineering, materials science, flight systems, aerodynamics, air traffic management, aviation safety, planetary and space science, and global climate change.

Research programs, led by faculty in residence at NIA, serve as the core of the Institute's academic research program. Through NIA's University Research Program, faculty and students at NIA member universities collaborate with NASA research leaders in fundamental investigations in aerospace, mechanical, electrical, and systems engineering; materials science; applied mathematics, meteorology and other related fields.

NIA also collaborate with other research institutions worldwide, including universities, government laboratories, industry and other non-profit institutes to accomplish its research objectives. NIA conducts applied research with and for the aerospace industry. Through NIA, industrial partners can gain access to LaRC personnel, facilities and intellectual property.

Research projects include:

- Boron nitride nano tubes (BNNT) research and development for aerospace and public safety applications. In collaboration with NASA Langley, and the Thomas Jefferson National Accelerator Facility, NIA has developed a neutron shielding material using boron-containing nanomaterials, which include boron nanoparticles, boron nitride nanotubes (BNNTs), and boron nitride nano-platelets, as well as the polymer composites thereof. This is proposed for advanced radiation shielding and for shielding against high kinetic energy penetrators (i.e. bulletproof vests, protection against micrometeoroids, etc.)
- Field research in the Republic of Tyva in Siberia to validate satellite studies that show longer periods of drought have strengthened the intensity of fires. Amber Soja, NIA Senior Research Scientist based at NASA's Langley Researcher Center, conducted research that has shown that these more destructive fires have started to impair the growth of pine-dominated forests after fires and are causing some pine forest areas to transition to steppe that stores far less carbon from the atmosphere. Likewise, the research shows that the burns cause more destruction when they occur. According to Soja, in other areas where precipitation is limited to begin with, such as the savannas of Australia, longer droughts might actually reduce the number of wildfires because less vegetation would be available to burn.

== Education ==
NIA's graduate program offers M.S. and Ph.D. degrees in the fields of aerospace engineering, mechanical engineering, engineering mechanics, engineering physics, materials science and engineering, electrical engineering, ocean engineering and systems engineering. Degrees are issued through its university partners: Georgia Tech, Hampton University, North Carolina A&T State University, North Carolina State University, the University of Maryland, the University of Virginia, Virginia Tech, Old Dominion University, and the College of William & Mary. Classes are offered on site and through distance education to about 40 graduate students in residence. (Students in residence at NIA are considered in residence at their home university.) NIA also provides Langley Research Center employees the opportunity to pursue a PhD while working.

The faculty comprises Langley Professors who share their time between NIA and their home schools:

- Dr. Mool C. Gupta, University of Virginia
- Dr. James Hubbard, Jr., University of Maryland
- Dr. Christopher Fuller, Virginia Tech
- Dr. William Edmonson, North Carolina A&T State University
- Dr. Fuh-Gwo Yuan, North Carolina State University
- Dr. Alan Wilhite, Georgia Institute of Technology

== NIA Research and Innovation Laboratories ==
The NIA Research and Innovation Laboratories opened in early 2012. The building, located at 1100 Exploration Way in Hampton, Virginia consists of a 14-laboratory, 60,000-square-foot building that houses research and development facilities including a wind tunnel, an unmanned aerial vehicles structures lab and a boron nanotube development lab, among other facilities. The new facility also host the Peninsula Technology Incubator (PTI), a subsidiary of NIA, which encourages entrepreneurship.

== See also ==
- NASA RealWorld-InWorld Engineering Design Challenge
- National Aeronautics and Space Administration
