= Comstock Compass High School =

Location
- 3010 Gull Rd; Kalamazoo, Michigan 49048; United States
- Coordinates: 42.3132°N 85.5417°W

Information
- School type: Public, Urban
- Established: 1979
- School district: Comstock Public School District
- Dean: Roderick Carson (as of 2011)
- Principal: Jay Birchmeier (as of 2011)
- Age range: 16-19 and adult program
- Enrollment: 270 (2022–2023)
- Nickname: Colts
- Website: comstock.ss7.sharpschool.com/Schools/compass

Comstock Compass High School is an alternative high school in the Comstock Public School District in Kalamazoo, Michigan designed for non-traditional students who have struggled in traditional high school programs. As of 2011 the school had a staff of eight teachers and an enrollment of 210 high school students and 70 adult education students.

In 2009, Compass adopted the Michigan Merit Curriculum, which requires students pass a core of classes which includes Algebra 2, Physics, and Chemistry; students need 19 total credits to graduate. After the 2009-2010 school year, the school did not meet Adequate Yearly Progress standards for the state of Michigan.

Compass offers an online curriculum as well as a dual enrollment program that allows high school students to receive college credit from Kalamazoo Valley Community College. Additionally, it offers a General Educational Development (GED) program and a Certified Nursing Assistant (CNA) training program.
