= STEM.org =

American multinational education company

- Type: Private
- Founded: June 04, 2001, Henry Ford Estate
- Founder: Andrew B. Raupp
- Headquarters: Southfield, Michigan, United States
- Services: Evaluation, Research, Education
- Website: STEM.org

STEM.org aka STEM.org Educational Research is a privately held, American company headquartered in Southfield, Michigan. It conducts STEM (Science, Technology, Engineering & Mathematics) research and credentialing services.

== History ==
STEM.org was initiated from a community outreach project in southwest Detroit, by Andrew B. Raupp in 2001. The organization has expanded its mission beyond initial activities it referred to as project “Initiative Science", establishing a global presence in over 80 countries. Notably, it provided framework for the 2005 STEM Congressional Caucus at the request of Congressman Vern Ehlers.

STEM.org Educational Research is recognized for its detailed and comprehensive contributions to the field of STEM education. Its research has been cited by institutions such as the Smithsonian Science Education Center, reflecting its influence on contemporary STEM education discourse. STEM.org emphasizes the linguistics of STEM, distinguishing the educational framework from its individual disciplines. It also provides resources to help stakeholders craft localized and adaptable definitions of STEM education, aligning with community-specific needs and contexts.

== Research ==
STEM.org developed a global quality assurance protocol focused on STEM education. It leverages blockchain technology to secure the credentials it issues, which are denoted as 'STEM Trustmarks,’ by securing each achievement on the Bitcoin distributed ledger for enhanced authenticity and trust.

The organization has carried out a five-year study concerning K-12 STEM schools, using a proprietary regression analysis, which was featured on the cover on the Newsweek. The research activities extend into the development of a quality assurance assessment framework, applicable to a wide array of stakeholders within STEM including individuals, educational programs, publishers, products and students. This is part of its commitment to decentralize STEM education, introducing distinct classifications like STEM-accredited (for schools), STEM-certified (for instructors), STEM-reviewed (for publishers), STEM-authenticated (for products) and STEM-endorsed (for students).

== Selected articles ==
- A STEM state of mind: No magic kit or subscription required
- Competition versus collaboration in STEM education
- How Advancements In AI Could Radically Change The Way Children Learn In The Classroom
- Insights Into Early STEM Learning
- The Rise Of The STEM Toy
- Ethics in STEM Education: Going Beyond the Classroom
- "Know Thyself": A Socratic Approach to Modern STEM Education
- Safeguarding Ideas In The Age Of Digital Censorship: Lessons From The Gutenberg Revolution
- Beyond the "Fourth Industrial Revolution": Why We Must Invest in STEM Education
