= Science, technology, engineering, and mathematics =

Umbrella term for scientific and technical disciplines

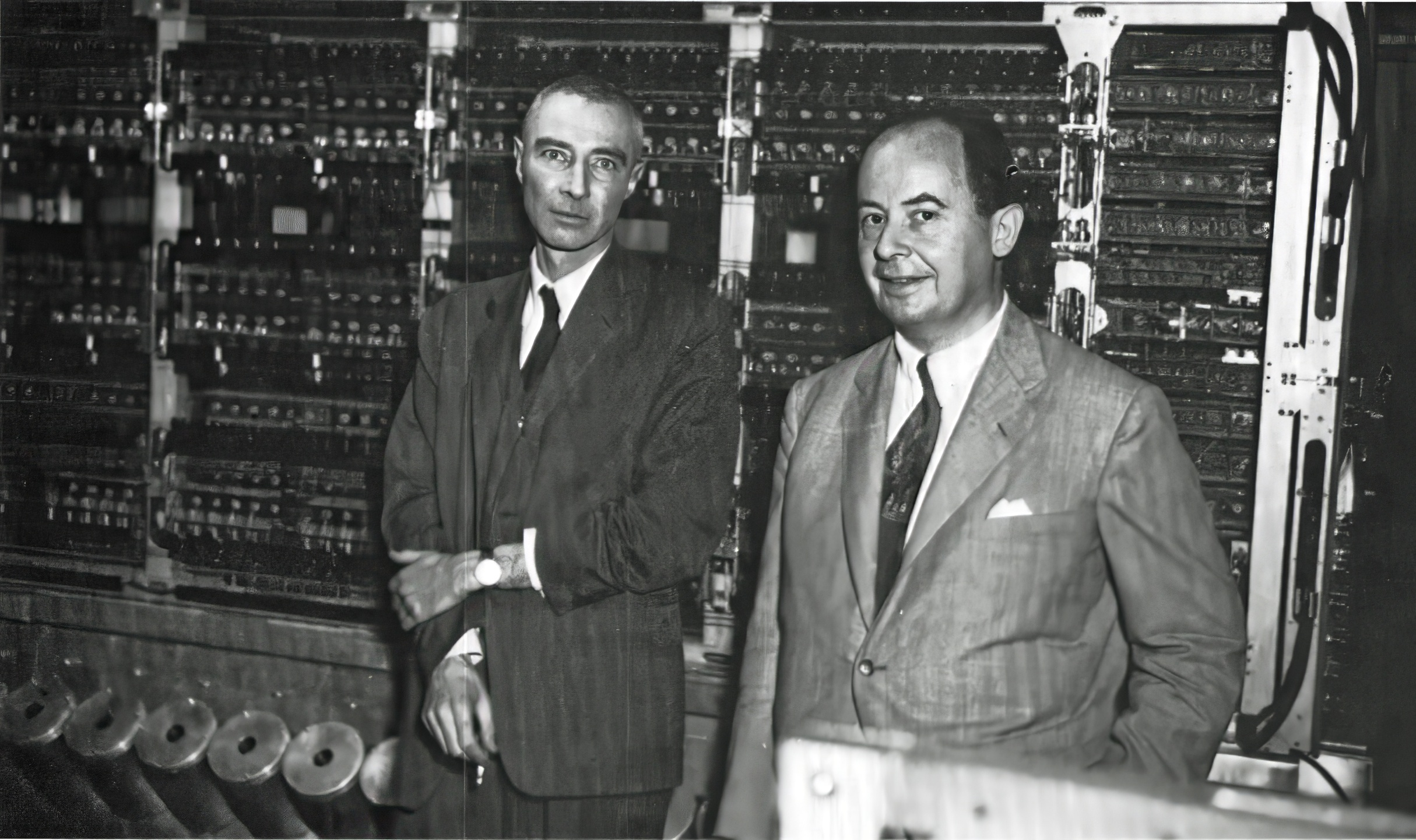
Physicist J. Robert Oppenheimer (left) and mathematician John von Neumann in front of an early electronic computer built at the Institute for Advanced Study, Princeton, New Jersey, United States (1951)

Science, technology, engineering, and mathematics (STEM) is an umbrella term used to group together the related technical disciplines of science, technology, engineering, and mathematics. It represents a broad and interconnected set of fields that are crucial for innovation and technological advancement. These disciplines are often grouped together because they share a common emphasis on critical thinking, problem-solving, and analytical skills. The term is typically used in the context of education policy or curriculum choices in schools. It has implications for workforce development, national security concerns (as a shortage of STEM-educated citizens can reduce effectiveness in this area), and immigration policy, with regard to admitting foreign students and tech workers.

There is no universal agreement on which disciplines are included in STEM; in particular, whether or not the science in STEM includes social sciences, such as psychology, sociology, economics, and political science. In the United States, these are typically included by the National Science Foundation (NSF), the Department of Labor's O*Net online database for job seekers, and the Department of Homeland Security. In the United Kingdom, the social sciences are categorized separately and are instead grouped with humanities and arts to form another counterpart acronym HASS (humanities, arts, and social sciences), rebranded in 2020 as SHAPE (social sciences, humanities and the arts for people and the economy). Some sources also use HEAL (health, education, administration, and literacy) as a counterpart to STEM.

== Terminology ==
=== History ===
In the early 1990s, the acronym STEM was used by a variety of educators. Beverly P. Schwartz developed a STEM mentoring program in the Capital District of New York State and was using the acronym as early as November 1991. Jane Silverstein, Founder of the STEM Academy at John F. Kennedy High School (Patterson, New Jersey) used the term "STEM" in the mid-1990s and claims to have created the first "STEM" curriculum. Charles E. Vela was the founder and director of the Center for the Advancement of Hispanics in Science and Engineering Education (CAHSEE) and started a summer program for talented under-represented students in the Washington, D.C. area called the STEM Institute. Based on the program's recognized success and his expertise in STEM education, Charles Vela was asked to serve on numerous NSF and Congressional panels in science, mathematics, and engineering education. Previously referred to as SMET by the NSF, it is through this manner that NSF was first introduced to the acronym STEM. One of the first NSF projects to use the acronym was STEMTEC, the Science, Technology, Engineering, and Math Teacher Education Collaborative at the University of Massachusetts Amherst, which was founded in 1998. In 2001, at the urging of Dr. Peter Faletra, the Director of Workforce Development for Teachers and Scientists at the Office of Science, the acronym was adopted by Rita Colwell and other science administrators in the National Science Foundation (NSF). The Office of Science was also an early adopter of the STEM acronym.

=== Other variations ===
- eSTEM (environmental STEM)
- GEMS (girls in engineering, math, and science); used for programs to encourage women to enter these fields.
- MINT (mathematics, informatics, natural sciences, and technology)
- SHTEAM (science, humanities, technology, engineering, arts, and mathematics)
- SMET (science, mathematics, engineering, and technology); previous name
- STEAM (science, technology, engineering, arts, and mathematics)
  - STEAM (science, technology, engineering, agriculture, and mathematics); add agriculture
  - STEAM (science, technology, engineering, and applied mathematics); has more focus on applied mathematics
- STEEM (science, technology, engineering, economics, and mathematics); adds economics as a field
- STEMIE (science, technology, engineering, mathematics, invention, and entrepreneurship); adds inventing and entrepreneurship as a means to apply STEM to real-world problem-solving and markets.
- STEMM (science, technology, engineering, mathematics, and medicine)
- STM (scientific, technical, and mathematics or science, technology, and medicine)
- STREAM (science, technology, robotics, engineering, arts, and mathematics); adds robotics and arts as fields
  - STREAM (science, technology, reading, engineering, arts, and mathematics); adds reading and arts
  - STREAM (science, technology, recreation, engineering, arts, and mathematics); adds recreation and arts

== Geographic distribution ==

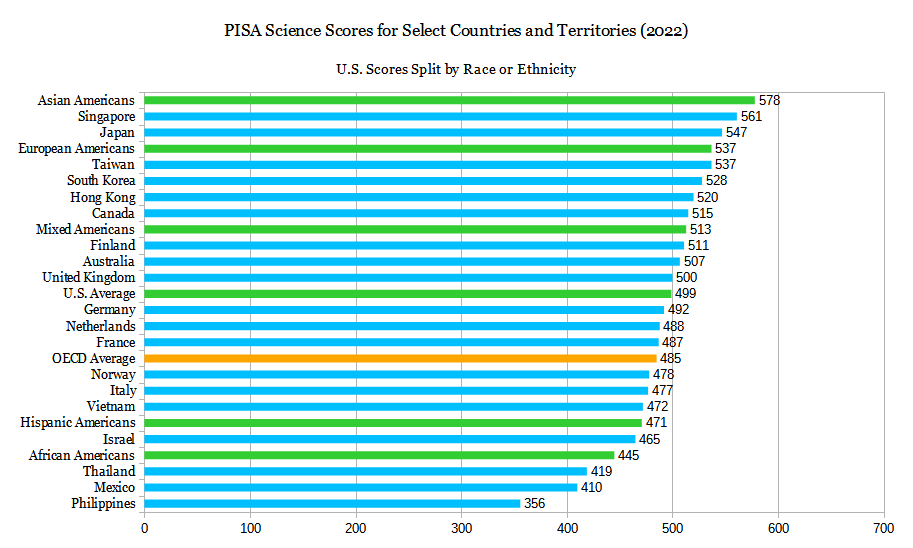

STEM graduates by country (2020)
Rank	Country	Number of STEM grads	Percent of total grads
1	China	3,570,000	41%
2	India	2,550,000	30%
3	United States	820,000	20%
4	Russia	520,000	37%
5	Indonesia	300,000	20%
6	Brazil	238,000	17%
7	Mexico	221,000	26%
8	France	220,000	26%
9	Germany	216,000	36%
10	Iran	211,000	33%
11	Japan	192,000	19%

By the mid-2000s, China surpassed the United States in the number of PhDs awarded and is expected to produce 77,000 PhDs in 2025, compared to 40,000 in the US.

== By country ==
=== Australia ===
The Australian Curriculum, Assessment, and Reporting Authority 2015 report entitled, National STEM School Education Strategy, stated that "A renewed national focus on STEM in school education is critical to ensuring that all young Australians are equipped with the necessary STEM skills and knowledge that they must need to succeed." Its goals were to:

- "Ensure all students finish school with strong foundational knowledge in STEM and related skills"
- "Ensure that students are inspired to take on more challenging STEM subjects"

Events and programs meant to help develop STEM in Australian schools include the Victorian Model Solar Vehicle Challenge, the Maths Challenge (Australian Mathematics Trust), Go Girl Go Global and the Australian Informatics Olympiad.

=== Canada ===
Canada ranks 12th out of 16 peer countries in the percentage of its graduates who studied in STEM programs, with 21.2%, a number higher than the United States, but lower than France, Germany, and Austria. The peer country with the greatest proportion of STEM graduates, Finland, has over 30% of its university graduates coming from science, mathematics, computer science, and engineering programs.

SHAD is an annual Canadian summer enrichment program for high-achieving high school students in July. The program focuses on academic learning, particularly in STEAM fields.

Scouts Canada has taken similar measures to their American counterpart to promote STEM fields to youth. Their STEM program began in 2015.

In 2011 Canadian entrepreneur and philanthropist Seymour Schulich established the Schulich Leader Scholarships, $100 million in $60,000 scholarships for students beginning their university education in a STEM program at 20 institutions across Canada. Each year 40 Canadian students would be selected to receive the award, two at each institution, with the goal of attracting gifted youth into the STEM fields. The program also supplies STEM scholarships to five participating universities in Israel.

=== China ===
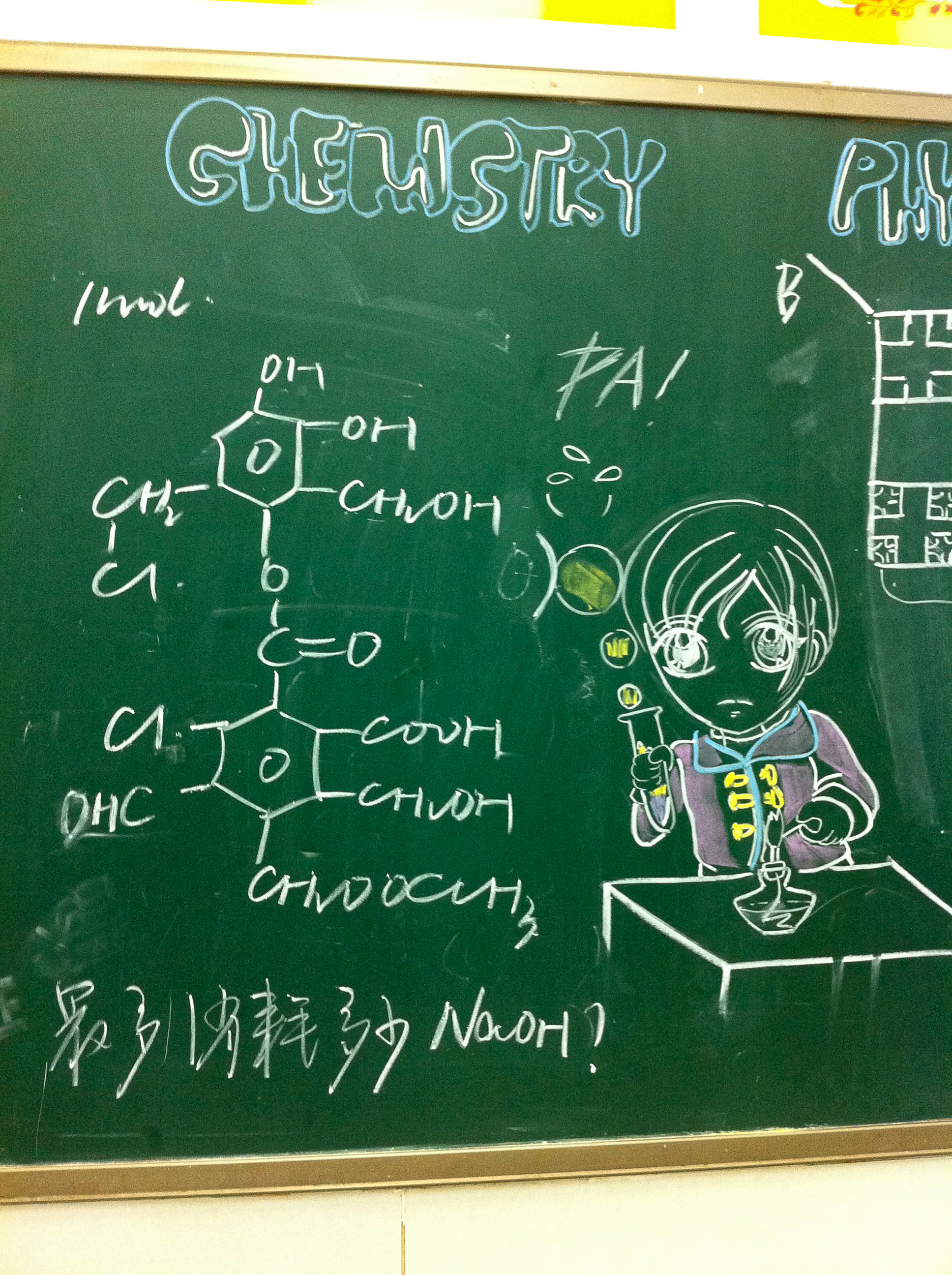
Middle school chemistry on a blackboard in Beijing, China, 2011

To promote STEM in China, the Chinese government issued a guideline in 2016 on national innovation-driven development strategy, "instructing that by 2020, China should become an innovative country; by 2030, it should be at the forefront of innovative countries; and by 2050, it should become a technology innovation power."

"[I]n May 2018, the launching ceremony and press conference for the 2029 Action Plan for China's STEM Education was held in Beijing, China. This plan aims to allow as many students to benefit from STEM education as possible and equip all students with scientific thinking and the ability to innovate." "In response to encouraging policies by the government, schools in both public and private sectors around the country have begun to carry out STEM education programs."

"However, to effectively implement STEM curricula, full-time teachers specializing in STEM education and relevant content to be taught are needed." Currently, "China lacks qualified STEM teachers and a training system is yet to be established."

Several Chinese cities have made programming a mandatory subject for elementary and middle school students. This is the case of the city of Chongqing. However, most students from small and medium-sized cities have not been exposed to the concept of STEM until they enter college.

=== Europe ===
Several European projects have promoted STEM education and careers in Europe. For instance, Scientix is a European cooperation of STEM teachers, education scientists, and policymakers. The SciChallenge project used a social media contest and student-generated content to increase the motivation of pre-university students for STEM education and careers. The Erasmus programme project AutoSTEM used automata to introduce STEM subjects to very young children.

==== Finland ====
The LUMA Center is the leading advocate for STEM-oriented education. Its aim is to promote the instruction and research of natural sciences, mathematics, computer science, and technology across all educational levels in the country. In the native tongue luma stands for "luonnontieteellis-matemaattinen" (lit. adj. "scientific-mathematical"). The short is more or less a direct translation of STEM, with engineering fields included by association. However, unlike STEM, the term is also a portmanteau from lu and ma. To address the decline in interest in learning the areas of science, the Finnish National Board of Education launched the LUMA scientific education development program. The project's main goal was to raise the level of Finnish education and to enhance students' competencies, improve educational practices, and foster interest in science. The initiative led to the establishment of 13 LUMA centers at universities across Finland supervised by LUMA Center.

==== France ====
The name of STEM in France is industrial engineering sciences (sciences industrielles or sciences de l'ingénieur). The STEM organization in France is the association UPSTI.

=== Hong Kong ===
STEM education has not been promoted among the local schools in Hong Kong until recent years. In November 2015, the Education Bureau of Hong Kong released a document titled Promotion of STEM Education, which proposes strategies and recommendations for promoting STEM education.

=== India ===
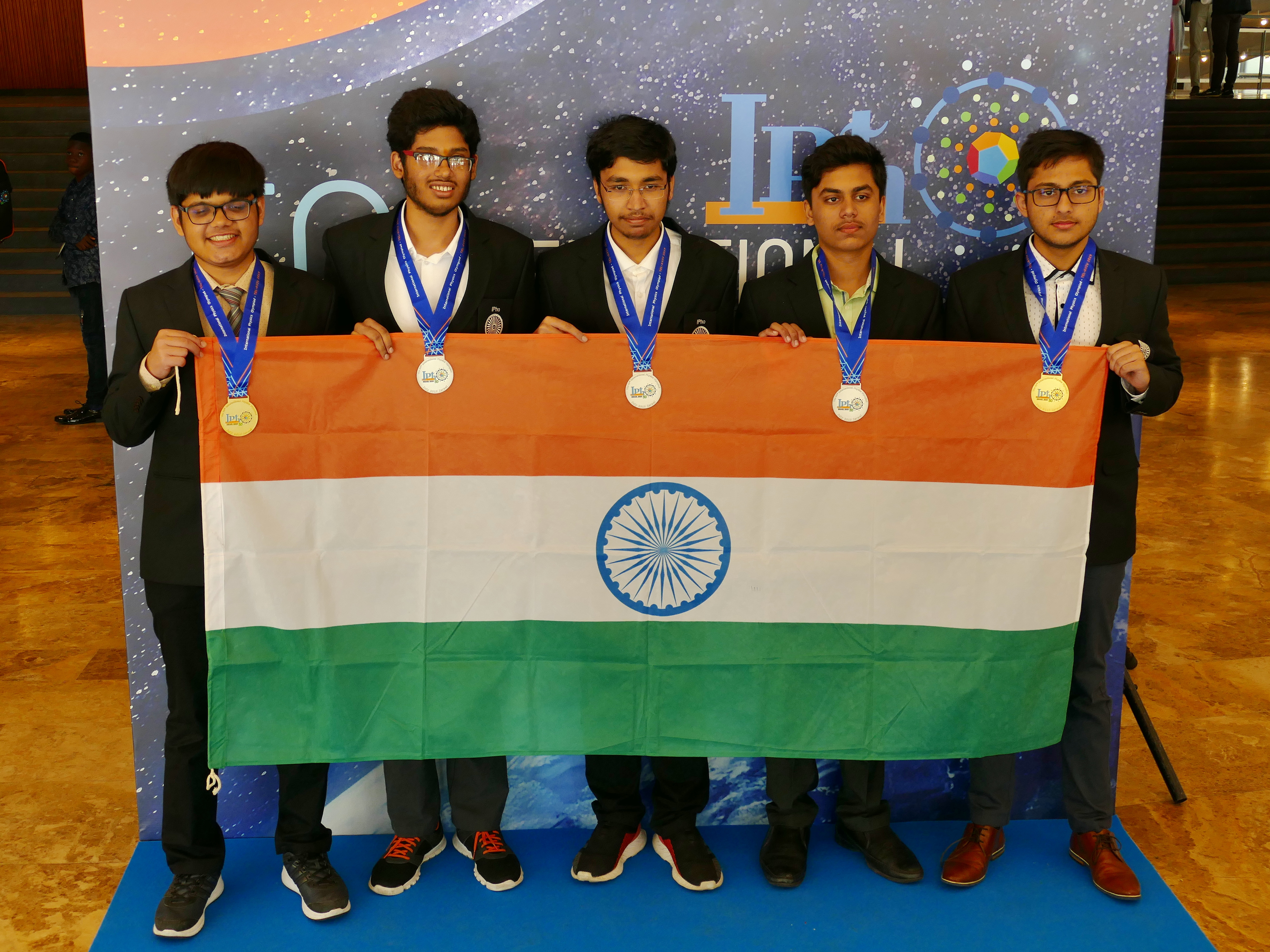
Medalists from Team India at the 2019 International Physics Olympiad

India is next only to China with STEM graduates per population of 1 to 52. The total number of fresh STEM graduates was 2.6 million in 2016. STEM graduates have been contributing to the Indian economy with well-paid salaries locally and abroad for the past two decades. The turnaround of the Indian economy with comfortable foreign exchange reserves is mainly attributed to the skills of its STEM graduates. In India, women make up an impressive 43% of STEM graduates, the highest percentage worldwide. However, they hold only 14% of STEM-related jobs. Additionally, among the 280,000 scientists and engineers working in research and development institutes in the country, women represent a mere 14%

In India, OMOTEC is providing an innovative curriculum based on STEM, and their students are also performing and developing products to solve the new age problems. Two students also won the Microsoft Imagine Cup for developing a non-invasive method to screen for skin cancer using artificial intelligence.

=== Nigeria ===
In Nigeria, the Association of Professional Women Engineers Of Nigeria (APWEN) has involved girls between the ages of 12 and 19 in science-based courses in order for them to pursue science-based courses in higher institutions of learning. The National Science Foundation (NSF) In Nigeria has made conscious efforts to encourage girls to innovate, invent, and build through the "invent it, build it" program sponsored by NNPC.

=== Pakistan ===
STEM subjects are taught in Pakistan as electives in the 9th and 10th grades, culminating in the Matriculation exams. These electives are pure sciences (Physics, Chemistry, Biology), mathematics (Physics, Chemistry, Maths), and computer science (Physics, Chemistry, Computer Science). STEM subjects are also offered as electives in the 11th and 12th grades, more commonly referred to as the first and second years, culminating in Intermediate exams. These electives are: FSc pre-medical (Physics, Chemistry, Biology); FSc pre-engineering (Physics, Chemistry, Maths); and ICS (Physics/Statistics, Computer Science, Maths). These electives are intended to aid students in pursuing STEM-related careers in the future by preparing them for the study of these courses at university.

A STEM education project has been approved by the government to establish STEM labs in public schools. The Ministry of Information Technology and Telecommunication has collaborated with Google to launch Pakistan's first grassroots-level Coding Skills Development Program, based on Google's CS First Program, a global initiative aimed at developing coding skills in children. The program aims to develop applied coding skills through gamification for children ages 9 to 14.

The KPITBs Early Age Programming initiative, established in the province of Khyber Pakhtunkhwa, has been successfully introduced in 225 Elementary and Secondary Schools. Many private organizations are working in Pakistan to introduce STEM education in schools.

=== Philippines ===
In the Philippines, STEM is a two-year program and strand that is used for Senior High School (Grades 11 and 12), assigned by the Department of Education or DepEd. The STEM strand is under the Academic Track, which also includes other strands like ABM (Accountancy, Business and Management), HUMSS (Humanities and Social Sciences), and GAS (General Academic Strand). The purpose of the STEM strand is to educate students in the field of science, technology, engineering, and mathematics, in an interdisciplinary and applied approach, and to give students advanced knowledge and application in the field. After completing the program, the students will earn a Diploma in Science, Technology, Engineering, and Mathematics. In some colleges and universities, they require students applying for STEM degrees (like medicine, engineering, computer studies, etc.) to be a graduate of STEM, if not, they will need to enter a bridging program.

=== Qatar ===
In Qatar, AL-Bairaq is an outreach program to high-school students with a curriculum that focuses on STEM, run by the Center for Advanced Materials (CAM) at Qatar University. Each year around 946 students, from about 40 high schools, participate in AL-Bairaq competitions. AL-Bairaq makes use of project-based learning, encourages students to solve authentic problems, and inquires them to work with each other as a team to build real solutions. Research has so far shown positive results for the program.

=== Singapore ===
STEM is part of the Applied Learning Programme (ALP) that the Singapore Ministry of Education (MOE) has been promoting since 2013, and currently, all secondary schools have such a program. It is expected that by 2023, all primary schools in Singapore will have an ALP. There are no tests or exams for ALPs. The emphasis is for students to learn through experimentation – they try, fail, try, learn from it, and try again. The MOE actively supports schools with ALPs to further enhance and strengthen their capabilities and programs that nurture innovation and creativity.

The Singapore Science Centre established a STEM unit in January 2014, dedicated to igniting students' passion for STEM. To further enrich students' learning experiences, their Industrial Partnership Programme (IPP) creates opportunities for students to get early exposure to real-world STEM industries and careers. Curriculum specialists and STEM educators from the Science Centre will work hand-in-hand with teachers to co-develop STEM lessons, provide training to teachers, and co-teach such lessons to provide students with early exposure and develop their interest in STEM.

=== Thailand ===
In 2017, Thai Education Minister Teerakiat Jareonsettasin said after the 49th Southeast Asia Ministers of Education Organisation (SEAMEO) Council Conference in Jakarta that the meeting approved the establishment of two new SEAMEO regional centers in Thailand. One would be the STEM Education Centre, while the other would be a Sufficient Economy Learning Centre.

Teerakiat said that the Thai government had already allocated Bt250 million over five years for the new STEM center. The center will be the regional institution responsible for STEM education promotion. It will not only set up policies to improve STEM education, but it will also be the center for information and experience sharing among the member countries and education experts. According to him, "This is the first SEAMEO regional center for STEM education, as the existing science education center in Malaysia only focuses on the academic perspective. Our STEM education center will also prioritize the implementation and adaptation of science and technology."

The Institute for the Promotion of Teaching Science and Technology has initiated a STEM Education Network. Its goals are to promote integrated learning activities improve student creativity and application of knowledge, and establish a network of organisations and personnel for the promotion of STEM education in the country.

=== Turkey ===
Turkish STEM Education Task Force (or FeTeMM—Fen Bilimleri, Teknoloji, Mühendislik ve Matematik) is a coalition of academicians and teachers who show an effort to increase the quality of education in STEM fields rather than focussing on increasing the number of STEM graduates.

=== United States ===
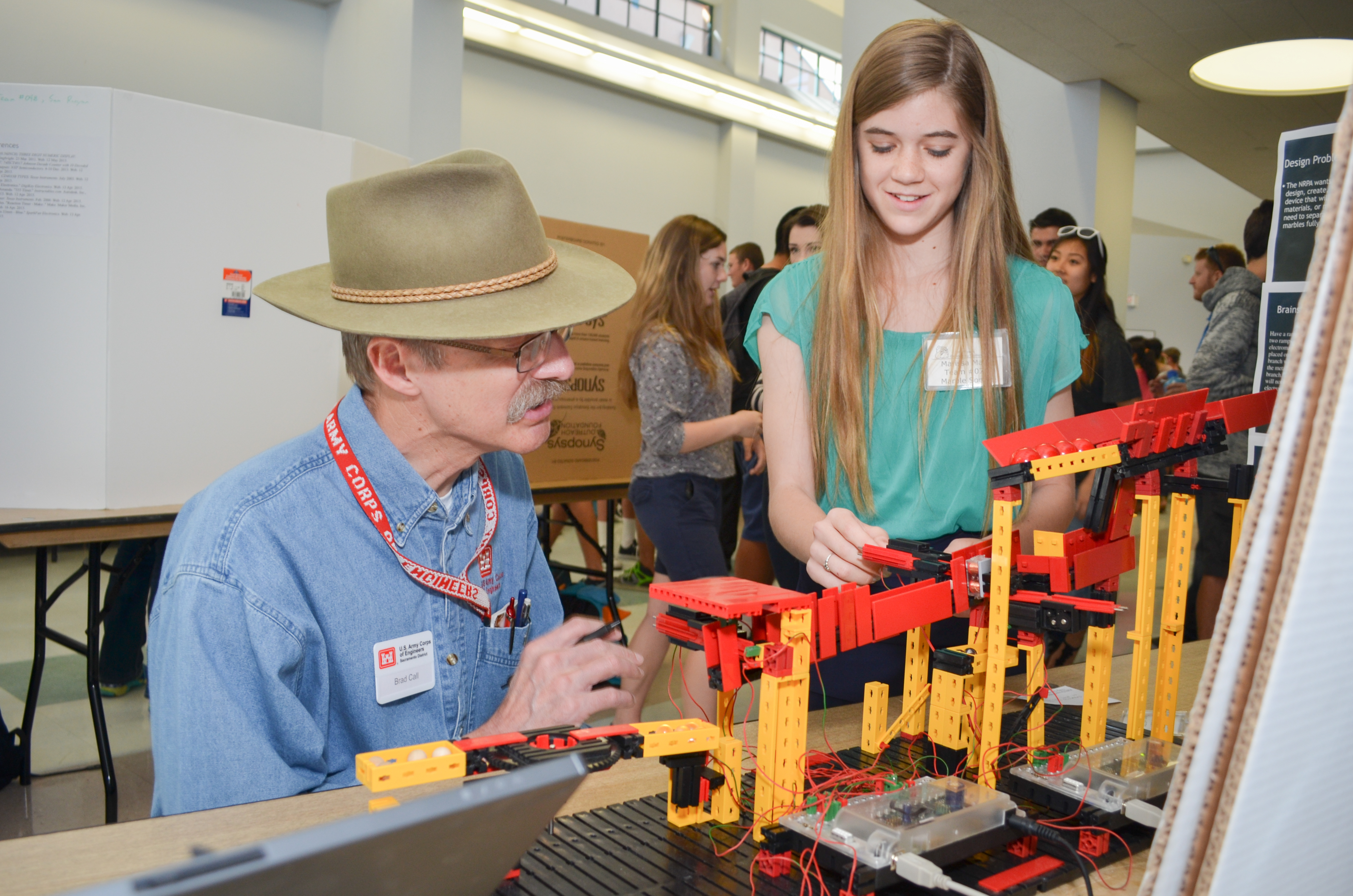
A high school student explains her engineering project to a judge in Sacramento, California, in 2015.

In the United States, the acronym began to be used in education and immigration debates in initiatives to begin to address the perceived lack of qualified candidates for high-tech jobs. It also addresses concern that the subjects are often taught in isolation, instead of as an integrated curriculum. Maintaining a citizenry that is well-versed in the STEM fields is a key portion of the public education agenda of the United States. The acronym has been widely used in the immigration debate regarding access to United States work visas for immigrants who are skilled in these fields. It has also become commonplace in education discussions as a reference to the shortage of skilled workers and inadequate education in these areas. The term tends not to refer to the non-professional and less visible sectors of the fields, such as electronics assembly line work.

==== National Science Foundation ====
Many organizations in the United States follow the guidelines of the National Science Foundation on what constitutes a STEM field. The NSF uses a broad definition of STEM subjects that includes subjects in the fields of chemistry, computer and information technology science, engineering, geoscience, life sciences, mathematical sciences, physics and astronomy, social sciences (anthropology, economics, psychology, and sociology), and STEM education and learning research. The NSF is the only American federal agency whose mission includes support for all fields of fundamental science and engineering, except for medical sciences. Its disciplinary program areas include scholarships, grants, and fellowships in fields such as biological sciences, computer and information science and engineering, education and human resources, engineering, environmental research and education, geoscience, international science and engineering, mathematical and physical sciences, social, behavioral and economic sciences, cyberinfrastructure, and polar programs.

==== Immigration policy ====
Although many organizations in the United States follow the guidelines of the National Science Foundation on what constitutes a STEM field, the United States Department of Homeland Security (DHS) has its own functional definition used for immigration policy. In 2012, DHS or ICE announced an expanded list of STEM-designated degree programs that qualify eligible graduates on student visas for an optional practical training (OPT) extension. Under the OPT program, international students who graduate from colleges and universities in the United States can stay in the country and receive up to twelve months of training through work experience. Students who graduate from a designated STEM degree program can stay for an additional seventeen months on an OPT STEM extension.

As of 2023, the U.S. faces a shortage of high-skilled workers in STEM, and foreign talents must navigate difficult hurdles to immigrate. Meanwhile, some other countries, such as Australia, Canada, and the United Kingdom, have introduced programs to attract talent at the expense of the United States. In the case of China, the United States risks losing its edge over a strategic rival.

==== Education ====
By cultivating an interest in the natural and social sciences in preschool or immediately following school entry, the chances of STEM success in high school can be greatly improved. In his 2012 budget, President Barack Obama renamed and broadened the "Mathematics and Science Partnership (MSP)" to award block grants to states for improving teacher education in those subjects. Calculus AB and Statistics are two of the most popular Advanced Placement (AP) exams, as of 2025.

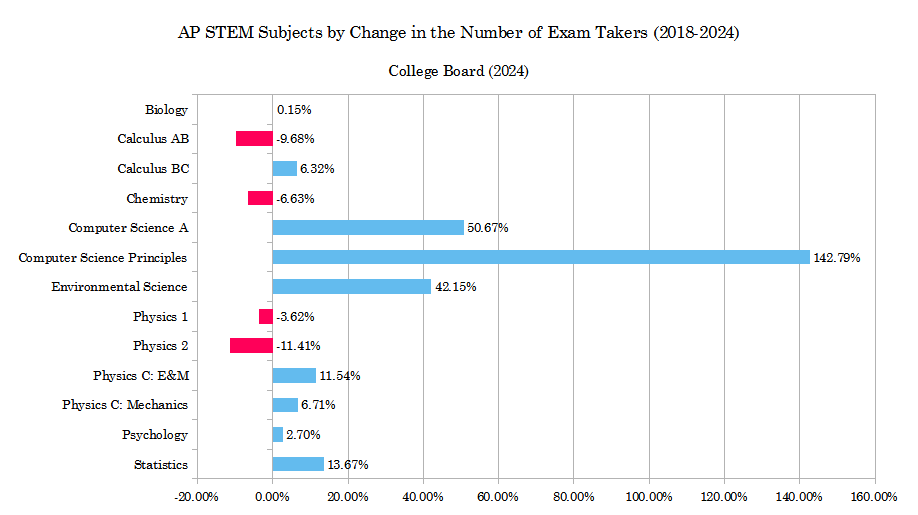
Most AP exams in STEM saw an increase in the number of takers between 2018 and 2024.

Students with the highest standardized test scores commonly pick the STEM subjects as their majors, while those with the lowest were more likely to choose education and agriculture.

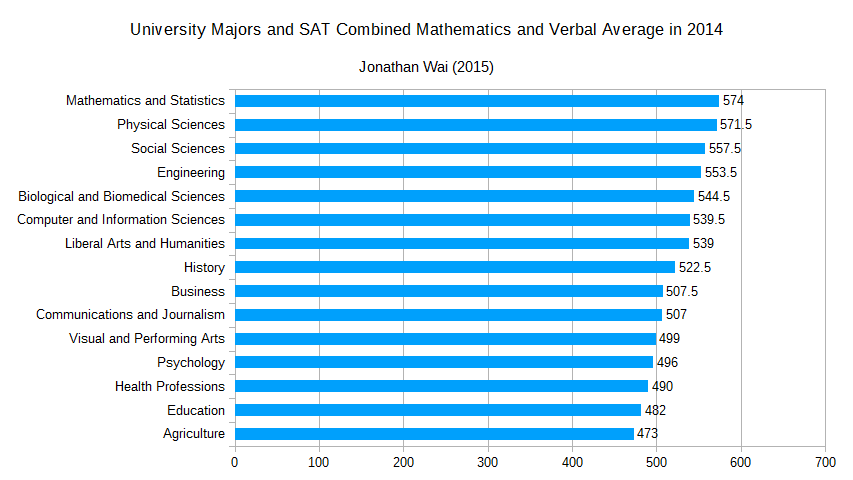

During the 2010s, STEM has grown in popularity at the expense of the liberal arts and humanities.

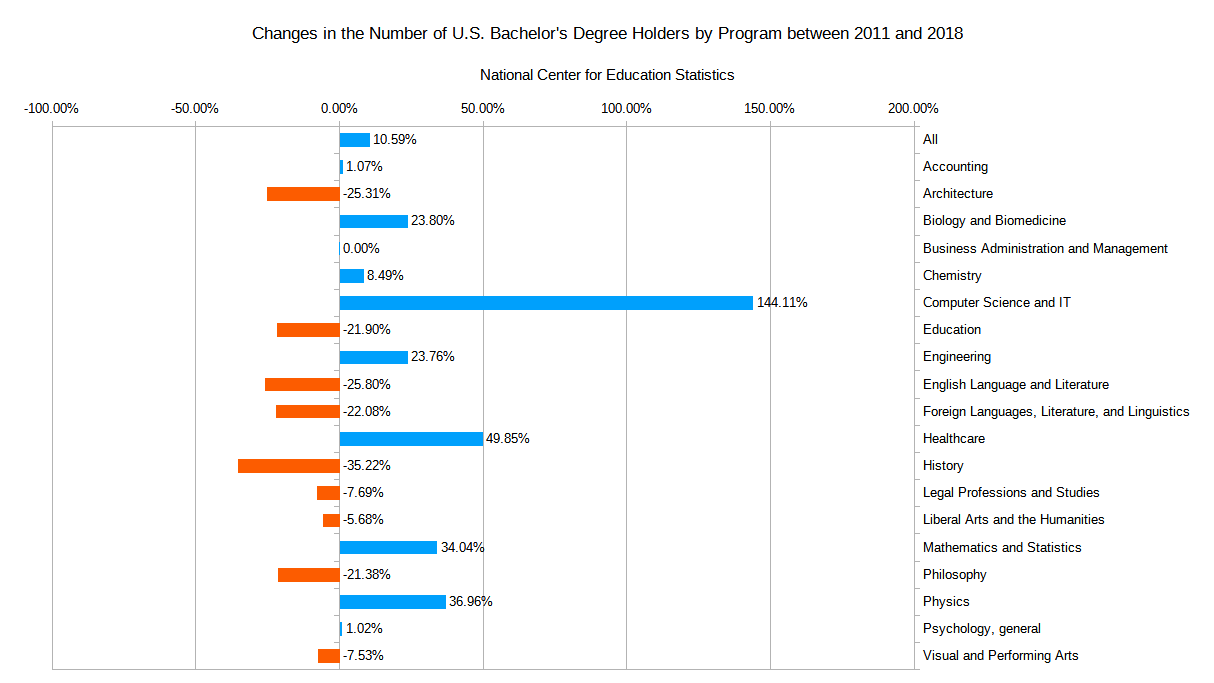
Healthcare and STEM, especially computer science, grew in popularity while the liberal arts and social studies, especially history, have declined due to market forces.

STEM education often uses new technologies such as 3D printers to encourage interest in STEM fields. STEM education can also leverage the combination of new technologies, such as photovoltaics and environmental sensors, with old technologies such as composting systems and irrigation within land lab environments.

In 2006, the United States National Academies expressed their concern about the declining state of STEM education in the United States. Its Committee on Science, Engineering, and Public Policy developed a list of 10 actions. Their top three recommendations were to:

- Increase America's talent pool by improving K–12 science and mathematics education
- Strengthen the skills of teachers through additional training in science, mathematics, and technology
- Enlarge the pipeline of students prepared to enter college and graduate with STEM degrees

The National Aeronautics and Space Administration has also implemented programs and curricula to advance STEM education to replenish the pool of scientists, engineers, and mathematicians who will lead space exploration in the 21st century.

Individual states, such as California, have run pilot after-school STEM programs to identify the most promising practices and how to implement them to increase the likelihood of student success. Another state to invest in STEM education is Florida, where Florida Polytechnic University, Florida's first public university for engineering and technology dedicated to science, technology, engineering, and mathematics (STEM), was established. During school, STEM programs have been established for many districts throughout the U.S. Some states include New Jersey, Arizona, Virginia, North Carolina, Texas, and Ohio.

Continuing STEM education has expanded to the post-secondary level through masters programs such as the University of Maryland's STEM Program as well as the University of Cincinnati.

==== Racial gap in STEM fields ====
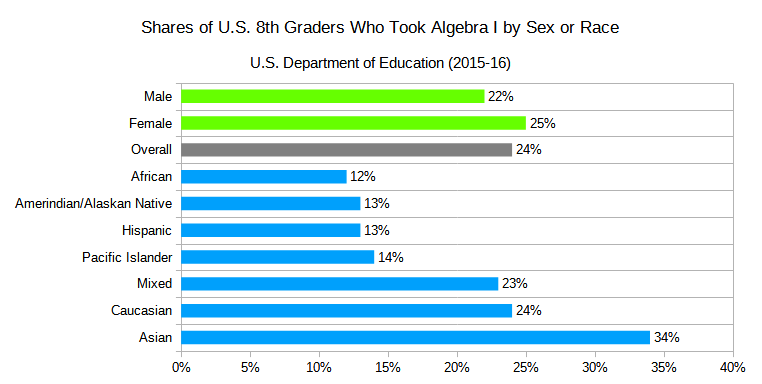
Significant race or sex differences exist in the completion of Algebra I.

In the United States, the National Science Foundation found that the average science score on the 2011 National Assessment of Educational Progress was lower for black and Hispanic students than for white, Asian, and Pacific Islanders. In 2011, eleven percent of the U.S. workforce was black, while only six percent of STEM workers were black. Though STEM in the U.S. has typically been dominated by white males, there have been considerable efforts to create initiatives to make STEM a more racially and gender-diverse field. Some evidence suggests that all students, including black and Hispanic students, have a better chance of earning a STEM degree if they attend a college or university at which their entering academic credentials are at least as high as the average student's.

==== Gender gaps in STEM ====
Although women make up 47% of the workforce in the U.S., they hold only 24% of STEM jobs. Research suggests that exposing girls to female inventors at a young age has the potential to reduce the gender gap in technical STEM fields by half. Campaigns from organizations like the National Inventors Hall of Fame aimed to achieve a 50/50 gender balance in their youth STEM programs by 2020.

==== Intersectionality in STEM ====
STEM fields have been recognized as areas where underrepresentation and exclusion of marginalized groups are prevalent. STEM poses unique challenges related to intersectionality due to rigid norms and stereotypes, both in higher education and professional settings. These norms often prioritize objectivity and meritocracy while overlooking structural inequities, creating environments where individuals with intersecting marginalized identities face compounded barriers.

For instance, individuals from traditionally underrepresented groups may experience a phenomenon known as "chilly climates" which refers to incidents of sexism, isolation, and pressure to prove themselves to peers and high level academics. For minority populations in STEM, loneliness is experienced due to lack of belonging and social isolation.

==== American Competitiveness Initiative ====
In the State of the Union Address on January 31, 2006, President George W. Bush announced the American Competitiveness Initiative. Bush proposed the initiative to address shortfalls in federal government support of educational development and progress at all academic levels in the STEM fields. In detail, the initiative called for significant increases in federal funding for advanced R&D programs (including a doubling of federal funding support for advanced research in the physical sciences through DOE) and an increase in U.S. higher education graduates within STEM disciplines.

The NASA Means Business competition, sponsored by the Texas Space Grant Consortium, furthers that goal. College students compete to develop promotional plans to encourage students in middle and high school to study STEM subjects and to inspire professors in STEM fields to involve their students in outreach activities that support STEM education.

The National Science Foundation has numerous programs in STEM education, including some for K–12 students such as the ITEST Program that supports The Global Challenge Award ITEST Program. STEM programs have been implemented in some Arizona schools. They implement higher cognitive skills for students and enable them to inquire and use techniques used by professionals in the STEM fields.

Project Lead The Way (PLTW) is a provider of STEM education curricular programs to middle and high schools in the United States. Programs include a high school engineering curriculum called Pathway To Engineering, a high school biomedical sciences program, and a middle school engineering and technology program called Gateway To Technology. PLTW programs have been endorsed by President Barack Obama and United States Secretary of Education Arne Duncan as well as various state, national, and business leaders.

==== STEM Education Coalition ====
The Science, Technology, Engineering, and Mathematics (STEM) Education Coalition works to support STEM programs for teachers and students at the U.S. Department of Education, the National Science Foundation, and other agencies that offer STEM-related programs. Activity of the STEM Coalition seems to have slowed since September 2008.

Founded in 2001, STEM.org Educational Research™ is a private organization that operates a global trustmark framework for STEM education. Its credentialing system, which includes distinctions for educational programs, products, and professionals, is used to verify STEM authenticity and quality in over 80 countries.

==== Scouting ====
In 2012, the Boy Scouts of America began handing out awards, titled NOVA and SUPERNOVA, for completing specific requirements appropriate to the scouts' program level in each of the four main STEM areas. The Girl Scouts of the USA has similarly incorporated STEM into their program through the introduction of merit badges such as "Naturalist" and "Digital Art".

SAE is an international organization, and provider specializing in supporting education, award, and scholarship programs for STEM matters, from pre-K to college degrees. It also promotes scientific and technological innovation.

==== Department of Defense programs ====
eCybermission is a free, web-based science, mathematics, and technology competition for students in grades six through nine sponsored by the U.S. Army. Each webinar is focused on a different step of the scientific method and is presented by an experienced eCybermission CyberGuide. CyberGuides are military and civilian volunteers with a strong background in STEM and STEM education, who can provide insight into science, technology, engineering, and mathematics to students and team advisers.

STARBASE is an educational program, sponsored by the Office of the Assistant Secretary of Defense for Reserve Affairs. Students interact with military personnel to explore careers and make connections with the "real world". The program provides students with 20–25 hours of experience at the National Guard, Navy, Marines, Air Force Reserve, and Air Force bases across the nation.

SeaPerch is an underwater robotics program that trains teachers to teach their students how to build an underwater remotely operated vehicle (ROV) in an in-school or out-of-school setting. Students build the ROV from a kit composed of low-cost, easily accessible parts, following a curriculum that teaches basic engineering and science concepts with a marine engineering theme.

==== NASA ====
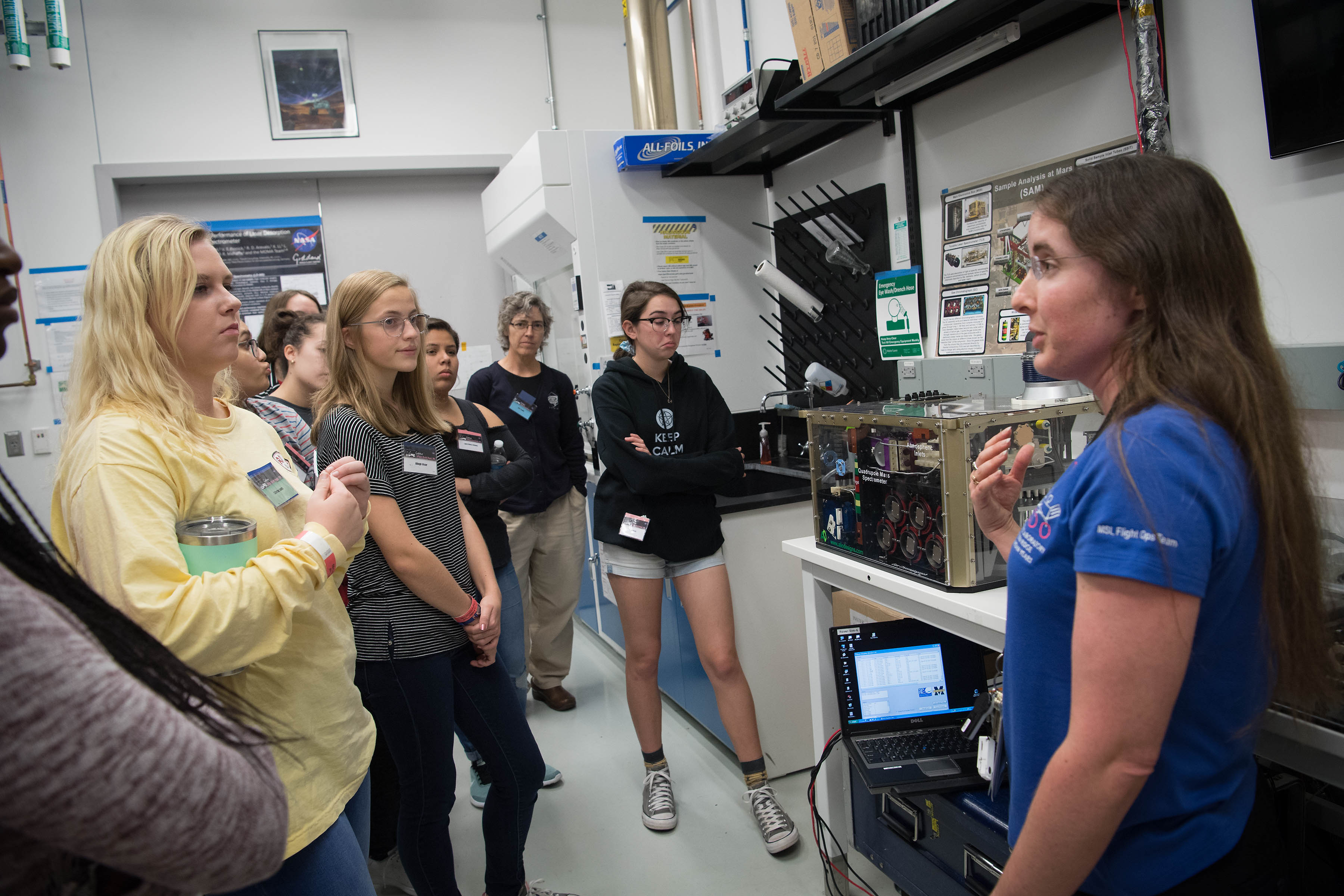
STEM Girls' Night In at the NASA's Goddard Space Flight Center, Greenbelt, Maryland (2018)

NASAStem is a program of the U.S. space agency NASA to increase diversity within its ranks, including age, disability, and gender as well as race/ethnicity.

==== Legislation ====
The America COMPETES Act (P.L. 110–69) became law on August 9, 2007. It is intended to increase the nation's investment in science and engineering research and in STEM education from kindergarten to graduate school and postdoctoral education. The act authorizes funding increases for the National Science Foundation, National Institute of Standards and Technology laboratories, and the Department of Energy (DOE) Office of Science over FY2008–FY2010. Robert Gabrys, Director of Education at NASA's Goddard Space Flight Center, articulated success as increased student achievement, early expression of student interest in STEM subjects, and student preparedness to enter the workforce.

==== Jobs ====
In November 2012 the White House announcement before the congressional vote on the STEM Jobs Act put President Obama in opposition to many of the Silicon Valley firms and executives who bankrolled his re-election campaign. The Department of Labor identified 14 sectors that are "projected to add substantial numbers of new jobs to the economy or affect the growth of other industries or are being transformed by technology and innovation requiring new sets of skills for workers." The identified sectors were as follows: advanced manufacturing, Automotive, construction, financial services, geospatial technology, homeland security, information technology, Transportation, Aerospace, Biotechnology, energy, healthcare, hospitality, and retail.

The Department of Commerce notes STEM fields careers are some of the best-paying and have the greatest potential for job growth in the early 21st century. The report also notes that STEM workers play a key role in the sustained growth and stability of the U.S. economy, and training in STEM fields generally results in higher wages, whether or not they work in a STEM field.

In 2015, there were around 9.0 million STEM jobs in the United States, representing 6.1% of American employment. STEM jobs were increasing by around 9% percent per year. Brookings Institution found that the demand for competent technology graduates will surpass the number of capable applicants by at least one million individuals.

According to Pew Research Center, a typical STEM worker earns two-thirds more than those employed in other fields.

==== Recent progress ====
According to the 2014 US census "74 percent of those who have a bachelor's degree in science, technology, engineering and math — commonly referred to as STEM — are not employed in STEM occupations."

In September 2017, several large American technology firms collectively pledged to donate $300 million for computer science education in the U.S.

PEW findings revealed in 2018 that Americans identified several issues that hound STEM education which included unconcerned parents, disinterested students, obsolete curriculum materials, and too much focus on state parameters. 57 percent of survey respondents pointed out that one main problem of STEM is the lack of students' concentration in learning.

The recent National Assessment of Educational Progress (NAEP) report card made public technology as well as engineering literacy scores which determines whether students can apply technology and engineering proficiency to real-life scenarios. The report showed a gap of 28 points between low-income students and their high-income counterparts. The same report also indicated a 38-point difference between white and black students.

The Smithsonian Science Education Center (SSEC) announced the release of a five-year strategic plan by the Committee on STEM Education of the National Science and Technology Council on December 4, 2018. The plan is entitled "Charting a Course for Success: America's Strategy for STEM Education." The objective is to propose a federal strategy anchored on a vision for the future so that all Americans are given permanent access to premium-quality education in Science, Technology, Engineering, and Mathematics. In the end, the United States can emerge as a world leader in STEM mastery, employment, and innovation. The goals of this plan are building foundations for STEM literacy; enhancing diversity, equality, and inclusion in STEM; and preparing the STEM workforce for the future.

The 2019 fiscal budget proposal of the White House supported the funding plan in President Donald Trump's Memorandum on STEM Education which allocated around $200 million (grant funding) for STEM education every year. This budget also supports STEM through a grant program worth $20 million for career as well as technical education programs.

==== Events and programs to help develop STEM in US schools ====
- FIRST Tech Challenge
- VEX Robotics Competitions
- FIRST Robotics Competition

=== Vietnam ===
In Vietnam, beginning in 2012 many private education organizations have STEM education initiatives.

In 2015, the Ministry of Science and Technology and Liên minh STEM organized the first National STEM Day, followed by many similar events across the country.

in 2015, the Ministry of Education and Training included STEM as an area that needed to be encouraged in the national school year program.

In May 2017, the Prime Minister signed a Directive No. 16 stating: "Dramatically change the policies, contents, education and vocational training methods to create a human resource capable of receiving new production technology trends, with a focus on promoting training in science, technology, engineering and mathematics (STEM), foreign languages, information technology in general education; " and asking "Ministry of Education and Training (to): Promote the deployment of science, technology, engineering and mathematics (STEM) education in general education program; Pilot organize in some high schools from 2017 to 2018.

=== Zimbawe ===
The gender gap in Zimbabwe's STEM fields is significant, with only 28.79% of women holding STEM degrees compared to 71.21% of men.

== Women ==
Share of female STEM graduates

Women constitute 47% of the U.S. workforce and perform 24% of STEM-related jobs. In the UK women perform 13% of STEM-related jobs (2014). In the U.S. women with STEM degrees are more likely to work in education or healthcare rather than STEM fields compared with their male counterparts.

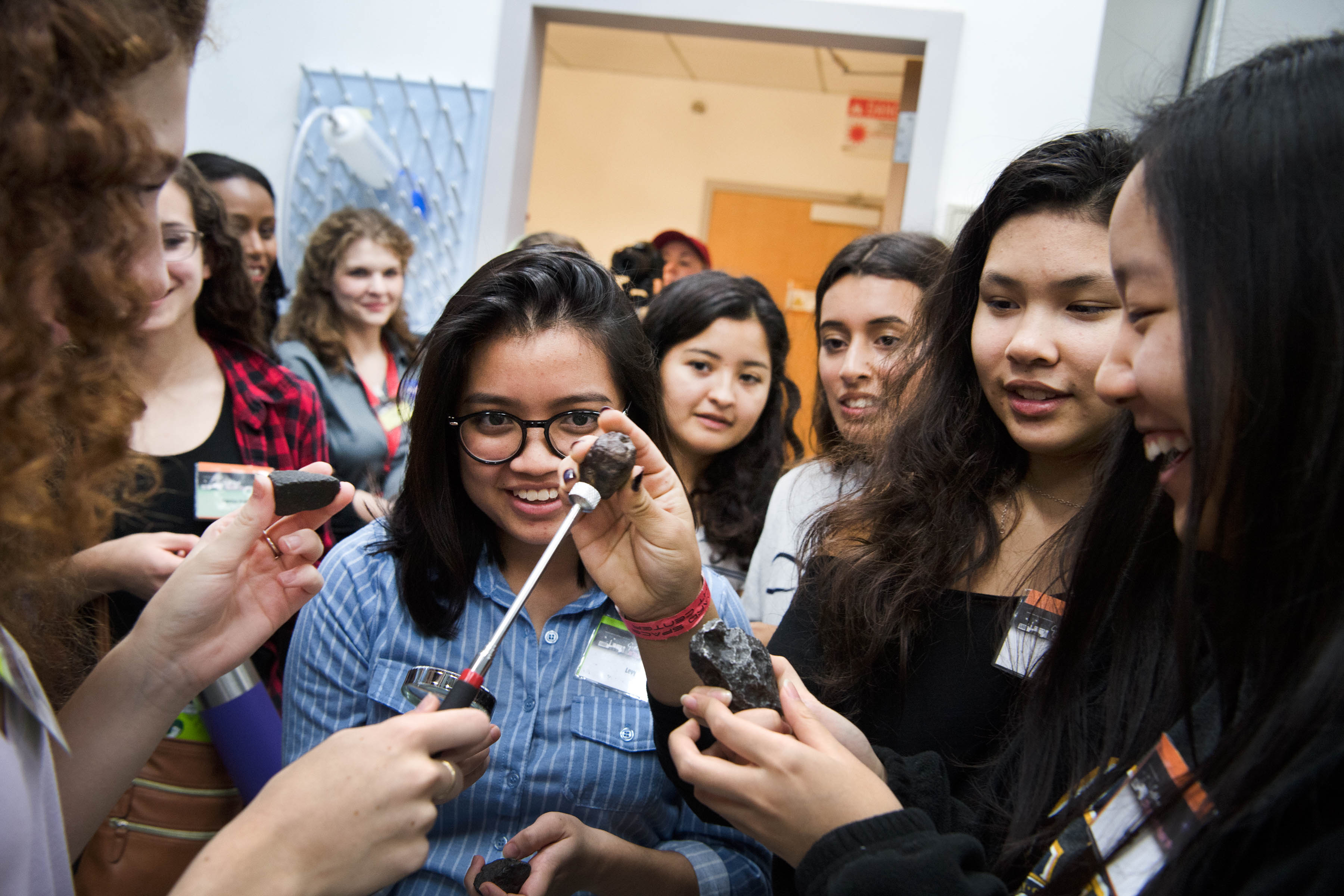
Image of participants of NASA Goddard's STEM Girls Night in 2018

The gender ratio depends on the field of study. For example, in the European Union in 2012 women made up 47.3% of the total, 51% of the social sciences, business, and law, 42% of the science, mathematics, and computing, 28% of engineering, manufacturing, and construction, and 59% of PhD graduates in Health and Welfare.

In a study from 2019, it was shown that part of the success of women in STEM depends on the way women in STEM are viewed. In a study that researched grants given based primarily on a project versus primarily based on the project lead there was almost no difference in the evaluation between projects from men or women when evaluated on the project, but those evaluated mainly on the project leader showed that projects headed by women were given grants four percent less often.

Improving the experiences of women in STEM is a major component of increasing the number of women in STEM. One part of this includes the need for role models and mentors who are women in STEM. Along with this, having good resources for information and networking opportunities can improve women's ability to flourish in STEM fields.

A 2018 study suggested the propensity for women to pursue college degrees in STEM fields declines consistently as countries become more wealthy and egalitarian. However, a 2019 correction to the study outlined that the authors had created a previously undisclosed and unvalidated method to measure "propensity" of women and men to attain a higher degree in STEM, as opposed to the originally claimed measurement of "women's share of STEM degrees." Harvard researchers were unable to recreate the results of the study, thus highlighting problems with the interpretation of the data in the original paper.

== LGBTQ+ ==
People identifying within the group LGBTQ+ have faced discrimination in STEM fields throughout history. Few were openly queer in STEM; however, a couple of well-known people are Alan Turing, the father of computer science, and Sara Josephine Baker, an American physician and public-health leader.

Despite recent changes in attitudes towards LGBTQ+ people, discrimination still permeates throughout STEM fields. A recent study has shown that sexual minority students were less likely to have completed a bachelor's degree in a STEM field, having opted to switch their major. Those that remained in a STEM field were however more likely to participate in undergraduate research programs. According to the study sexual minorities did show higher overall retention rates within STEM related fields as compared to heterosexual women. Another study concluded that queer people are more likely to experience exclusion, harassment, and other negative impacts while in a STEM career while also having fewer opportunities and resources available to them.

Multiple programs and institutions are working towards increasing the inclusion and acceptance of LGBTQ+ people in STEM. In the US, the National Organization of Gay and Lesbian Scientists and Technical Professionals (NOGLSTP) has organized people to address homophobia since the 1980s and now promotes activism and support for queer scientists. Other programs, including 500 Queer Scientists and Pride in STEM, function as visibility campaigns for LGBTQ+ people in STEM worldwide.

== Criticism ==
The focus on increasing participation in STEM fields has attracted criticism. In the 2014 article "The Myth of the Science and Engineering Shortage" in The Atlantic, demographer Michael S. Teitelbaum criticized the efforts of the U.S. government to increase the number of STEM graduates, saying that, among studies on the subject, "No one has been able to find any evidence indicating current widespread labor market shortages or hiring difficulties in science and engineering occupations that require bachelor's degrees or higher", and that "Most studies report that real wages in many—but not all—science and engineering occupations have been flat or slow-growing, and unemployment as high or higher than in many comparably-skilled occupations." Teitelbaum also wrote that the then-current national fixation on increasing STEM participation paralleled previous U.S. government efforts since World War II to increase the number of scientists and engineers, all of which he stated ultimately ended up in "mass layoffs, hiring freezes, and funding cuts"; including one driven by the Space Race of the late 1950s and 1960s, which he wrote led to "a bust of serious magnitude in the 1970s."

According to the U.S. Bureau of Labor Statistics, various STEM occupational outlooks have shown slowing growth or declines for several years.

IEEE Spectrum contributing editor Robert N. Charette echoed these sentiments in the 2013 article "The STEM Crisis Is a Myth", also noting that there was a "mismatch between earning a STEM degree and having a STEM job" in the United States, with only around 1/4 of STEM graduates working in STEM fields, while less than half of workers in STEM fields have a STEM degree.

Economics writer Ben Casselman, in a 2014 study of post-graduation earnings in the United States for FiveThirtyEight, wrote that, based on the data, science should not be grouped with the other three STEM categories, because, while the other three generally result in high-paying jobs, "many sciences, particularly the life sciences, pay below the overall median for recent college graduates."

A 2017 article from the University of Leicester concluded, that "maintaining accounts of a 'crisis' in the supply of STEM workers has usually been in the interests of industry, the education sector and government, as well as the lobby groups that represent them. Concerns about a shortage have meant the allocation of significant additional resources to the sector whose representatives have, in turn, become powerful voices in advocating for further funds and further investment."

A 2022 report from Rutgers University stated: "In the United States, the STEM crisis theme is a perennial policy favorite, appearing every few years as an urgent concern in the nation's competition with whatever other nation is ascendant, or as the cause of whatever problem is ailing the domestic economy. And the solution is always the same: increase the supply of STEM workers through expanding STEM education. Time and again, serious and empirically grounded studies find little evidence of any systemic failures or an inability of market responses to address whatever supply is required to meet workforce needs."

A study of the UK job market, published in 2022, found similar problems, which have been reported for the USA earlier: "It is not clear that having a degree in the sciences, rather than in other subjects, provides any sort of advantage in terms of short- or long-term employability... While only a minority of STEM graduates ever work in highly-skilled STEM jobs, we identified three particular characteristics of the STEM labour market that may present challenges for employers: STEM employment appears to be predicated on early entry to the sector; a large proportion of STEM graduates are likely to never work in the sector; and there may be more movement out of HS STEM positions by older workers than in other sectors... "

== See also ==
- Career and technical education – academic and technical skills for workforce preparation
- Craft Academy for Excellence in Science and Mathematics
- Hard and soft science
- List of African American women in STEM fields
- Maker culture
- NASA RealWorld-InWorld Engineering Design Challenge
- National Society of Black Engineers (NSBE)
- Pre-STEM
- Science, Technology, Engineering and Mathematics Network
- Society of Hispanic Professional Engineers (SHPE)
- STEM Academy
- STEM.org
- STEM pipeline
- Tech ed
