= STEM Academy =

STEM Academy or S.T.E.M. Academy, a school for science, technology, engineering and mathematics, may refer to:

- A-STEM Academy at Pemberton Township High School in Pemberton, New Jersey
- Bluford Drew Jemison STEM Academy West, a Middle/High School at Walbrook High School in Baltimore, Maryland
- Downingtown STEM Academy, a magnet high school in Downingtown, Pennsylvania
- Knox County STEM Academy, a magnet high school in Knoxville, Tennessee
- Phoenix STEM Academy at Dalton L. McMichael High School in Mayodan, North Carolina
- STEM Academy at A. L. Brown High School in Kannapolis, North Carolina
- STEM Academy at Comstock Public School District in Kalamazoo, Michigan
- STEM Academy at Cypress Creek High School (Harris County, Texas)
- STEM Academy at Franklin High School (Elk Grove, California)
- STEM Academy at Great Mills High School in Great Mills, Maryland
- STEM Academy at Legacy of Educational Excellence High School in San Antonio, Texas
- STEM Academy at Ponitz Career Technology Center in Dayton, Ohio
- STEM Academy at University High School (Orange City) in Orange City, Florida
- STEM Magnet Academy at Chicago Public Schools in Chicago, Illinois
- STEMS Academy at Springfield High School (Springfield, Ohio)
- S.T.E.M. Academy at Liverpool High School in Liverpool, New York
- S.T.E.M. Academy at Stony Point High School in Round Rock, Texas
- Tesla STEM High School, a magnet school in Redmond, Washington
- T-STEM Academy at Humble High School in Humble, Texas
